= List of University of Vermont people =

The following is a list of individuals associated with the University of Vermont through attending as a student.

== Notable alumni ==
=== Academia ===
- Henry Vernon Atherton, professor of Animal Science at the University of Vermont; pioneer in the dairy industry
- Guy W. Bailey, secretary of state of Vermont and president of the University of Vermont
- Cynthia Barnhart, Class of 1981, provost of the Massachusetts Institute of Technology since 2022
- Frank M. Bryan, professor of Political Science
- Mary Cushman, Class of 1985, Professor of Medicine and Pathology in the Robert Larner College of Medicine at the University of Vermont
- John Dewey, Class of 1879, pragmatist philosopher and educator
- Berta Geller, Ed.D 1992, and research professor emeritus, University of Vermont College of Medicine

=== Activism ===
- Andrew Harris, abolitionist and minister; first African American to graduate from the University of Vermont
- Jody Williams, Nobel Peace Prize laureate for leading international action to ban land mines

=== Arts ===
- Ben Affleck, actor and Academy Award-winning filmmaker (transferred to Occidental College)
- Trey Anastasio, guitarist in the band Phish (transferred to Goddard College)
- Dierks Bentley, country music artist (attended UVM one year; graduated from Vanderbilt University)
- Mark Boone Junior, aka Mark Heidrich, actor; best known for roles in Sons of Anarchy, Batman Begins, and Memento
- Brian Camelio, Grammy Award-winning producer, pioneer of crowdfunding, founder of ArtistShare
- Jon Fishman, drummer in the band Phish
- David Franzoni, screenwriter of Gladiator, winner of 2001 Academy Award for Best Picture
- Mike Gordon, bassist in the band Phish
- Amr Kashmiri, Pakistani actor and musician
- James Kochalka, Eisner Award-winning cartoonist
- Ella Seaver Owen (1852–1910), artist, teacher
- Theodora Agnes Peck, novelist and poet
- Susan Powers, folk artist
- E. Annie Proulx, Pulitzer Prize-winning author of The Shipping News and Brokeback Mountain
- Barbara Rachko, artist and author
- Jessica Seinfeld, author and cook
- Gail Sheehy, author
- Kerr Smith, actor best known for playing Jack McPhee on the television drama Dawson's Creek
- Michael A. Stackpole, science fiction and fantasy author best known for his Star Wars and BattleTech books
- Jay Stevens, author
- Rupert von Trapp, member of the Trapp Family Singers

=== Business ===
- Frederick H. Billings, lawyer and financier; president of the Northern Pacific Railway 1879–1881
- Daniel Burke, former president of the American Broadcasting Company (ABC)
- Julius Yemans Dewey, physician, founder of the National Life Insurance Company; father of the only admiral of the Navy in U.S. history, George Dewey
- Diane Greene, technology entrepreneur and executive; former co-founder and CEO of VMware, board director of Google, and CEO of Google Cloud
- Brian Halligan, CEO and co-founder of HubSpot and author
- Dr. H. Nelson Jackson; businessman, physician, and senior officer of the Organized Reserves who carried out the first coast-to-coast automobile trip in the U.S.; World War I recipient of the Distinguished Service Cross and a national vice-commander of the American Legion, 1921–1922
- Annelise Loevlie, CEO of Icelantic Skis
- William F. Ruprecht, president and CEO, Sotheby's
- Richard Sands, billionaire businessman and chairperson of Constellation Brands

=== Government and politics ===
- Frederick C. Aldrich, politician, member of New Hampshire House of Representatives
- Consuelo Northrup Bailey, first woman admitted to practice before the U.S. Supreme Court, serve as Speaker of the Vermont House, and be elected a state lieutenant governor (1955–1959); vice chair of the Republican National Committee 1952–1956
- Christopher A. Bray, member of the Vermont House of Representatives and Vermont Senate
- Sarah E. Buxton (2000), member of Vermont House of Representatives, former member of UVM Board of Trustees
- Pedro Albizu Campos (1912–1913), Puerto Rican political leader, orator, lawyer and humanist; was either president or honorary president of the Puerto Rican Nationalist Party from 1930 until his death in 1965
- Matthew Choate 1992, Vermont state senator 2008–2010
- Jacob Collamer, Class of 1810; member of United States House of Representatives and United States Senate; United States Postmaster General; associate justice of the Vermont Supreme Court
- Grace Coolidge, First Lady of the United States 1923–1929
- Jedd Philo Clark Cottrill, Class of 1852, member of Wisconsin State Senate
- Paul Dame, chair of the Vermont Republican party
- Louis F. Dow, mayor of Burlington, Vermont, 1935–1939
- Brian Dubie, Vermont's 85th lieutenant governor, 2003–2011
- Molly Gray, lieutenant governor of Vermont
- Aaron H. Grout, Vermont secretary of state
- Isaac R. Harrington, mayor of Buffalo, New York
- Donly C. Hawley, mayor of Burlington, Vermont
- Hollister Jackson, lieutenant governor of Vermont, died in the Great Flood of 1927
- Madeleine Kunin, former governor of Vermont; former U.S. ambassador to Switzerland; former deputy secretary of education, U.S. Dept. of Education
- James O'Halloran, Canadian politician
- John Eugene Osborne, third governor of Wyoming, U.S. representative from Wyoming
- Hamilton S. Peck, mayor of Burlington, state legislator, city court judge
- H. Henry Powers, U.S. congressman
- Theodore Prentiss, member of Wisconsin State Assembly
- Frederick M. Reed, Vermont attorney general
- Robert Roberts, mayor of Burlington, Vermont
- Phil Scott, governor of Vermont
- John H. Sinclair, commander of the Vermont State Police and U.S. marshal for the District of Vermont
- George R. Vincent, physician and Greenback Party politician in Wisconsin
- Charles W. Waterman, U.S. senator from Colorado, donated funds for construction of UVM's Waterman Building, UVM trustee 1921–1925, presented honorary degree of LL.D. in 1922
- William Almon Wheeler, vice president of the U.S., attended for two years (1837-1839), presented honorary degree of LL.D. in 1867, Bachelor of Arts (as in course) in 1876
- Susanne R. Young, Vermont attorney general since 2022

=== Journalism ===
- Jack Arute, ABC and ESPN sideline reporter
- Clifford Beal, author and international journalist
- Brooke Gladstone, host of On the Media
- Louisa Hodge, television reporter
- Eric Lipton, Pulitzer Prize-winning journalist for The New York Times
- Henry Jarvis Raymond, co-founder of the New York Times and Harper's New Monthly Magazine
- Ryen Russillo, host of The Ryen Russillo Show, former co-host of the ESPN sports talk radio shows SVP & Russillo and Rusillo & Kanell, host of ESPN Radio's College Gameday

=== Law and courts ===
- Asa O. Aldis, associate justice of the Vermont Supreme Court
- John S. Buttles (1897), associate justice of the Vermont Supreme Court
- Harold "Duke" Eaton Jr., justice of the Vermont Supreme Court
- Benjamin F. Fifield, lawyer who served as United States Attorney for the District of Vermont 1869–1880
- Seneca Haselton, mayor of Burlington, U.S. minister to Venezuela, associate justice of the Vermont Supreme Court
- William C. Hill (M.A., 1968), associate justice of the Vermont Supreme Court
- Benjamin N. Hulburd, chief justice of the Vermont Supreme Court
- George M. Powers, chief justice of the Vermont Supreme Court
- John C. Sherburne, Vermont's first Rhodes Scholar and chief justice of the Vermont Supreme Court
- Allen R. Sturtevant, associate justice of the Vermont Supreme Court
- Charles Tetzlaff, United States Attorney for the District of Vermont

=== Medicine ===
- Frederick M. "Skip" Burkle Jr., Robert Larner College of Medicine (1965), humanitarian assistance and disaster response specialist
- Catherine Alicia Georges (2001), nurse, professor, nonprofit executive

=== Military ===
- Brigadier General Donald H. Balch, United States Air Force general
- Brigadier General Jedediah Hyde Baxter, son of Portus Baxter and Surgeon General of the United States Army
- Brigadier General Reginald W. Buzzell (attended, Class of 1918), National Guard officer whose commands included the 43rd Infantry Division
- Lieutenant General Lewis A. Craparotta, United States Marine Corps
- Major General Steven A. Cray, adjutant general of Vermont 2013–2019
- Major General Thomas E. Drew, adjutant general of Vermont, 2012–2013
- Lieutenant General Michael Dubie, former deputy commander of United States Northern Command and former Vermont adjutant general
- Major General Henry U. Harder, adjutant general of Vermont since 2026
- Lieutenant General Edward J. O'Neill, commander of First United States Army
- Brigadier General Wayne H. Page, adjutant general of the Vermont National Guard
- Brigadier General James Stevens Peck, Union Army officer in the American Civil War, later served as adjutant general of the Vermont National Guard
- Brigadier General William Smith, paymaster-general of the United States Army

=== Religion ===
- Fishel Jacobs, martial artist, legal author, speaker
- William True Sleeper, Congregationalist clergyman, educator, poet, and hymn-writer
- Samuel Worcester, missionary to the Cherokees in Georgia and later in Indian Territory during early 19th century

=== Science ===
- Peter F. Barth (M.S. in physics, 1981), neurophysicist, solved generalized closed-Cayley tree Ising model for large neural networks; wrote books on the mind teachings of Tibet
- Duane Graveline, astronaut
- Henry Farnham Perkins, zoologist and eugenicist

=== Sports ===
- Barbara Cochran, Class of 1978, alpine ski racer, won gold medal in slalom at the 1972 Winter Olympics
- Ray Collins, Class of 1909, Boston Red Sox pitcher (1909–15) and later coached for UVM; started the first World Series game at Fenway Park in 1912; indoor track facility named for him and Larry Gardner
- Ross Colton, NHL hockey player for Colorado Avalanche; scored Stanley Cup-clinching goal in 2021
- Larry Gardner, Class of 1909; Major League third baseman for 17 years (1908–24) for the Boston Red Sox, Philadelphia Athletics and Cleveland Indians; played on four World Champions, and later coached and served as the athletic director at UVM; indoor track facility named for him and Ray Collins
- Albert Gutterson, gold medal winner in long jump in 1912 Summer Olympics; hockey facility Gutterson Fieldhouse is named after him
- Billy Kidd, alpine ski racer, 1964 Olympic silver medalist, raced for UVM before joining the U.S. Ski Team
- Jack Lamabe, Major League pitcher for several different teams over seven seasons including the 1967 World Champion St. Louis Cardinals
- Anthony Lamb, basketball player, played for the Golden State Warriors
- John LeClair, member of the 1992–93 Stanley Cup-winning Montreal Canadiens; has three 50 goals seasons in the NHL; former member of the Philadelphia Flyers and Pittsburgh Penguins
- Rollie Massimino, Class of 1956, longtime college basketball coach who led the Villanova University men's basketball team to the 1985 NCAA Championship
- Kirk McCaskill, Major League pitcher for the California Angels and Chicago White Sox
- Torrey Mitchell, NHL center for the Buffalo Sabres
- Éric Perrin, NHL forward for the Tampa Bay Lightning when they won the Stanley Cup in 2004
- Martin St. Louis, three-time NCAA All-American winger; four-time NHL All-Star and NHL Hart Memorial Trophy and Lady Byng Trophy winner; won the Stanley Cup with the Tampa Bay Lightning in the 2003–04 Season
- Zack Scott, general manager of the New York Mets
- Patrick Sharp, NHL hockey player, attended
- Viktor Stålberg, winger for the Nashville Predators, 2009 NCAA All-American, 2013 Stanley Cup champion; attended
- Tim Thomas, goaltender and two-time Vezina Trophy winner for the Boston Bruins; won the Stanley Cup and Conn Smythe Trophy with the Bruins in the 2010–11 season
- Frank Trigilio, American football player

=== Other ===
- H. H. Holmes, serial killer, attended in 1879 and 1880
