= Peter F. Barth =

American Buddhist teacher (born 1956)

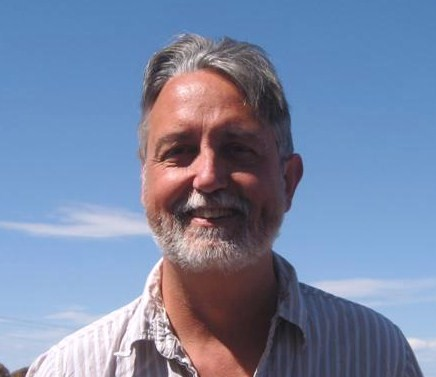
- Barth in Colorado in 2007

Personal life
- Born: 1956 (age 69–70)
- Occupation: engineer, physicist, educator and author

Religious life
- Religion: Tibetan Buddhism
- School: Drukpa Kagyu; Karma Kagyu
- Dharma name: Lama Thapkhay

Senior posting
- Teacher: Thrangu Rinpoche

Peter Felix Barth (also known as Lama Thapkhay) (born 1956) is an American writer specializing in the mind teachings of Tibetan Buddhism. In statistical mechanics, he was responsible for an exact solution to the Ising model for highly-branched, closed-Cayley trees, an area of interest in neurophysics and neural networks.

He has a background in neurophysics, engineering and education, having served as adjunct professor in Information Systems Management (ISM) at the University of San Francisco.

As a Buddhist educator and writer, he has written and published comprehensive guides to the meditation disciplines of Mahamudra and Dzogchen, the pinnacle of the practices of the Kagyu and Nyingma lineages, respectively, including one recommended for seminary and public libraries by the Library Journal.

== Early life and education ==
Peter Felix Barth was born in 1956 in New York, New York, United States.

In 1974 he traveled to India to study meditation under Tibetan Buddhist lamas of the Nyingma and Kagyu schools. While in India he took ordination as a lay Buddhist and completed preliminary Mahamudra studies in Darjeeling. He then returned to the United States to study physics.

In 1976 Barth received his B.S. degree from the Department of Physics, State University of New York in Oneonta, New York; and in 1981 an M.S. degree in Physics from the University of Vermont (UVM) in Burlington. His thesis, Cooperativity and the Transition Behavior of Large Neural Nets, presented a solution to the generalized closed-tree Ising model for Cayley tree topologies and large neural networks.

In 1982 he published the solution to his theoretical model collaboratively with John E. Krizan, his thesis advisor, and M. L. Glasser. Subsequent investigations into the closed-Cayley tree models proposed by Jellito and Barth, eventually yielded a number of additional exact solutions for Ising model topologies with similar underlying symmetries.

== Academic career ==
From 1997 to 2008, Barth served as adjunct professor in Information Systems Management (ISM) at the University of San Francisco.

== Religious career ==
While in India, Barth had studied Mahamudra under a number of Drukpa Kagyu lamas, including Dukchen Thuksey Rinpoche in Darjeeling, who personally played a role in the preservation of Dakpo Tashi Namgyal's text, Moonbeams of Mahamudra, when he requested Lobsang P. Lhalungpa translate it into English and noted that, "This is the most important sacred text!" Barth's first book, Piercing the Autumn Sky: Discovering the Natural Freedom of Mind, was inspired by this work and the oral instructions on it by Thrangu Rinpoche in 1989, as translated "on the fly" by Ken McLeod. From 1989 to 1995, Barth served as a transcriber and editor for the draft publication of a complete three-cycle set of Thrangu Rinpoche's oral instructions under the direction of managing editor Clark Johnson, published in part, in 2001, as Looking Directly at Mind: The Moonlight of Mahamudra and, with further editing, in 2004, as Essentials of Mahamudra.

After rejection of the first draft of his own book by HarperCollins, with the support of his wife, Barth elected to self-publish. Soon after it was released, it was picked up by a major publisher in Rome, Italy, who had it professionally translated into Italian by Giampaolo Fiorentini. The forewords to both of these editions were written by Thrangu Rinpoche and Könchog Gyaltsen Rinpoche, two of Tibetan Buddhism's highest scholar-monks (Tibetan: mkhan chen, literally "great Khenpos") from the Karma Kagyu and Drikung Kagyu lineages, respectively.

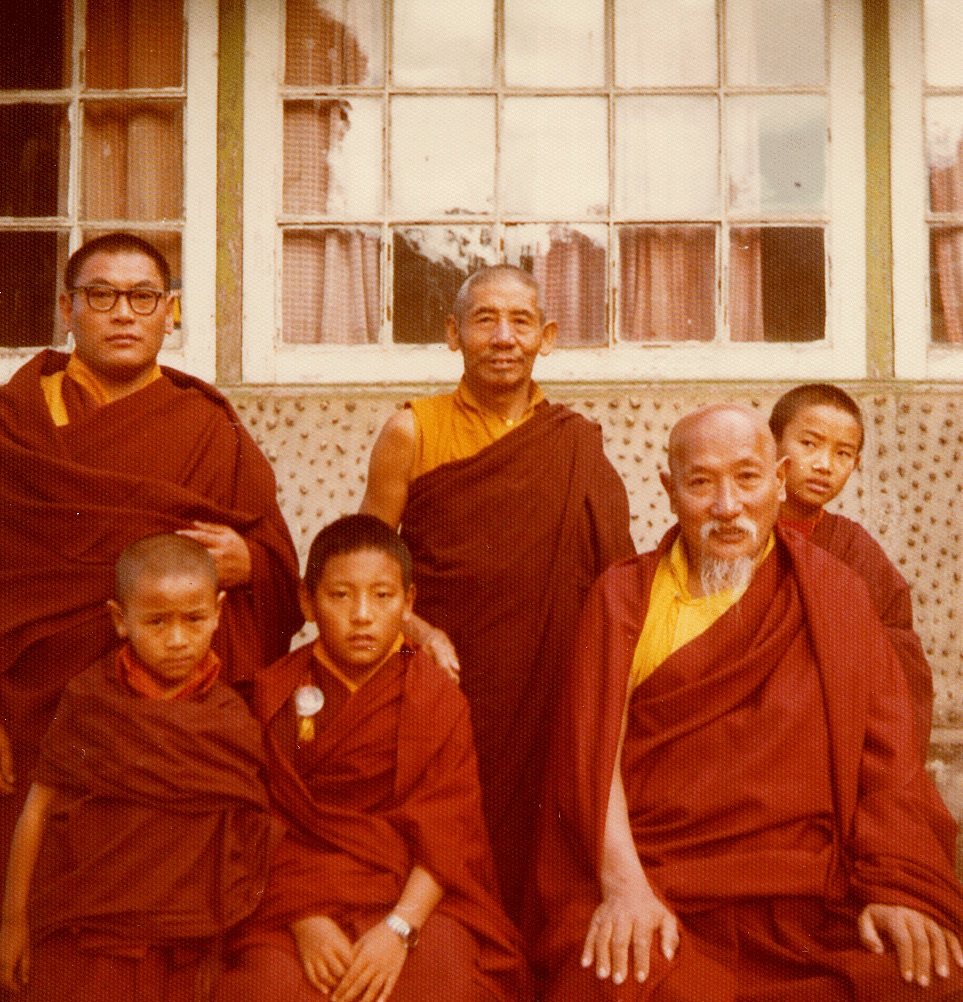
Thuksey Rinpoche, Gyalwang Drukpa Rinpoche, two Khenpos and two Sons of Apho Rinpoche

Upon its publication, the Library Journal called it, "perhaps the most accessible book of the Tibetan tradition." Soon thereafter, Snow Lion Publications showcased it, stating it offers "clear and precise instructions on discovering the natural freedom of mind through mahamudra practice" and, in 2004, it became the only book written by a Westerner to be included on the recommended reading list of Traleg Kyabgon Rinpoche in his first published book on Mahamudra.

Barth subsequently produced two more detailed meditation manuals, A Meditation Guide For Mahamudra and The Meditations of Longchen Rabjam, for the advanced practices of the Kagyu and Nyingma traditions. These were written to serve as detailed guides to the Kagyu classic phyag chen zla ba'i 'od zer (translated as Moonbeams of Mahamudra) written by Dagpo Tashi Namgyal (1512–1587) and the Nyingma classic chos dbyings mdzod (translated as The Precious Treasury of the Basic Space of Phenomena) written by Longchenpa (1308–1364), respectively. In addition, he served as the editor of Mahamudra Teachings by Garchen Rinpoche. Garchen Rinpoche's teachings are a presentation of the mind teachings found and maintained within the Drikung Kagyu lineage.

In 1990, at the encouragement of Thrangu Rinpoche he founded a study and practice group called "Mahamudra Meditation Center", which operated as a nonprofit religious corporation in the State of California, from 1991 to 2011, under his direction and remains dedicated to the instruction and practice of Mahamudra and Dzogchen in order "to cultivate an understanding of mind-as-it-is."

On July 14, 1990, Barth received Zen precepts (Jukai) and lineage papers from Jakusho Kwong Roshi at Sonoma Mountain Zen Center.

Since 1998, he has been listed as "Lama Thapkhay" (at Mahamudra Meditation Center, Petaluma, California) on the official website of the 17th Karmapa, Ogyen Trinley Dorje.

== Retirement ==
Barth retired from his career in engineering and education, and from Mahamudra Meditation Center, in 2015.

== Books ==
- Barth, Peter F.; Rinpoche, Thrangu (foreword); Gyaltsen, Khenpo Könchog (foreword) (1993), Piercing the Autumn Sky: Discovering the Natural Freedom of Mind, Petaluma, CA: Lame Turtle Press, ISBN 0-9635796-3-0
- Barth, Peter F.; Rinpoche, Thrangu (foreword); Gyaltsen, Khenpo Könchog (foreword) (1995), La Naturale Libertà Delle Mente, Roma, Italy: Casa Editrice Astrolabio - Ubaldini Editore, ISBN 88-340-1164-3
- Rinpoche, Garchen (1997), Barth, Peter F. (ed.), Mahamudra Teachings (Drikung Kagyu Teachings Book 1), translated by Rinpoche, Khenchen Könchog Gyaltsen, Drikung Kagyu Teachings, ISBN 0615578314

== See also ==
- Quantum mind
