= JDW =

JDW may refer to:

- Jane's Defence Weekly, a British magazine
- James D. Watson (born 1928), American molecular biologist
- John David Washington (born 1984), American actor and former football running back
- Wetherspoons, a pub chain
