= Buddhism in Ukraine =

Buddhism (Ukrainian: буддизм) is the fourth largest religion in Ukraine. It has existed since the 19th and 20th century, after immigration from countries with Buddhist populations, mainly North Vietnam and Korea under Communist period. Although sources are not readily available, Buddhists are believed to constitute 0.1% of the total population in Ukraine.

== History ==
Despite the fact that on a superficial level Buddhism was known in Ukraine long ago due to the regular contacts of the Ukrainian Cossacks with the Kalmyks, who profess Buddhism, the interest in Buddhism in its philosophical and ethical aspects among the Ukrainian cultural and scientific intelligentsia arose not earlier than in the 19th century. Closer acquaintance with Buddhism was interrupted in the Soviet period, when any interest in religious teachings different from Soviet ideology was persecuted. As a result, such interest could not be fully satisfied and, moreover, grow into certain organizations. Therefore, the first open systematic lectures on Buddhism, sermons and lessons on Buddhist studies, date back to 1989, when the political and ideological pressure of the Soviet system was considerably eased. At that time the first Buddhist teachings took place in Ukraine, and the first secular followers of Buddhism appeared, they took Buddhist refuge in the Three Jewels: Buddha, the Teaching (Dharma) and the Community (Sangha).

Ukraine’s first officially registered Buddhist community was set up in the village of Ol'hynka, Volnovakha Raion, Donetsk Oblast in 1991, and in 1993 Buddhist Center Lunh-zhonh-pa (which means "The Wardens of the Commandments" in the Tibetan language) was built there. This school conducts both lay and monastic activities.

== Russo-Ukrainian war ==
One of the oldest Buddhist communities in Ukraine, originating from Donetsk, is located not far from the village of Kryvopillia in the Carpathians. They were compelled to leave their region and move to the Carpathians after the Donbas war broke out. The monks dream about the war being over and the occupied lands to be returned to Ukraine.

== Contemporary development ==
Today Ukraine has nearly 100 Buddhist communities and groups, 38 of them are officially registered and enjoy the status of legal entity. The largest communities and groups belong to the Tibetan tradition in Buddhism, that is, the tantric tradition of Vajrayana ("Diamond Vehicle"). The most widespread among them are Karma Kagyu communities, the main branch of the Tibetan Kagyu-pa School. They are united into the All-Ukraine Religious Center Ukrainian Association of Karma Kagyu Buddhists. In Ukraine, the religious studies of this center are intended for laypeople. Communities and groups of followers of this tradition are present in almost all regional centers of Ukraine."

There is a Drikung Kagyu center which was officially registered in Kyiv on 2006 in order to fulfill a joint aspiration of H.E. Garchen Rinpoche and his students. The Center is a part of global community of the Garchen Rinpoche’s Centers. During the last ten years, Garchen Rinpoche visited Kyiv four times. Many Drikung Kagyu masters and teachers has visited the Center in the past years. Among them H.E. Garchen Rinpoche, Khenchen Rinpoche, Nubpa Rinpoche, Drupon Tsering Rinpoche, Drupon Yeshe Rinpoche, Drupon Tsering Rinpoche, Lama Dawa Zang, Drupon Yeshe Zangmo, Khenpo Samdrup.

Nyingma school also has followers in Ukraine, in particular Dzongsar Jamyang Khyentse Rinpoche and current Patrul Rinpochе visited Kyiv. Under the guidance of Gyetrul Jigme Rinpoche "Ripa" center was founded.

International Dzogchen Community also have number of its followers and communities in Ukraine. It developed as a separate Buddhist School in the West in the late 20th century through the efforts of Chogyal Namkhai Norbu, the Tibetan Lama in emigration. Like Karma Kagyu, this school is oriented to lay Buddhists in Ukraine.

There is also four Shambala centers, an international organization founded by Chögyam Trungpa

In Kyiv there is Rangjung Yeshe center with followers all over Ukraine, this center conducts regular practices of Chokling Tersar Lineage. Lama Sonam Dorje visited Ukraine many times and give many teachings and practices instructions, and in 2012 Chokyi Nyima Rinpoche visited Kyiv with public talk and empowerment

Several times Dr. Alexander Berzin visited Ukraine to give general Buddhist teachings and their application in modern society.

Besides Tibetan Buddhism schools there are also Zen practitioners, and Vipassana meditation followers As taught by S.N. Goenka
