= Steven A. Cray =

United States Air Force general

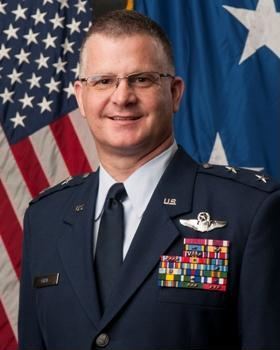
- Major General Steven A. Cray
- Born: June 15, 1964 (age 62); Burlington, Vermont
- Military career
- Allegiance: United States
- Branch: United States Air Force
- Service years: 1984–2019
- Rank: Major general
- Unit: Vermont National Guard
- Commands: Vermont National Guard
- Awards: Air Force Distinguished Service Medal; Legion of Merit; Meritorious Service Medal
- Other work: Commercial Airline Pilot, American Airlines
- Website: http://www.vtguard.com

Major General Steven A. Cray (born June 15, 1964) was the Adjutant General of Vermont. In this post he served as the senior uniformed officer in the state, and was responsible for the organization, training and equipping of the 4,000 members of the Vermont Army and Air National Guard. As adjutant general, he also served as inspector general, quartermaster general and head of the State Military Department, including the Vermont State Guard and Veterans Affairs.

== Early life ==
Steven A. Cray was born in Burlington, Vermont, on June 15, 1964. He graduated from the University of Vermont (UVM) in 1989 with a Bachelor of Science degree in business.

== Military career ==
General Cray enlisted in the Vermont Air National Guard while a student at UVM. He received his commission as a second lieutenant after graduating from the Academy of Military Science in 1984.

He became a pilot and attained the rating of command pilot, logging over 2,500 hours of military flying, mostly in the F-16. He is a qualified Joint Task Force Commander and held a variety of command, supervisory and staff positions in the 158th Fighter Wing and Vermont Joint Force Headquarters. Prior to his appointment as adjutant general he served as assistant adjutant general for air.

== Election as adjutant general ==
In 2012 Michael Dubie left the adjutant general's position to become deputy commander of United States Northern Command. He was succeeded on an interim basis by Thomas E. Drew.

In February, 2013 Cray defeated three other candidates in the Vermont General Assembly election for the position. In Vermont, the adjutant general is elected for a two-year term in secret balloting by a combined meeting of the Vermont House of Representatives and Vermont State Senate. At the time, elections took place in February of each odd-numbered year.

Cray was promoted to major general and took over from Drew in a ceremony on March 1, 2013, and Drew retired.

== Reelection as adjutant general ==
On February 19, 2015, the Vermont General Assembly reelected Cray to a two-year term. He was unopposed, and won by unanimous voice vote. In February 2017, Cray was re-elected to another two-year term, again by unanimous voice vote. He did not run for re-election in 2019. Cray was presented with the Air Force Distinguished Service Medal at his March 2019 retirement ceremony. He was succeeded by Brigadier General Gregory C. Knight.

== Civilian career ==
Before becoming adjutant general, General Cray was employed as a commercial airline pilot with American Airlines, and logged over 10,000 flight hours. He also served as president of the Vermont National Guard Charitable Foundation and on other civic and charitable boards and commissions.

== Education ==
- 1989 University of Vermont, Bachelor of Science, Agriculture, Burlington, Vermont
- 1997 Air Command and Staff College, by correspondence
- 2003 Air War College, by correspondence
- 2007 Advanced Joint Professional Military Education, Joint Forces Staff College, Norfolk, Virginia
- 2007 Dual Status Title 10/32 Joint Task Force Commander's Course, Peterson Air Force Base, Colorado
- 2008 Senior Leaders Orientation Course
- 2010 Joint Force Air Component Commander's Course (JFACC), by correspondence
- 2011 Capstone Military Leadership Program
- 2012 Joint Senior Reserve Officer Course (JSROC)
- 2015 Harvard University, General and Flag Officer Homeland Security Executive Seminar
- 2017 Advanced Senior Leader Development Program-Strategic Engagement Seminar (ASLDP-SES)

== Assignments ==
1. January 1985 – February 1986, student, Undergraduate Pilot Training, Williams Air Force Base, Arizona
2. March 1986 – April 1986, student, AT-38, Fighter Lead-In Training, Holloman Air Force Base, New Mexico
3. April 1986 – November 1986, student, F-16 Replacement Training Unit, MacDill Air Force Base, Florida
4. November 1986 – January 1989, assistant standards and evaluation officer, F-16, 134th Fighter Squadron, Burlington, Vermont
5. January 1989 – July 1992, safety officer/flight lead, F-16, 134th Fighter Squadron, Burlington, Vermont
6. July 1992 – April 1994, instructor pilot, F-16, 134th Fighter Squadron, Burlington, Vermont
7. April 1994 – August 1997, supervisor of flying/flight commander F-16, 134th Fighter Squadron, Burlington, Vermont
8. August 1997 – September 2002, standards and evaluation flight examiner, 134th Fighter Squadron, Burlington, Vermont
9. September 2002 – May 2004, director of operations, Joint Force Headquarters, Vermont Air National Guard, Colchester, Vermont
10. May 2004 – May 2006, director of plans and programs, Joint Force Headquarters, Vermont Air National Guard, Colchester, Vermont
11. May 2006 – April 2009, chief of staff, Joint Force Headquarters, Vermont Air National Guard, Colchester, Vermont
12. April 2009 – March 2013, assistant adjutant general-air, Vermont National Guard, Joint Force Headquarters, Vermont Air National Guard, Colchester, Vermont
13. March 2013 – March 2019, adjutant general, Vermont National Guard, Joint Force Headquarters, Colchester, Vermont

== Flight information ==
General Cray holds the rating of Command Pilot. He has flown more than 2,500 hours. The aircraft he has flown include the F-16A/B/C/D, AT-38, T-38, and T-37.

== Awards and decorations ==
US Air Force Command Pilot Badge

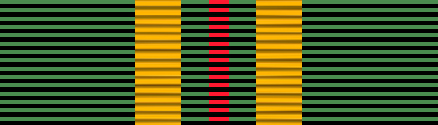
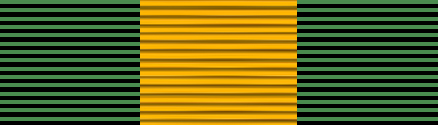
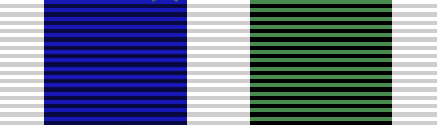
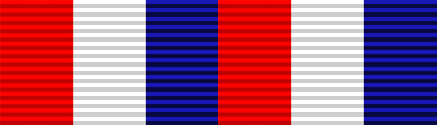
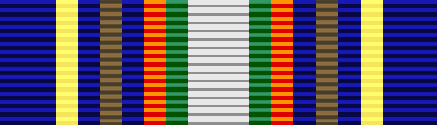
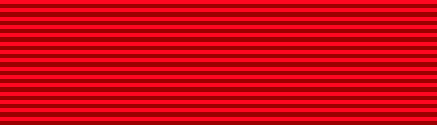
Air Force Distinguished Service Medal
Legion of Merit
Meritorious Service Medal
Aerial Achievement Medal with bronze oak leaf cluster
Air Force Commendation Medal with two bronze oak leaf clusters
Air Force Outstanding Unit Award with three oak leaf clusters and "V" Device
Air Force Organizational Excellence Award
Combat Readiness Medal with 1 Silver Oak Leaf Cluster and 3 Bronze Oak Leaf Clusters
National Defense Service Medal with bronze service star
Armed Forces Expeditionary Medal
Global War on Terrorism Service Medal
Military Outstanding Volunteer Service Medal
Air Force Longevity Service Award with silver and bronze oak leaf cluster
Armed Forces Reserve Medal with silver hourglass and "M" Device
Air Force Training Ribbon
Vermont Medal of Merit
Vermont Commendation Medal
Vermont Meritorious Service Ribbon with oak leaf cluster
Vermont Outstanding Unit Award with oak leaf cluster
Vermont Career Service Award
Vermont Service Ribbon with three oak leaf clusters
Vermont Duty Ribbon with three oak leaf clusters

== Effective dates of promotions ==
Promotions
Insignia	Rank	Date
	Major general	March 1, 2013
	Brigadier general	September 27, 2007
	Colonel	June 4, 2004
	Lieutenant colonel	August 2, 1998
	Major	July 9, 1994
	Captain	August 1, 1989
	First lieutenant	January 10, 1987
	Second lieutenant	December 6, 1984

Military offices
Preceded by Thomas E. Drew	Vermont Adjutant General; 2013–Present	Succeeded by incumbent
