= Jakusho Kwong =

American Buddhist writer

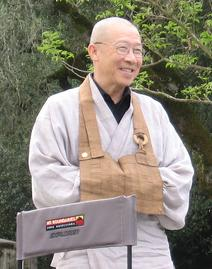
- Title: Zen Master author

Personal life
- Born: William Kwong; November 14, 1935 (age 90) Santa Rosa, California, United States of America

Religious life
- Religion: Buddhism
- School: Sōtō
- Lineage: Shunryu Suzuki

Senior posting
- Based in: Sonoma Mountain Zen Center
- Website: www.smzc.org

Jakusho Kwong (born November 14, 1935), born William Kwong, is a Chinese-American Zen Buddhist teacher in the lineage of Shunryu Suzuki. He serves as head abbot of Sonoma Mountain Zen Center, of which he is founder. He received the title Dendo Kyoshi (or, Zen teacher) from the Soto School of Japan in 1995.

== Early life ==
Jakusho Kwong was born as William Kwong in Santa Rosa, California, on November 14, 1935. In the 1950s, while studying to be an art teacher at San Jose State University, Kwong was in a car accident that nearly killed him. He took a temporary job as a postman to improve the strength in his legs, which had been badly damaged in the accident. He soon married and took a job as a sign painter, leaving school early due to clashes with his art instructor. Kwong and his wife Laura were looking for an alternative lifestyle at this time, when Bill happened upon an article in a Japanese newspaper with a feature story on Shunryu Suzuki.

== Zen practice ==
In 1960, he began studying Soto Zen with Shunryu Suzuki in San Francisco and became one of his first students. In 1971 Suzuki began preparations to give Dharma transmission to Kwong, having given transmission to Richard Baker that previous year, but Suzuki died soon after without carrying it out. After preparatory study with Kobun Chino, Kwong later completed Dharma transmission with Hoitsu Suzuki, Shunryu Suzuki's son and first dharma heir, in keeping with Suzuki-roshi's intention.

In 1973, with Laura (ordination name Shinko) and four sons, Kwong moved to an old farm in Sonoma County, California, with the intention of establishing a meditation center there. The land today encompasses at least eighty-two acres of land, and is known as Sonoma Mountain Zen Center. His son Demian is now a Soto priest active at Genjo-ji.

In the years since, he has traveled to both Poland and Iceland to lead retreats and workshops, giving Dharma talks to affiliate groups.

== See also ==
- Timeline of Zen Buddhism in the United States
