= Sonoma Mountain Zen Center =

Zen center in Santa Rosa, California

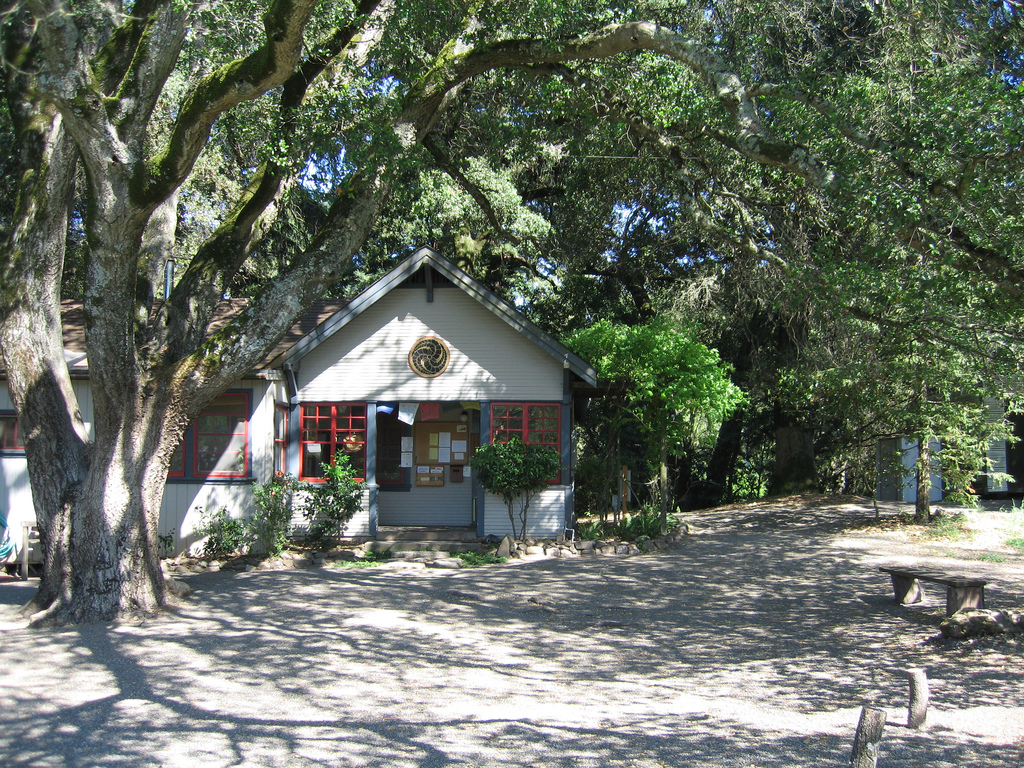

- Location within California

Religion
- Affiliation: Buddhism

Location
- Location: 6367 Sonoma Mountain Road, Santa Rosa, CA 95404
- Country: United States
- Interactive map of Sonoma Mountain Zen Center
- Coordinates: 38°22′1″N 122°34′42″W

Architecture
- Founder: Jakusho Kwong; Laura Kwong
- Completed: 1973

Website
- www.smzc.org

Sonoma Mountain Zen Center (or, Genjoji) is a Soto Zen practice center located on 80 acres (30 ha) in the mountainous region of Sonoma County in California—near Santa Rosa—carrying on the tradition and lineage of Shunryu Suzuki. Founded by Jakusho Kwong and his wife Laura Kwong in 1973, Kwong-roshi is the current guiding teacher of the Zen center. Offering residential training, Saturday Community and group retreats. Sonoma Mountain Zen Center also offers a practice regimen for members of the surrounding area and elsewhere who are not residents.

== About ==
Sonoma Mountain Zen Center was established by Jakusho Kwong and his wife Laura Kwong in 1973. According to the book Opening the Mountain, "Bill and Laura Kwong had moved to Mill Valley and began a little 'put away zendo.' It took place in a neighborhood hall. Every morning, mats, cushions, and altar were put away so other uses of the room could happen. In 1973 the Kwongs and their four sons moved one county north. Classes Bill taught at Sonoma State University gave birth to Sonoma Mountain Zen Center." A self-sustaining institution, the Zen center supports itself through members donations, proceeds from its Zen Dust bookstore, and by offering rooms for rental. Author Sarah Ban Breathnach described the center in her book A Man's Journey to Simple Abundance:

"Near the top of the mountain, the road dips, bends, then snakes through a small grove of redwoods. The dense tree canopy blocks all ambient light, so that when you emerge on the other side of the grove, you feel as though you've passed through a portal into another world. It's a fitting way to approach Sonoma Mountain Zen Center, because people there view reality just a little bit differently from the way most of us do."

== Gallery ==
On September 16, 2012, a groundbreaking ceremony took place at Sonoma Mountain Zen Center:

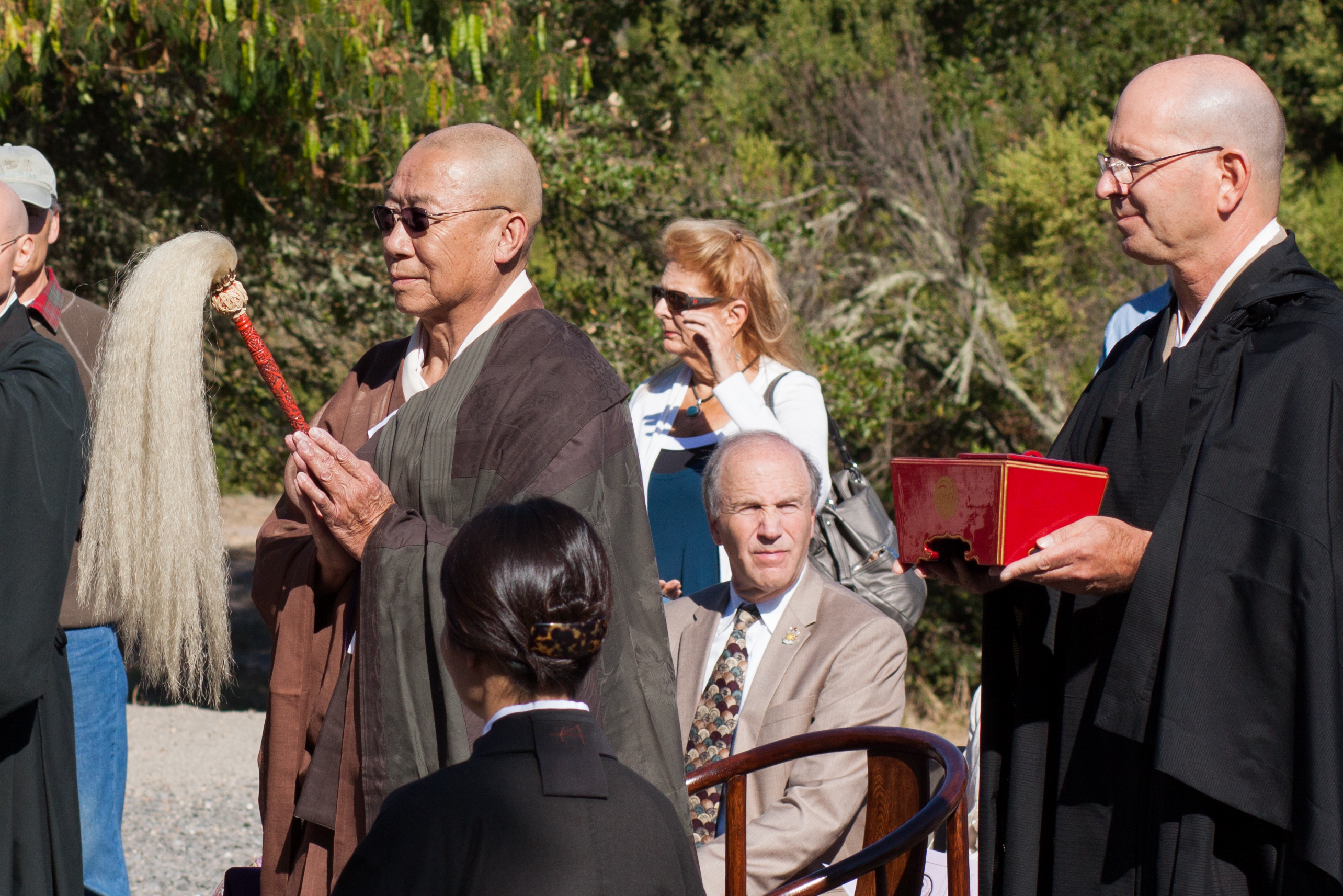
Entrance of the abbott

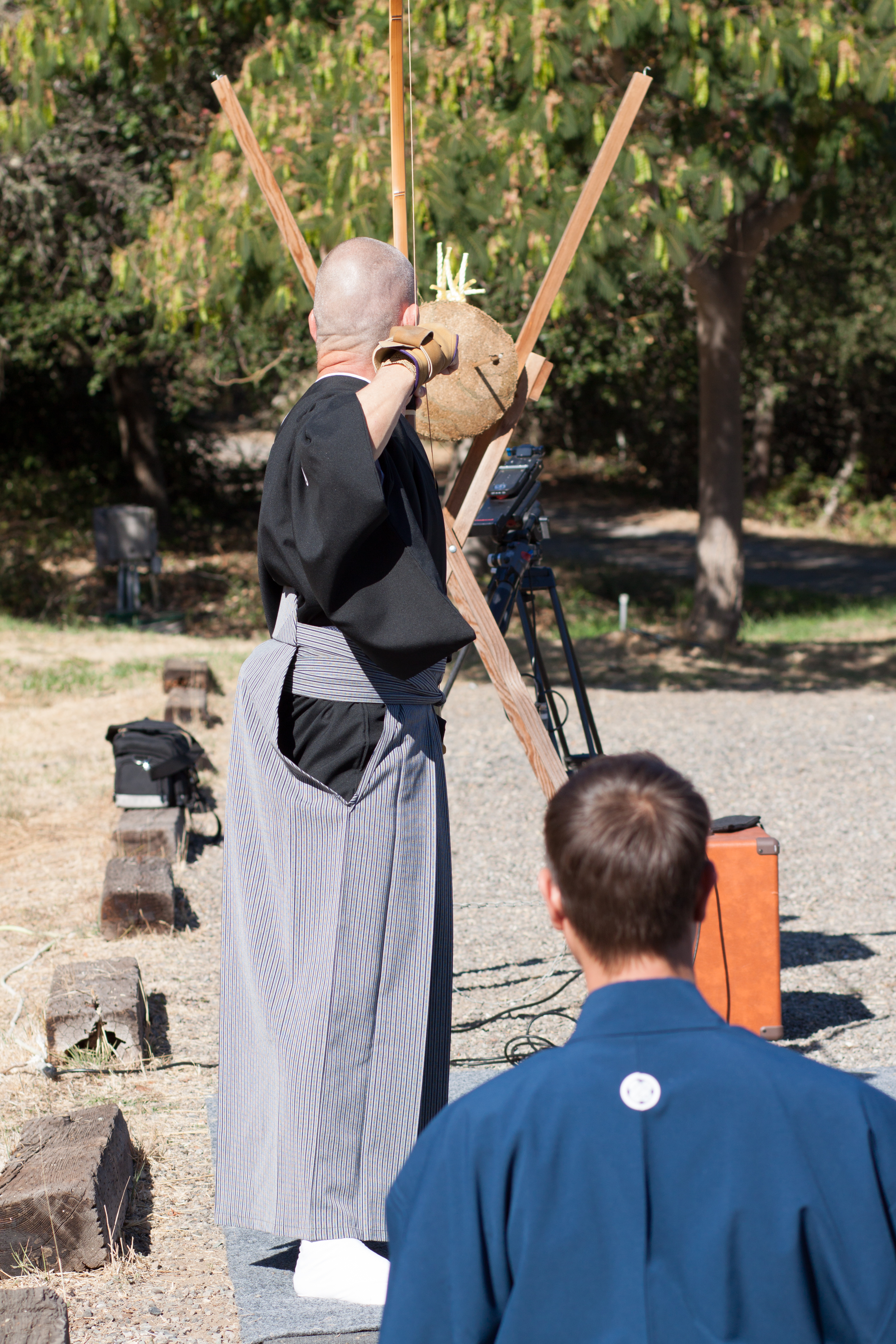
Kyūdō as part of the ceremony

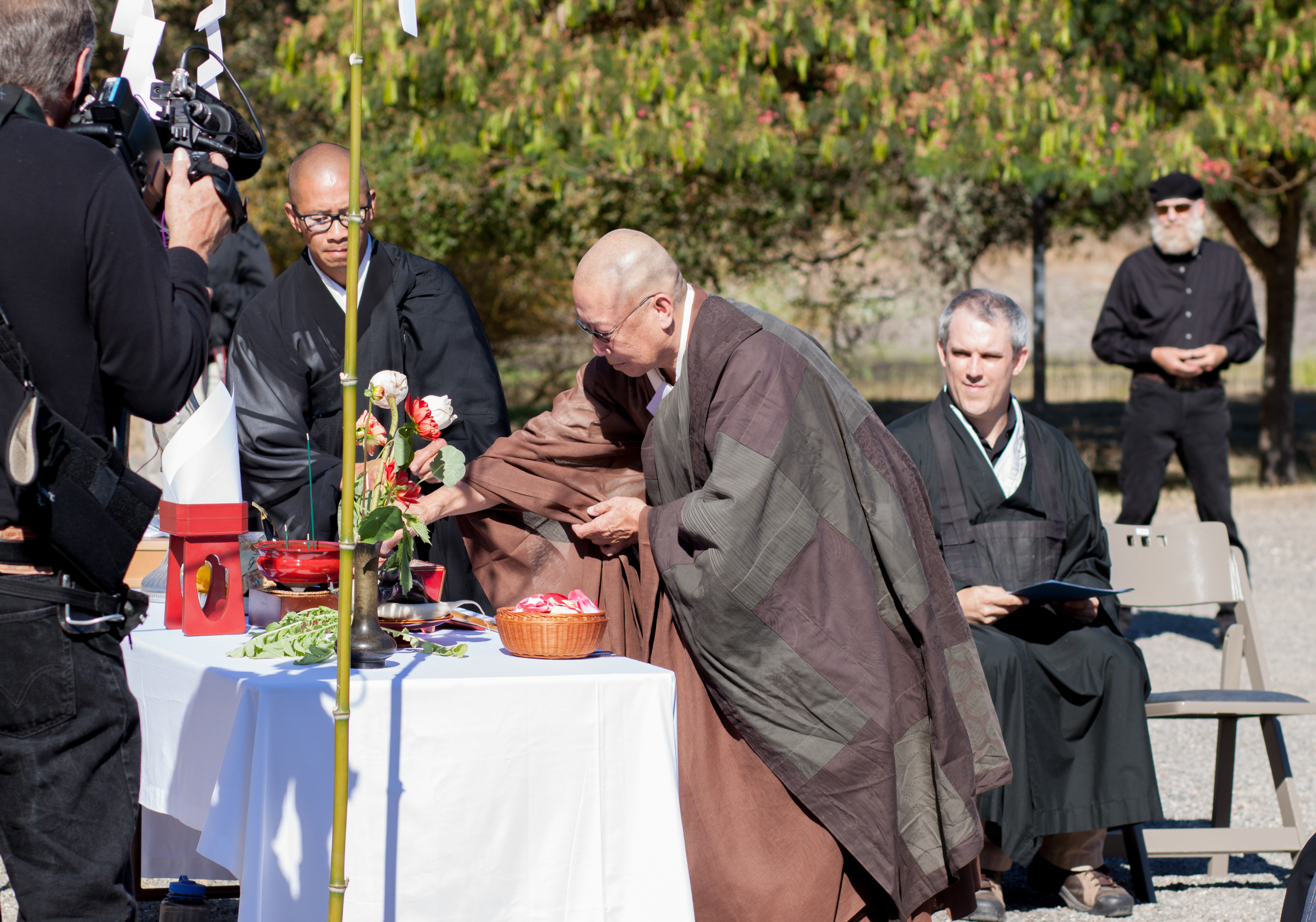
The abbott during the ceremony

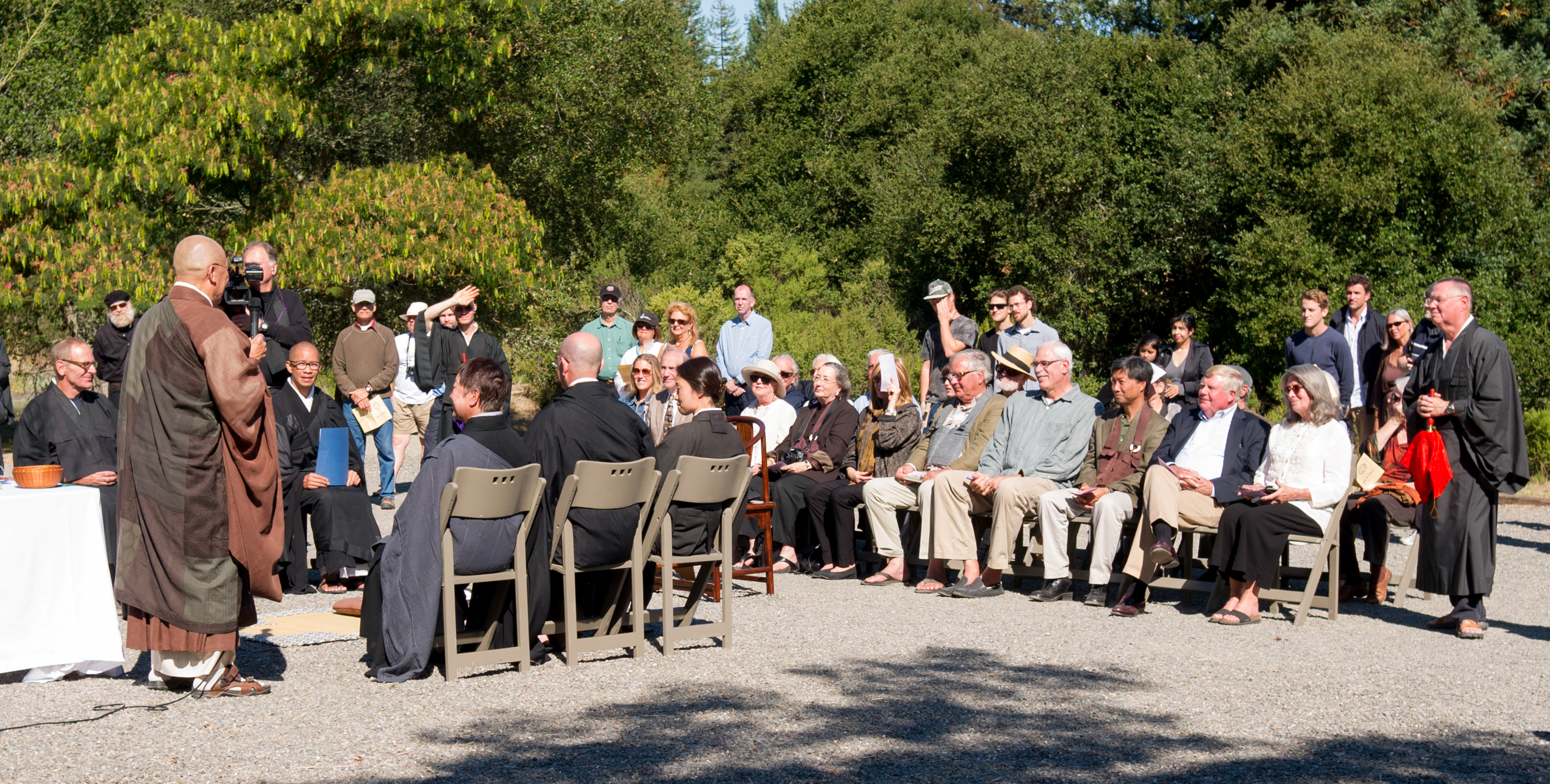
Speech at the end of the ceremony

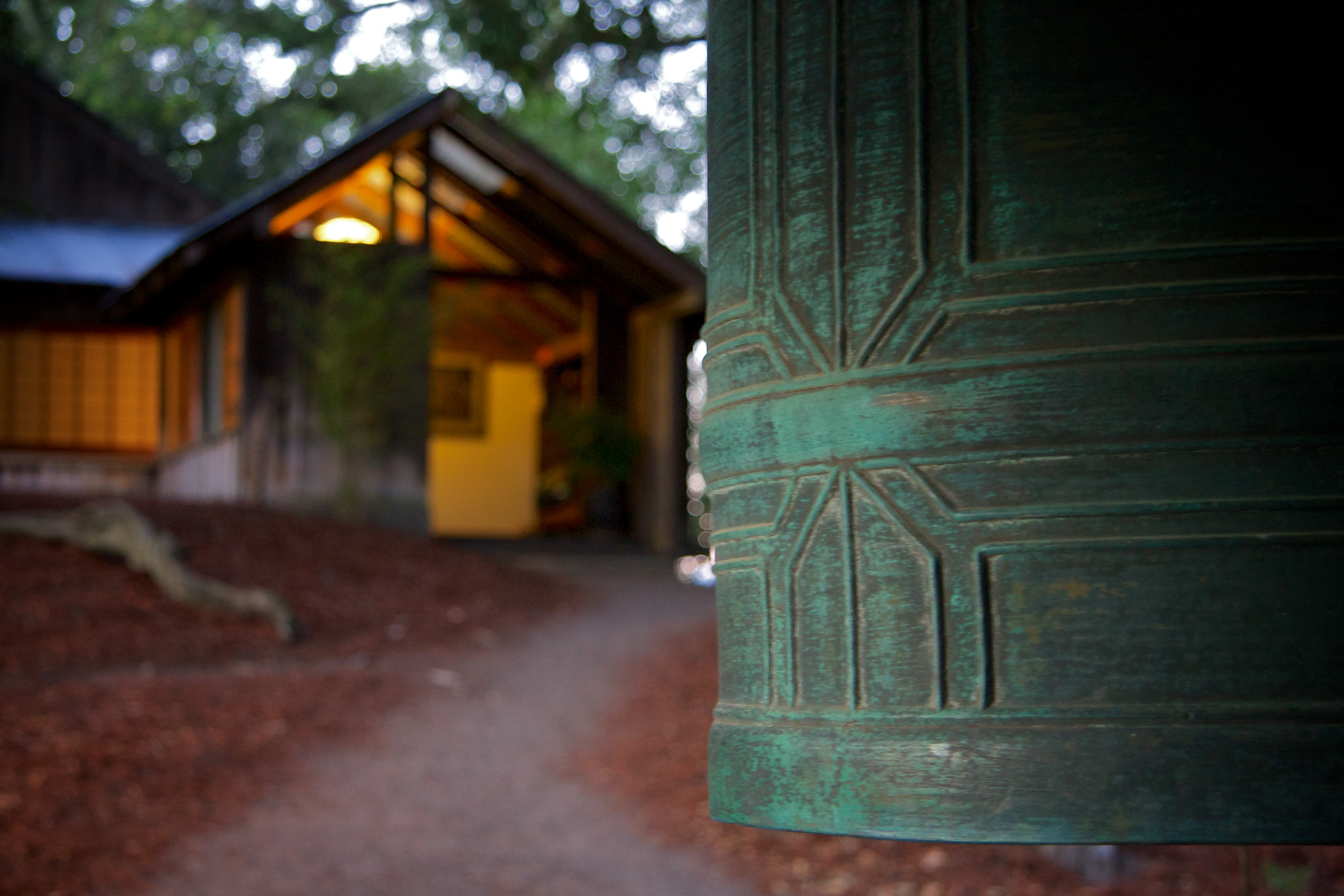
Original Zendo- Sonoma Mountain Zen Center

== See also ==
- Buddhism in the United States
- Sonoma Mountain
- Timeline of Zen Buddhism in the United States
