= Thomas E. Drew =

United States Army general (born 1950)

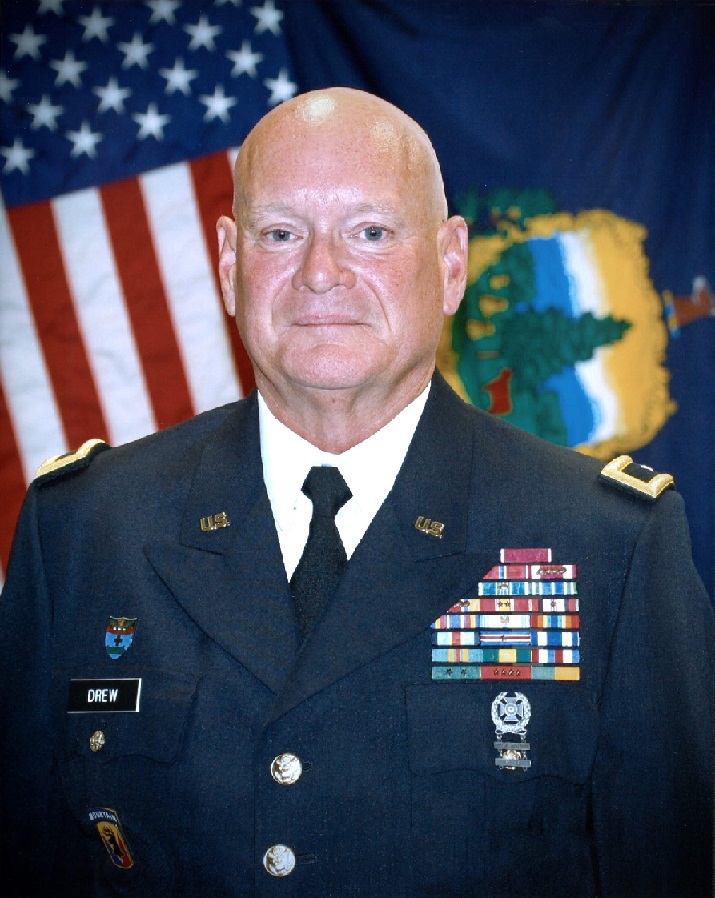
- Major General Thomas E. Drew
- Born: August 8, 1950 (age 76); Proctor, Vermont
- Military career
- Allegiance: United States
- Branch: United States Army
- Service years: 1973–2001; 2006–2013
- Rank: Major General (Vermont)
- Unit: Vermont National Guard
- Commands: Company A, 2nd Battalion, 172nd Armor (1983 to 1985); 1st Battalion, 172nd Armor (1992 to 1995); 86th Armored Brigade (1997 to 2000); Vermont National Guard (August, 2012 to March, 2013)
- Conflicts: Operation Enduring Freedom
- Awards: Legion of Merit; Bronze Star Medal; Meritorious Service Medal (5); Army Commendation Medal (2); Army Achievement Medal
- Other work: Executive Director, Old Homestead Community Center; Executive Director, Addison County branch, Retired Senior Volunteer Program (RSVP)
- Website: http://www.vtguard.com

Major General (Vermont) Thomas E. Drew (born August 8, 1950) was the adjutant general of the State of Vermont. In this post he served as the senior uniformed military officer in the state, and was responsible for the organization, training and equipping of the 4,000 members of the Vermont Army and Air National Guard. As adjutant general, he also served as inspector general, quartermaster general and head of the State Military Department, including veterans affairs.

== Biography ==
Thomas Edwin Drew was born in Proctor, Vermont, on August 8, 1950. He was raised in Florence, attended school in Florence, Pittsford and Brandon and graduated from the University of Vermont in 1972.

== Military career ==
Drew received his commission as a second lieutenant in the United States Army through UVM's Reserve Officers' Training Corps. After serving on active duty with the 9th Infantry Division until 1977, he joined the Vermont National Guard and became a member of the Active Guard and Reserve Program. He retired as a colonel in 2001. Drew's service included command of: Company A, 2nd Battalion, 172nd Armor (1983 to 1985); 1st Battalion, 172nd Armor (1992 to 1995); and the 86th Armored Brigade (1997 to 2000).

== Civilian career ==
Upon retirement, Drew served as executive director of Old Homestead Community Center, a Castleton, Vermont nonprofit that provides essential services to seniors and children. After four years in this role, he became executive director of the Addison County branch of the Retired Senior Volunteer Program (RSVP).

== Subsequent military career ==
In 2006, Drew returned to military service as deputy adjutant general with a state commission as a brigadier general. Drew served as deputy adjutant general until 2009, when he was voluntarily recalled to active duty as a colonel. He deployed to Afghanistan for Operation Enduring Freedom as deputy commander of the 86th Infantry Brigade Combat Team (Mountain). During the deployment Drew reached age 60, the mandatory age for retirement from the military, but remained in Afghanistan and continued to serve. Upon redeploying from Afghanistan Drew returned to the military's Retired Reserve and resumed his state duties as deputy adjutant general.

In 2012 Michael Dubie was appointed as deputy commander of United States Northern Command. Upon Dubie's August 3, 2012, resignation as Vermont's adjutant general to assume his new duties, Drew succeeded him as adjutant general. Drew was subsequently promoted to major general (Vermont), and served out the remainder of Dubie's term.

Drew was not a candidate for a full term in 2013. On February 21, 2013, the Vermont General Assembly elected Steven A. Cray as Drew's successor. (In Vermont, the adjutant general is elected for a two-year term in secret balloting by a combined meeting of the Vermont House of Representatives and Vermont State Senate. At the time, elections took place in February of each odd-numbered year.) Cray took over from Drew in a ceremony on March 1, 2013, and Drew retired.

== Education ==
- University of Vermont, Bachelor of Science in History, 1972, Burlington, Vermont
- U.S. Army Intelligence Center and School, Intelligence Officer Basic Course, 1973, Fort Huachuca, Arizona
- United States Army Armor School, Armor Officer Advanced Course, 1984, Fort Knox, Kentucky
- United States Army Command and General Staff College, Command and General Staff Officer Course, 1988, Fort Leavenworth, Kansas

== Awards and decorations ==
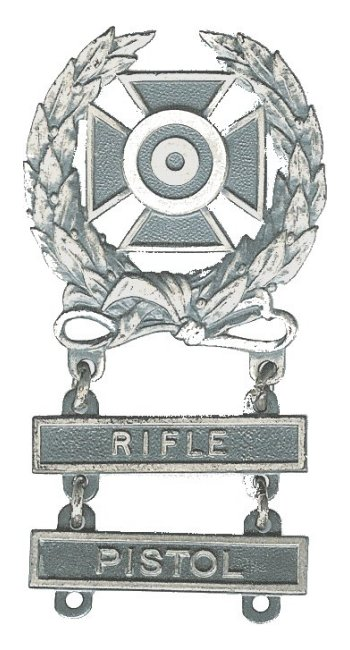
Expert Marksmanship Badge with Rifle and Pistol bars
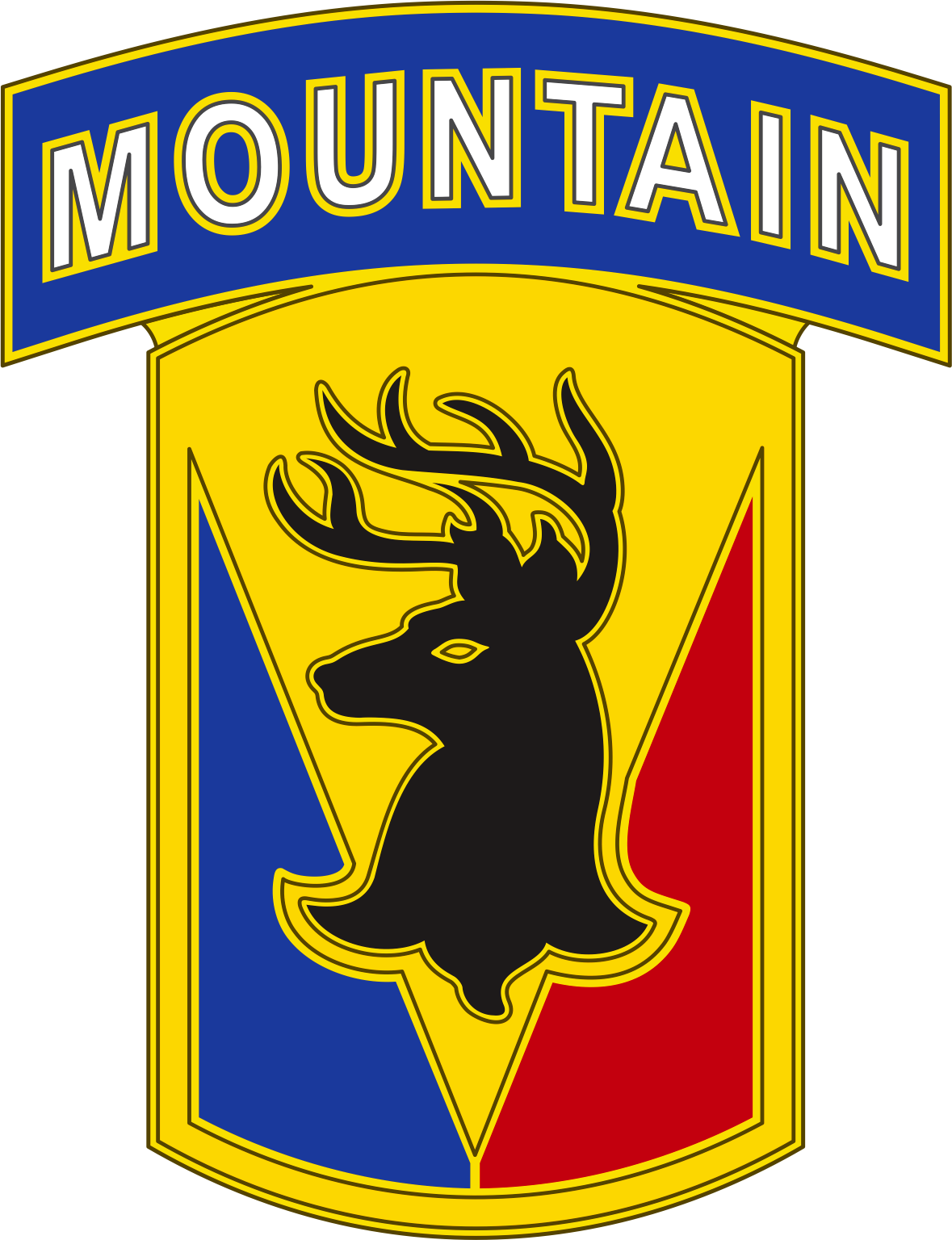
86th Infantry Brigade Combat Team Combat Service Identification Badge
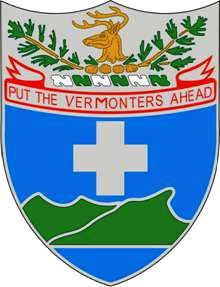
172nd Cavalry Regiment Distinctive Unit Insignia

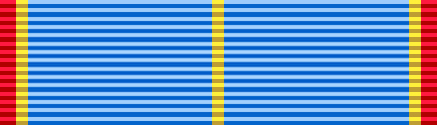
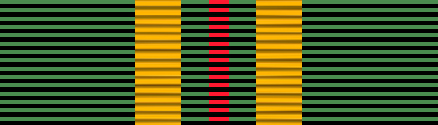
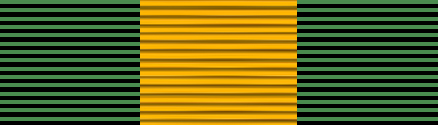
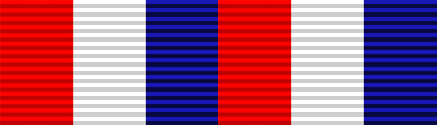
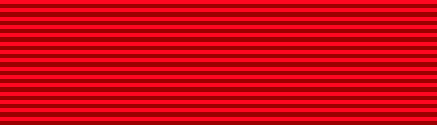
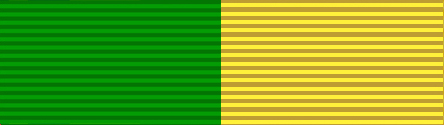
Legion of Merit
Bronze Star Medal
Meritorious Service Medal (5)
Army Commendation Medal (2)
Army Achievement Medal
Army Reserve Component Achievement Medal (5)
National Defense Service Medal (3)
Afghanistan Campaign Medal with one campaign star
Global War on Terrorism Service Medal
Armed Forces Reserve Medal with M device for Mobilization
Army Service Ribbon
Army Overseas Service Ribbon
Army Reserve Component Overseas Training Ribbon (2)
NATO Medal
Vermont Distinguished Service Medal
Vermont Medal of Merit
Vermont Commendation Medal
Vermont Outstanding Unit Award
Vermont Service Ribbon (3)
Vermont Duty Ribbon (5)
Vermont State Special Duty Ribbon

== Effective Dates of Promotions ==
Promotions
Insignia	Rank	Date
	Major General (Vermont)	August 13, 2012
	Brigadier General (Vermont)	April 2, 2006
	Colonel	September 14, 1998
	Lieutenant Colonel	August 18, 1992
	Major	October 23, 1985
	Captain	May 28, 1977
	First Lieutenant	May 28, 1975
	Second Lieutenant	January 26, 1973

== Other achievements ==
- Order of St. George Bronze Medallion, U.S. Cavalry & Armor Association, 1995
- Order of St. George Silver Medallion, 2000

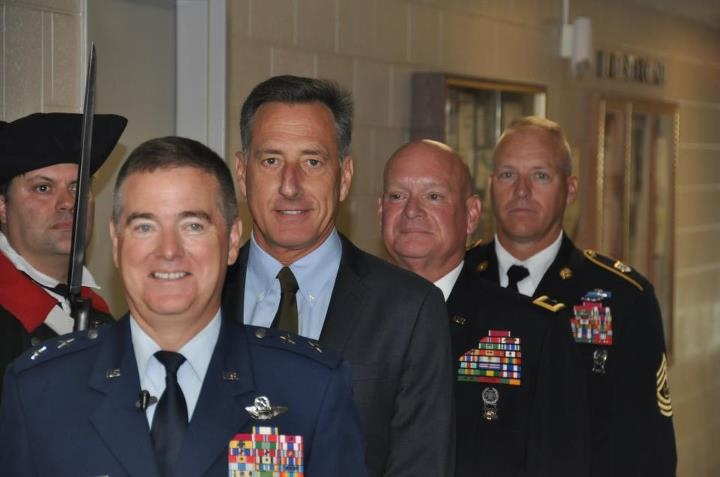
Michael Dubie, Peter Shumlin, Drew, Command Sergeant Major Forest Glodgett prepare for Transfer of Authority where Drew succeeded Dubie as Adjutant General. Photo by James Greene, Vermont National Guard.

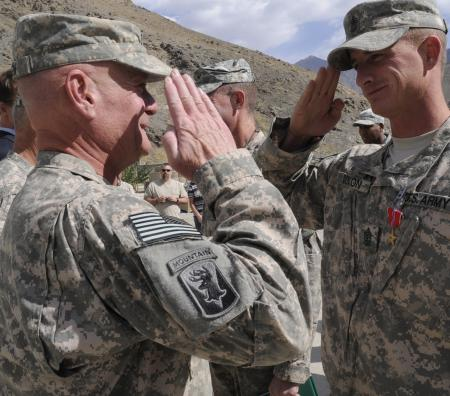
Drew salutes Scott Doyon of Clinton, Maine after presenting Bronze Star Medal, Oct. 21, 2010.

Military offices
Preceded by Michael Dubie	Vermont Adjutant General; 2012–2013	Succeeded by Steven A. Cray
