= Clifford Beal =

American author

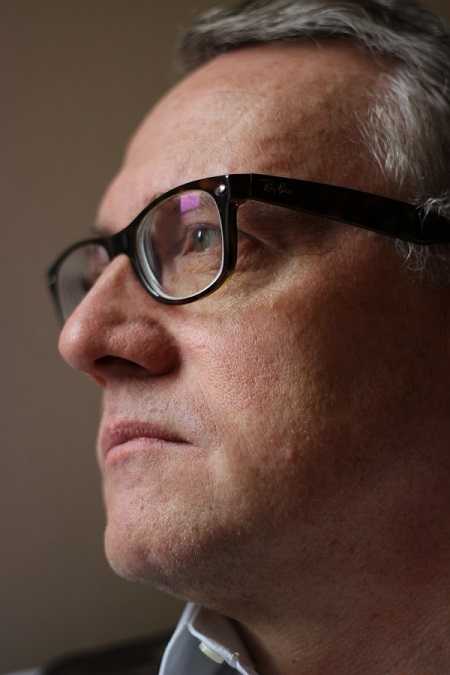
- Born: Rhode Island, United States
- Education: University of Vermont; University of Sussex
- Occupations: Writer; editor; journalist
- Website: cliffordbeal.com

Clifford Beal is an author in the history, historical fiction, suspense, and fantasy genres. Prior to his career as a writer, he served as an international journalist and held the position of Editor at Jane’s Defence Weekly in London. Beal has authored eight books, along with numerous short stories and articles featured in various news publications.

== Biography ==
Born in Rhode Island, Beal completed his undergraduate studies in History at the University of Vermont. He later pursued a Master's degree in International Relations from the University of Sussex. At the outset of his career, Beal was engaged in public policy at the American Institute of Aeronautics & Astronautics. He later transitioned into journalism, focusing on defence and security matters. Beal became associated with the military publisher Jane’s in 1991, eventually assuming the role of Editor of Jane’s Defence Weekly in 1998. In recognition of his contributions, he was honoured as an Editor of the Year by the British Society of Magazine Editors in 2000.

Over a span of ten years, Beal made numerous television and radio appearances.

At the conclusion of 2003, Beal transitioned from journalism to freelance consulting and writing. In 2015, he was honoured with election as a Fellow of the Royal Aeronautical Society.

In April 2024, Beal was named an Honorary Senior Research Fellow at Exeter University’s Centre for Public Understanding of Defence and Security.

Published in 2007, Beal's debut book Quelch’s Gold chronicles the life of John Quelch. A privateer who faced trial for piracy in 1704 in Boston, Quelch was the first individual to undergo a criminal trial under the Court of Admiralty outside of London. The trial, marked by its historical significance, underscored a significant miscarriage of colonial justice and carried enduring repercussions. His other works include high-fantasy novel The Guns of Ivrea, and most recently, Hawker and the Lost Prince. Published in 2023 by Canelo, it is the second entry in a series set in the 15th century.

He writes under his own name and as Ethan Bale.

== Bibliography ==
Year of Publication	Novel	Publisher	Additional Notes
2007	Quelch's Gold	Praeger	Non-fiction
"Sir Richard Treadwell" Series			
2013	Gideon's Angel	Solaris Books	
2014	The Raven's Banquet	Solaris Books	
"Valdur" Series			
2016	The Guns of Ivrea	Solaris Books	
2017	The Witch of Torinia	Solaris	
"The Swords of the White Rose" Series			Writing as Ethan Bale
2022	Hawker and the King's Jewel	Canelo	
2023	Hawker and the Lost Prince	Canelo	
2024	The Knight's Redemption	Canelo	
Short Stories
2017	War is Grimm	Weirdbook #37	
2022	Shooting the Breeze	Mystery Tribune Magazine	
