= Barbara Rachko =

American artist and author

- Education: University of Vermont
- Occupations: Visual artist, blogger, author
- Website: Barbara Rachko

Barbara Rachko is an American artist and author best known for her Mexico-inspired large artistic works that utilize soft pastel-on-sandpaper.

== Career ==
In 1986, while working at the Pentagon, she began to study figure drawing and medical anatomy and began developing her craft. Rachko subsequently resigned from active duty (but remained in the Navy Reserve and retired as a Naval Commander in 2003) to devote herself to making art.

Rachko is drawn to Bolivian, Mexican, and Guatemalan cultural objects like masks, carved wooden animals, papier-mâché figures, and toys for reasons similar to those of Man Ray and the modernists, who in their case were drawn to African art. On trips to South America, Central America and Mexico, she frequents local mask shops, markets, and bazaars searching for the figures that will later populate her pastel paintings and photographs. She takes very old text omitted objects with a unique Mexican or Guatemalan past (most have been used in religious festivals) and gives them a second life.

== Works ==
Her pastel-on-sandpaper series, "Domestic Threats" and "Black Paintings", both use cultural objects as surrogates for human beings acting in mysterious, highly charged narratives.

Rachko also has created a series of photographs entitled "Gods and Monsters". In these chromogenic prints, she is "painting with a camera," creating variations that free the camera from being a mechanical recording device of what lies before it. She prints all of these images by hand.

The earlier "Domestic Threats" pastel-on-sandpaper paintings used her West Village apartment or her 1932 Sears house in Virginia as a backdrop. The "Black Paintings" series grew directly from "Domestic Threats". In the "Black Paintings," the figures (actors) take center stage. All background details, furniture, rugs, etc. have been eliminated and replaced by intense dark black pastel. Each painting takes months to complete as she slowly builds up as many as 30 layers of soft pastel.

Her long-standing fascination with traditional masks progressed in the spring of 2017 when she visited the National Museum of Ethnography and Folklore in La Paz, Bolivia where one exhibition included more than fifty festival masks. The resulting series is entitled “Bolivianos”.

She has also written an e-book, From Pilot to Painter and writes a regular blog, Barbara Rachko's Colored Dust. Rachko has been featured in media including blogs, radio, magazines, and was a featured artist on La Maison du Pastel.

Recent exhibitions include Westbeth Gallery and Salomon Arts Gallery in New York, Art Basel Miami, the 2017 Miami River Art Fair, Emillions in Naples, FL; Art Below Regent’s Park, Le Dame Gallery, ARTROOMS (created by Cristina Cellini Antonini, founder of Le Dame Art Gallery), and The Old London Brewery, all in London, England.

== Reception ==
On Rachko's work, New York critic Peter Dellolio remarks, “It is undeniable that, like de Chirico, Barbara Rachko has created a unique, original, and very private landscape.”

Dr. Lisa Paul Streifeld states, “If Andre Serrano were a painter, he would do a Barbara Rachko. Indeed, the advent of an erotic consciousness that Serrano initiated in the hyperrealist medium of photography now extends to canvas; Barbara Rachko newly interprets painting as the subject/object ‘capturing site’ of the 360-degree perspective of the hieros gamos.”

== Background ==
Rachko was born in Paterson, New Jersey and grew up in Clifton, a New York City suburb. She graduated from the University of Vermont with a degree in psychology. At the age of 25, Rachko learned to fly and became a private pilot while earning an instrument rating, commercial pilot's license, multi-engine rating, and flight Boeing 727 engineer's certificate over the next two years. She studied art at Art League School in Alexandria, Virginia and International Center of Photography in New York. As a Naval officer she spent many years working at the Pentagon and retired as a Commander.

On 9/11 her life was drastically affected when her husband, Dr. Bryan C. Jack, was killed on the plane that hit the Pentagon.
