= Jane's Defence Weekly =

British weekly magazine focussing on military matters

- Cover for 20 May 2020 edition.
- Editor: Peter Felstead
- Features Editor: Kate Tringham
- Europe Editor: Nicholas Fiorenza
- Asia Pacific Editor: Gabriel Dominguez
- Middle East/Africa Editor: Jeremy Binnie
- Americas Editor: Daniel Wasserbly
- Staff writers: Geoff Fein; Marina Malenic; Jon Grevatt
- Categories: Defence
- Frequency: Weekly
- Paid circulation: 2,717
- Unpaid circulation: 24,886
- Total circulation: 27,603 (June 2012)
- Founded: 1984
- Company: Janes Information Services
- Country: England
- Based in: Coulsdon, Surrey
- Language: English
- Website: www.janes.com/defence-news/
- ISSN: 0265-3818
- OCLC: 613908494

Jane's Defence Weekly (abbreviated as JDW) is a weekly magazine reporting on military and corporate affairs, edited by Peter Felstead. It is one of a number of military-related publications named after John F. T. Jane, an Englishman who first published Jane's All the World's Fighting Ships in 1898. It is a unit of Janes Information Services. The magazine is frequently cited in publications worldwide.

== History ==
Jane's Defence Weekly was established in 1984 replacing the now-defunct Jane's Defence Review. The latter was started in 1978 and was published on a monthly basis. Award winning international journalist Clifford Beal is a former editor of the magazine.

=== Samuel Loring Morison ===
In 1984, only months after the magazine was established, Jane's Defence Weekly gained worldwide attention after printing several images from an American spy satellite of the Nikolaiev 444 shipyard in the Black Sea, showing a Kiev-class aircraft carrier under construction. The images were leaked by Samuel Loring Morison, an American intelligence professional, leading to the only conviction ever passed against a US government official for giving classified information to the press.
