= Berta Geller =

American professor of family medicine

Berta M. Geller is an American research professor emeritus in the department of family medicine at the University of Vermont College of Medicine. She was a long time faculty member in its health promotion office.

== Life ==
Geller completed a Ed.D. at the University of Vermont. Her 1992 dissertation was titled Eighth grade students' smoking behavior in relationship to their teachers', favorite teachers' and principals' smoking behavior.

In February 1992, Geller, a faculty member in the University of Vermont's health promotion office, was a speaker in a breast cancer forum hosted by the Burlington Board of Health and the Burlington Women's Council. In 2000, Geller was a faculty member of the University of Vermont College of Medicine (UVCM). She worked as a research associate and professor in breast cancer studies. In 2007, Geller was the principal investigator on a $213,500 scholar grant from the American Cancer Society. The grant is to improve skills for radiologists reading mammograms. By October 2008, Geller was a research professor of family medicine in the office of health promotion research at the UVCM and University of Vermont Cancer Center. She was named the 2008 J. Walter Juckett Scholar for her project aimed at providing social support to cancer survivors.

In 2021, Geller was the West Tisbury, Massachusetts Complete Streets committee chair.
