= Michael Dubie =

United States Air Force general

Michael D. Dubie
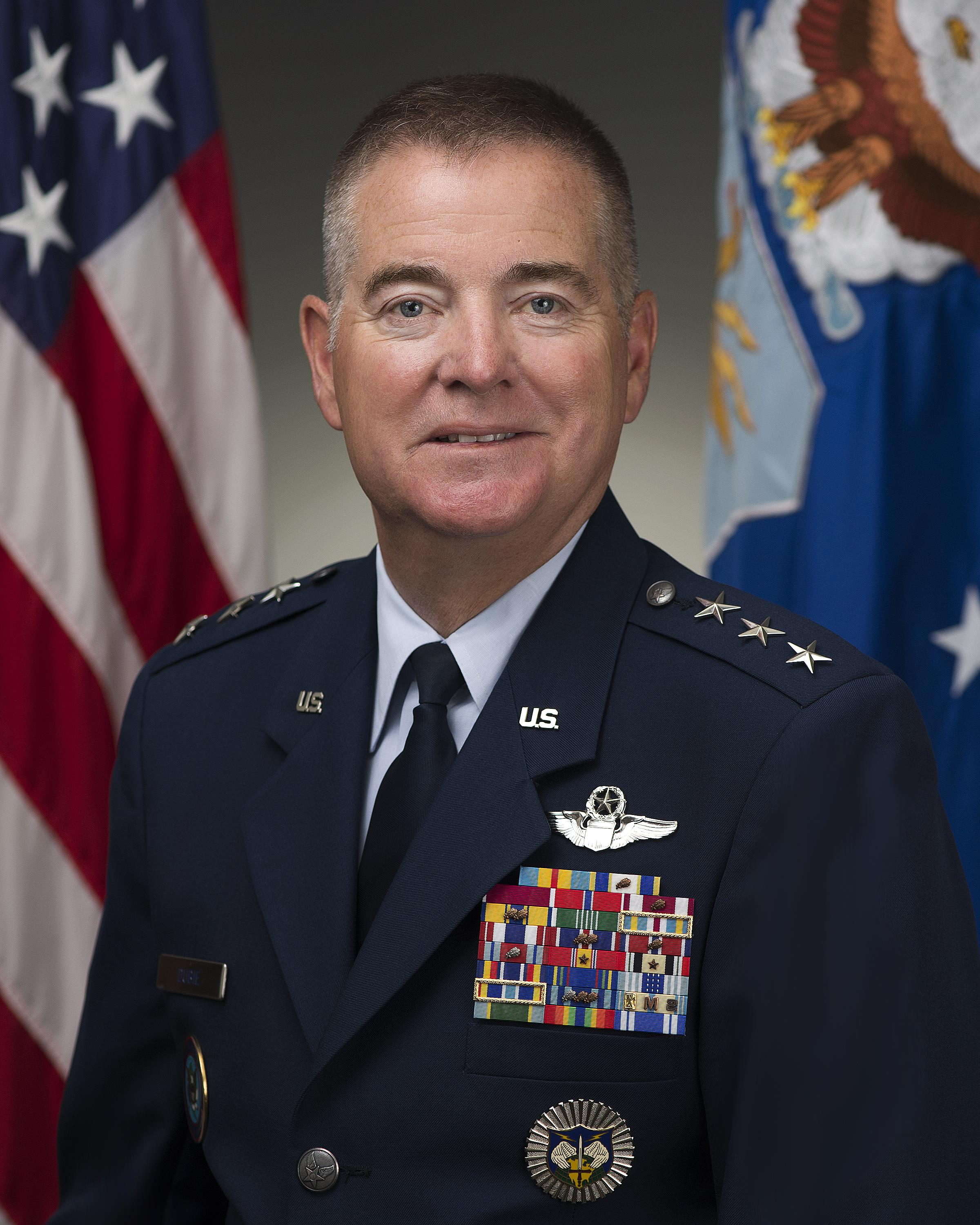
- Official portrait, 2015
- Born: 25 March 1960 (age 66); Burlington, Vermont, U.S.
- Relatives: Brian Dubie (brother)
- Military career
- Allegiance: United States
- Branch: United States Air Force
- Service years: 1981–2015
- Rank: Lieutenant General
- Commands: Vermont National Guard; 447th Air Expeditionary Group; 158th Operations Support Flight
- Conflicts: Iraq War
- Awards: Defense Distinguished Service Medal (2); Air Force Distinguished Service Medal (2); Legion of Merit; Bronze Star Medal
- Other work: Commercial airline pilot, Northwest Airlines; Corporate executive, Revision Military

Michael D. Dubie (born 25 March 1960) is a United States Air Force officer who attained the rank of lieutenant general while serving as the deputy commander of United States Northern Command from 2012 to 2015. From 2006 to 2012 he was Adjutant General of the State of Vermont, serving as the senior uniformed officer in the state responsible for the organization, training and equipage of the 4,000 members of the Vermont Army and Air National Guard. As adjutant general, he also served as inspector general, quartermaster general and head of the State Military Department, including Veterans Affairs.

== Early life ==
Michael David Dubie was born in Burlington, Vermont, on 25 March 1960. He is a 1978 graduate of Essex High School in Essex Junction, Vermont. Dubie graduated from the University of Vermont in 1982 with a bachelor's degree in economics.

== Military career ==
Dubie began his military career in 1979 at the University of Vermont's ROTC program and simultaneously joined the 150th Aviation Battalion in the Vermont Army National Guard. He was commissioned as a second lieutenant in 1981 and later transferred to the Vermont Air National Guard.

Dubie held a variety of command, supervisory and staff positions at the 158th Fighter Wing and Vermont State Headquarters and served as the assistant adjutant general responsible for the Vermont Joint Staff and Joint Force Headquarters. Additionally, Dubie commanded the 447th Air Expeditionary Group at the Baghdad International Airport and served as director of staff for the 332nd Air Expeditionary Wing, Balad Air Base, Iraq. Dubie is a command pilot with over 2,000 hours of military flying, the majority in the F-16.

Dubie became adjutant general in 2006, winning the legislative election to succeed Martha Rainville, who retired to run for the United States House of Representatives. Dubie won election to a full term in 2007, and was reelected in 2009 and 2011. (In Vermont, the adjutant general is elected for a two-year term by a secret ballot of the Vermont General Assembly.)

In 2010 Dubie became president of the Adjutants General Association of the United States.

Also in 2011 Dubie oversaw the Vermont National Guard's participation in the recovery following Hurricane Irene. This effort included providing emergency food and water, aiding individuals flooded out of their homes to move to temporary shelter, and assisting in debris removal and reconstructing roads and bridges.

In May 2012 Dubie was nominated to succeed Frank J. Grass as deputy commander of the United States Northern Command and recommended for promotion to lieutenant general. Later that month his promotion and appointment were confirmed by the United States Senate.

Dubie turned command of the Vermont National Guard over to Brigadier General Thomas E. Drew on 3 August 2012. Drew had previously served as deputy adjutant general.

Dubie was formally promoted to lieutenant general in a ceremony on 14 August 2012. His stars were pinned on by his wife and Lieutenant General Harry Wyatt, the director of the Air National Guard.

In July 2015 Dubie completed his assignment at NORTHCOM and returned to Vermont, where he performed administrative duties and out processing in anticipation of retiring in September. Major General Daniel R. Hokanson, the Adjutant General of Oregon, was announced as Dubie's successor at NORTHCOM.

Dubie retired in a ceremony held on 2 October 2015. At his retirement, Dubie received the Defense Distinguished Service Medal, which was presented by Senator Patrick Leahy.

== Civilian career ==
Prior to serving as adjutant general, Dubie was a pilot for Northwest Airlines. During his civilian career he flew the Boeing 727, Airbus 320, McDonnell Douglas DC-10, and Boeing 747-400.

In November 2015, Dubie joined Revision Military, a Vermont-based maker of military eyewear and other tactical gear, as head of the company's technology subsidiary, which conducts research and development of advanced manufacturing materials for use in protective equipment.

== Personal life ==
Dubie's brother Brian Dubie is the former Lieutenant Governor of Vermont and a retired colonel in the United States Air Force Reserve.

In 2011 Dubie received an honorary doctorate from the University of Vermont. In 2012 St. Michael's College also presented him with an honorary doctorate.

== Education ==
- 1982 Bachelor of Arts, Economics, University of Vermont, Burlington, Vermont
- 1995 Air Command and Staff College, correspondence program
- 1998 Air War College, in-residence program, (Award Recipient) Maxwell Air Force Base, Alabama
- 1999 Master of Arts Degree, International Relations, Norwich University, Northfield, Vermont
- 2003 Senior Executives in National and International Security, John F. Kennedy School of Government, Harvard University, Cambridge, Massachusetts

== Awards and decorations ==
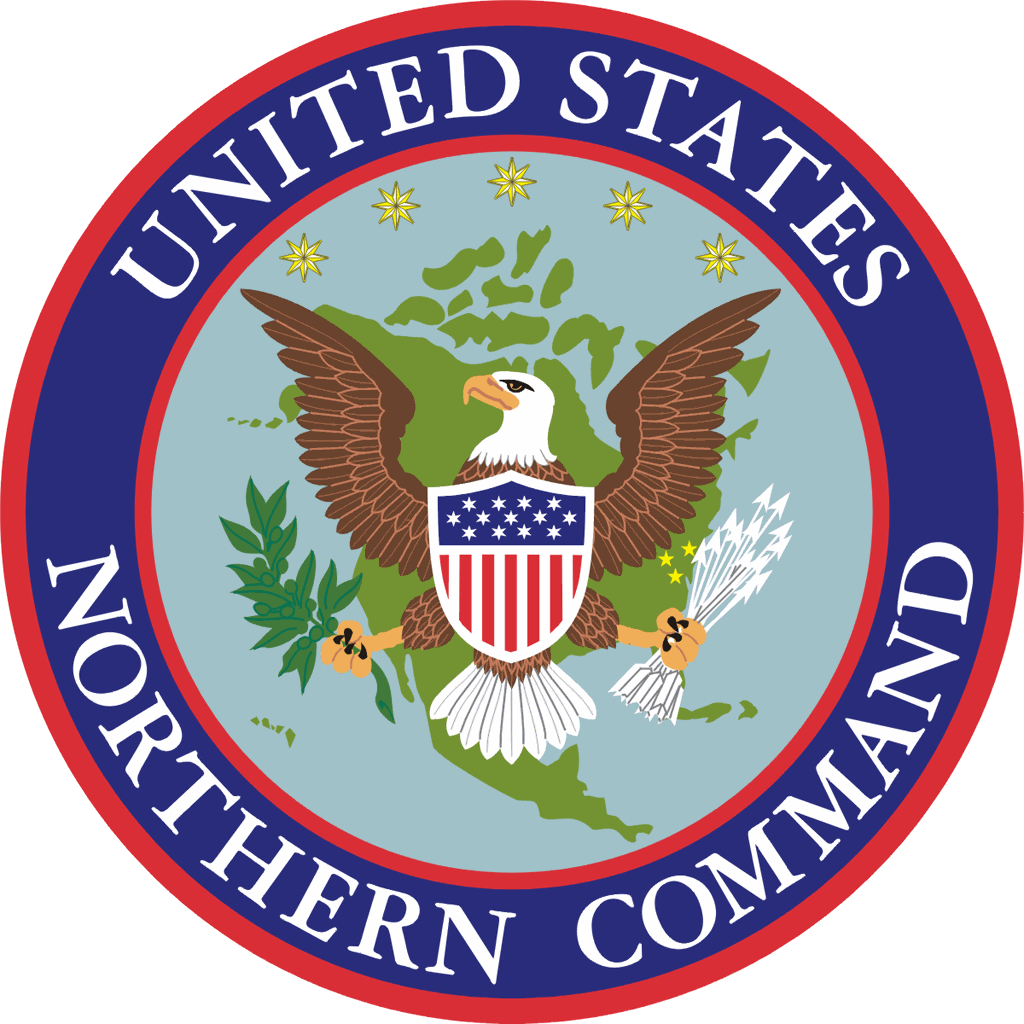
US Air Force Command Pilot Badge
North American Aerospace Defense Command Badge
United States Northern Command Badge

Personal decorations
	Defense Distinguished Service Medal with bronze oak leaf cluster
	Air Force Distinguished Service Medal with oak leaf cluster
Width-44 crimson ribbon with a pair of width-2 white stripes on the edges	Legion of Merit
	Bronze Star Medal
	Meritorious Service Medal with bronze oak leaf cluster
	Air Force Commendation Medal with two bronze oak leaf clusters
Width-44 myrtle green ribbon with width-3 white stripes at the edges and five width-1 stripes down the center; the central white stripes are width-2 apart	Army Commendation Medal
Unit awards
	Joint Meritorious Unit Award
	Air Force Meritorious Unit Award
	Air Force Outstanding Unit Award with two bronze oak leaf clusters
	Air Force Organizational Excellence Award with bronze oak leaf cluster
Service awards
	Combat Readiness Medal with silver oak leaf cluster
Campaign and service medals
	National Defense Service Medal with bronze service star
	Iraq Campaign Medal with bronze campaign star
	Global War on Terrorism Service Medal
Service, training, and marksmanship awards
	Nuclear Deterrence Operations Service Medal
	Air Force Overseas Short Tour Service Ribbon
	Air Force Expeditionary Service Ribbon with gold frame
	Air Force Longevity Service Award with silver and two bronze oak leaf clusters
	Armed Forces Reserve Medal with gold Hourglass device, M device and bronze award numeral 2
	Small Arms Expert Marksmanship Ribbon
Width-44 ribbon with width-6 central ultramarine blue stripe, flanked by pairs of stripes that are respectively width-4 emerald, width-3 golden yellow, width-5 orange, and width-7 scarlet	Army Service Ribbon
Foreign awards and decorations
	Canadian Meritorious Service Medal (Military)
State awards of the National Guard
	Vermont Distinguished Service Medal
	Vermont Commendation Medal
	Vermont Outstanding Unit Award
	Vermont Career Service Award

== External resources ==
- Michael D. Dubie at United States Air Force Senior Leader Biographies
- "Head Of Vt. Guard Targeted By Facebook Scam". Vermont Public Radio. 15 February 2011.
- Runnion, Norman (2 March 2006). "Dubie Brothers Are a Hit At Statehouse". The Herald of Randolph, VT.
- Odum (9 April 2006). "Dubie II Wastes no Time Getting Political". Green Mountain Daily. Archived from the original on 26 September 2007.

Military offices
Preceded by Martha Rainville	Vermont Adjutant General; 2006–2012	Succeeded by Thomas E. Drew
Preceded by Frank J. Grass	Deputy Commander of United States Northern Command; 2012–2015	Succeeded by Daniel R. Hokanson
