= Garchen Rinpoche =

Tibetan lama

His Eminence Garchen Triptrul Rinpoche
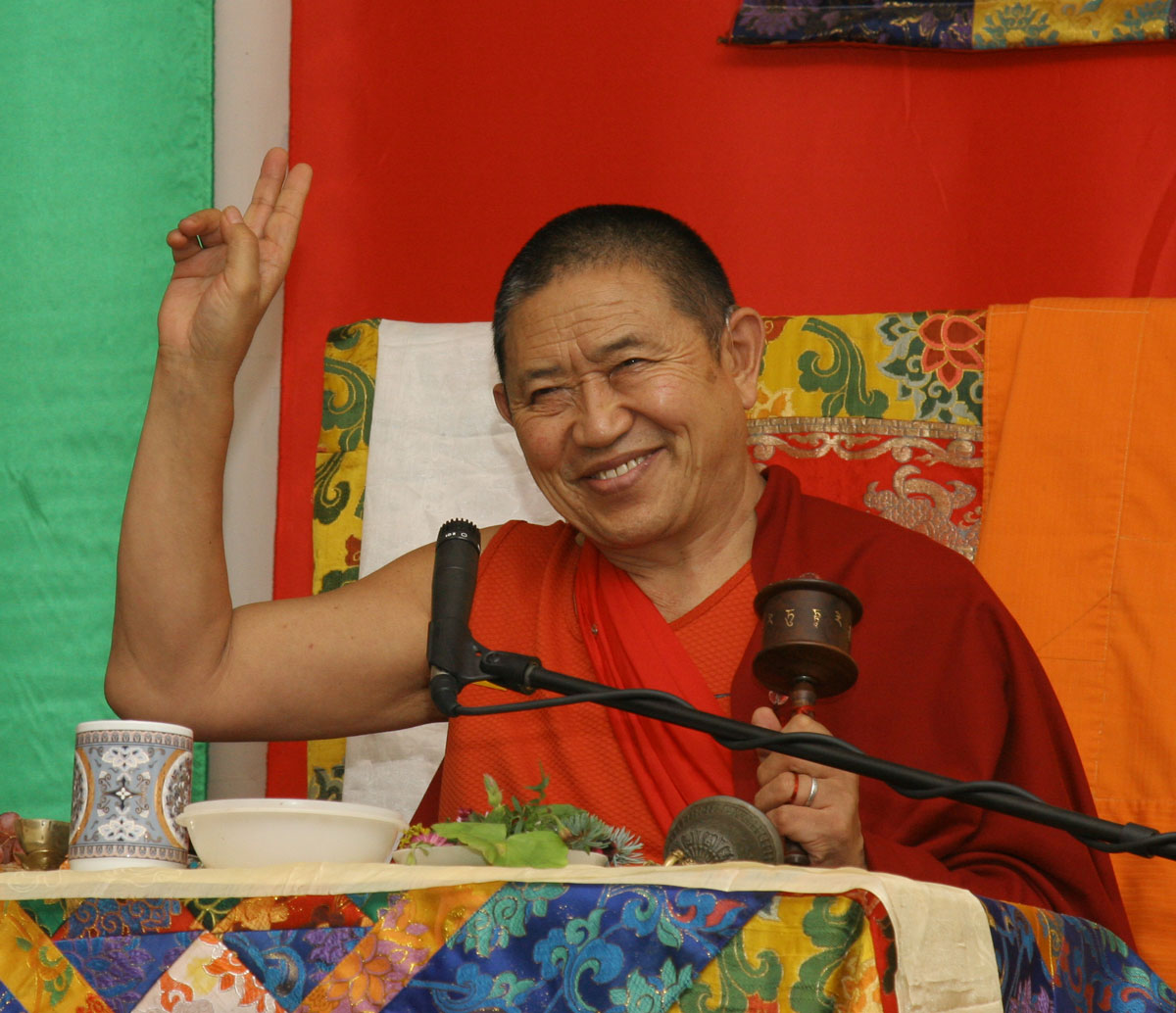
- Title: His Eminence the Eighth Garchen Rinpoche

Personal life
- Born: Konchog Gyaltsen; April 1936 (age 90) Nangchen, Kham, Tibet
- Website: https://garchen.net/

Religious life
- Religion: Tibetan Buddhism
- School: Kagyu
- Lineage: Drikung Kagyu

Senior posting
- Reincarnation: 7th Gar Rinpoche

The Eighth Garchen Rinpoche (Tib. མགར་ཆེན་རིན་པོ་ཆེ་, Wyl. mgar chen rin po che), also called Garchen Triptrul Rinpoche (Tib. མགར་ཆེན་ཁྲི་སྤྲུལ་རིན་པོ་ཆེ་, Wyl. mgar chen khri sprul rin po che), is a Tibetan Buddhist teacher in the Drikung Kagyu lineage. Born April 1936 in Nangchen, Kham, he is believed to be an incarnation of Siddha Gar Chödingpa, a heart-disciple of Jigten Sumgön, founder of the Drikung Kagyu lineage in the thirteenth century CE. He is also believed to have incarnated as Mahasiddha Aryadeva in ancient India - the lotus-born disciple of Nagarjuna himself. He was known as Lonpo Gar, the minister of Tibetan dharma king Songtsen Gampo in the seventh century CE.

== Biography ==
Garchen Rinpoche was seven years old when he was brought to Lho Miyal Monastery and given the ordination name of Könchok Gyaltsen (Tib. དཀོན་མཆོག་རྒྱལ་མཚན་, Wyl. dkon mchog rgyal mtshan). There he was recognized by Drikung Kyabgon Zhiwe Lodro, the 36th throne holder of the Drikung Kagyu lineage, where he was instructed by Siddha Chime Dorje and other high lamas of the Drikung Kagyu Lineage. At the age of 19, Garchen Rinpoche entered into a three year retreat which was interrupted after two and a half years due to the Cultural Revolution in China.

When he was 22 he was imprisoned by the Chinese for 20 years and put in a labor camp. During that time he met with Khenpo Munsel who became his root guru. Khenpo Munsel was a Nyingma master who taught him during the whole 20 years of his imprisonment. During that time, while enduring the labor camp hardships, Garchen Rinpoche kept on practicing in secret, according to his guru's instructions until he achieved the wisdom-mind which Khenpo Musel called "an emanation of a Bodhisattva".

Garchen Rinpoche was released from prison in 1979. As soon as he was released, he took it upon himself to rebuild the Drikung Kagyu monasteries, reestablish the Buddhist teachings, and build two boarding schools for local children in eastern Tibet.

Garchen Rinpoche first came to North America in 1997, teaching in Canada and the United States. One of his first teachings in the United States was based on the mahamudra writings and instructions of the founder of the Drikung lineage and his quintessential mind teachings.

== Current activities and expertise ==
Garchen Rinpoche is the founder and spiritual director of the Garchen Buddhist Institute in Chino Valley, Arizona, the Drikung Mahayana Center in North Potomac, Maryland and Gar Drolma Choling in Dayton, Ohio. Rinpoche is also the spiritual director of many other Dharma centers and teaches throughout North America, Asia, and Europe. Starting in 2020, because of his age, Rinpoche stopped traveling to different Dharma centers all over the world, and retired at his main seat, the Garchen Buddhist Institute. He has been giving empowerments, teachings, and holding Dharma events there since then, including online streaming for these.

Rinpoche is a master of Dzogchen, the fivefold practice Mahamudra, the Six Yogas of Naropa, and the preliminary practices (Tib. ngöndro). He widely promotes Thogme Zangpo's Thirty-Seven Practices of a Bodhisattva and White Tara practice.
