= Mind teachings of Tibet =

Tibetan Buddhist teachings that point directly to the Nature of Mind

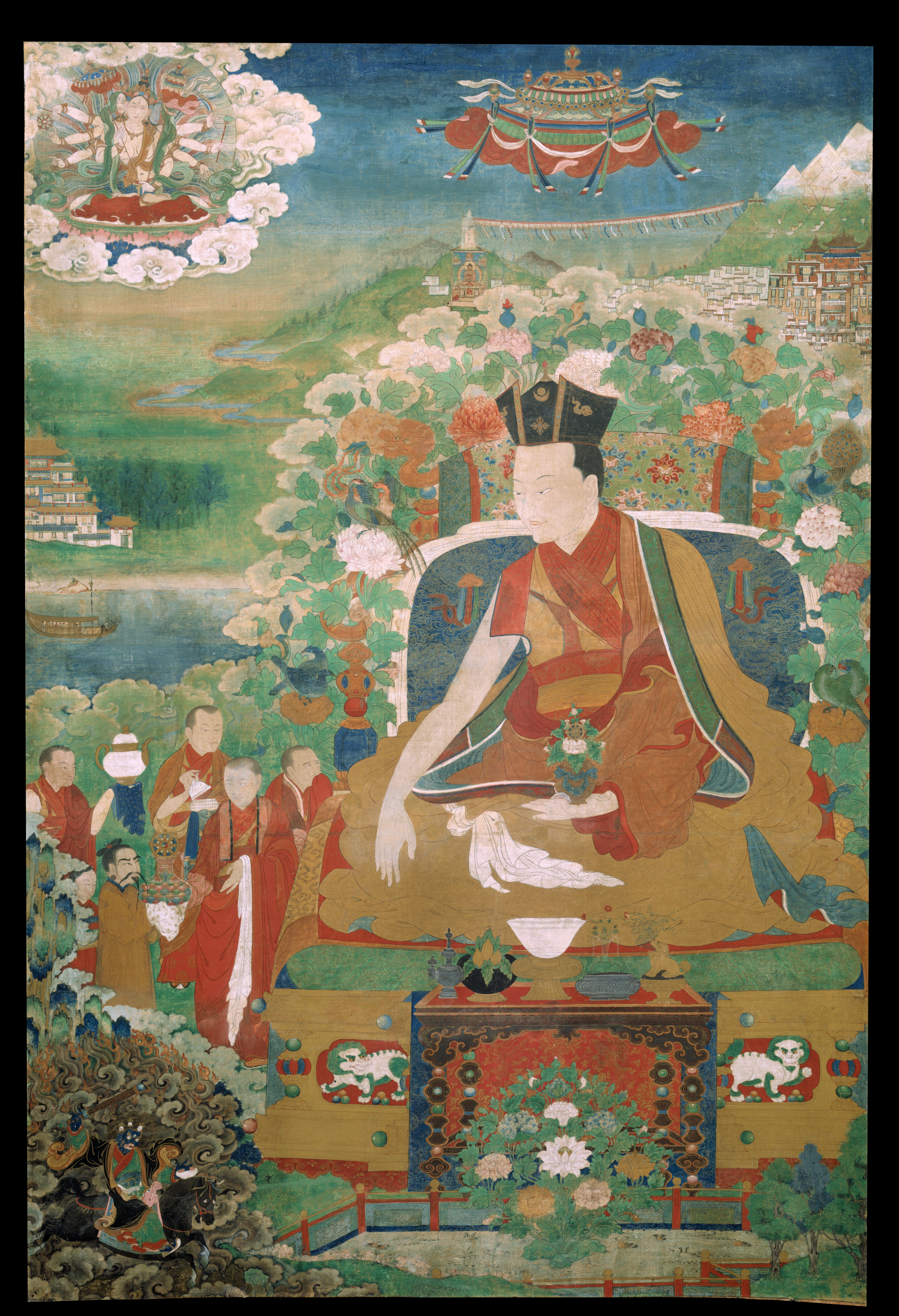
The Ninth Karmapa, Wangchug Dorje (1555–1603)

The mind teachings of Tibet (Wylie: sems khrid) are a body of sacredly held instructions on the nature of mind and the practice of meditation on, or in accordance with, that nature. Although maintained and cultivated, to various degrees, within each of the major Tibetan Buddhist traditions, they are primarily associated with the mahamudra traditions of the Kagyu and the dzogchen traditions of the Nyingma.

The mind teachings of Tibet are generally believed to have originated with Shakyamuni Buddha, although the recorded lineages only trace back to adepts from various regions of the Pala Empire within the Medieval India era between the 7th and 11th century (CE.) After the great Tibetan diaspora in 1959, the mind teachings were among the first Tibetan Dharma teachings identified for preservation and propagation, an effort which assumed an increased sense of urgency under the direction of the 14th Dalai Lama as the full scope of the destruction to Tibet's religious and cultural heritage became apparent. Important treatises by the illustrious Nyingmapa Longchenpa (1308–1364) and the Kagyu master Wangchuk Dorje, 9th Karmapa Lama (1556–1603) were among the earliest of the works published by the Library of Tibetan Works and Archives (LTWA.)

The first Nyingma work by Longchenpa published by LTWA was based on the four dharmas of Gampopa (1079–1153), the founder of the Dagpo Kagyu. The first mahamudra work published by them was a concise, yet comprehensive, Karma Kagyu mahamudra meditation manual by Wangchuk Dorje, "pertaining to ancient Tibetan traditions of the mind."

In addition to texts published by, or in cooperation, with LTWA, Kagyu and Nyingma leaders independently pursued other avenues to further the preservation of their most important works. By the dawn of the 21st century, the two most highly regarded Tibetan works on the nature of the mind, and the practice of meditation on, and in accordance with, that nature, were translated by highly qualified translators and published openly in English.

== Important texts ==
The foremost mind teaching treatise to be identified among the Kagyu traditions was a masterful presentation of the quintessential instructions of mahamudra by Dakpo Tashi Namgyal (1512–1587), colloquially referred to as "Moonbeams of Mahamudra" (Wylie: phyag chen zla ba'i 'od zer). In 1969, Dukchen Thuksey Rinpoche (1916–1983), the acting head of the Drukpa Kagyu, and, shortly thereafter, Rangjung Rigpe Dorje, 16th Karmapa (1924–1981), the head of the Karma Kagyu, independently requested the Tibetan-English translator Lobsang P. Lhalungpa to undertake the translation of this voluminous work, which involved the task of translating a variety of forms of classical Tibetan, written in literary styles spanning several centuries. It was published and made accessible, without restrictions, in 1986, under the title, Mahamudra - The Moonlight: Quintessence of Mind and Meditation.

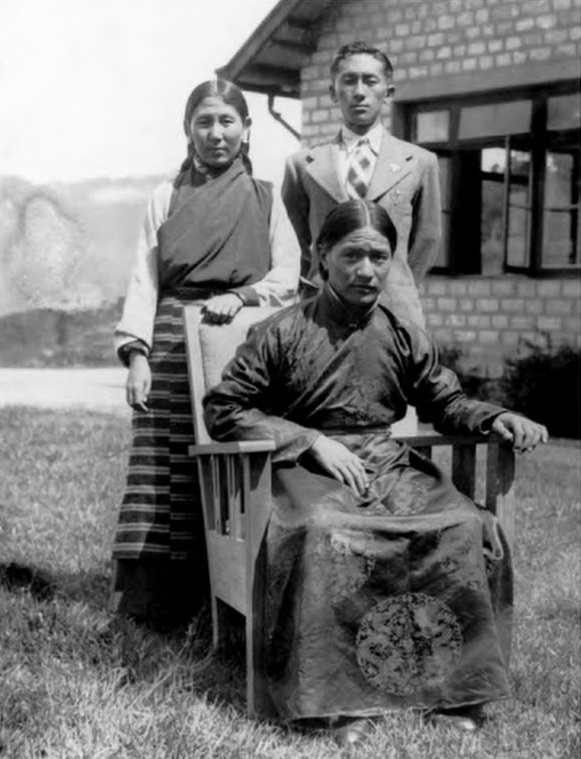
Dudjom Rinpoche with Prince Paljor Namgyal and Maharani Kunzang Dechen Tshomo Namgyal

With respect to dzogchen, the highest and final vehicle of the nine yanas of the Nyingma, the Seven Treasuries of Longchenpa were identified early on by Dudjom Rinpoche, the first selected head of the Nyingma, as most important for preservation, and which, in their entirety, were significantly larger than "Moonbeams of Mahamudra."

The 14th Dalai Lama also independently stated that two of the Seven Treasuries are exceptionally noteworthy, summarizing his views as, "Only by comprehending the practices of the Great Perfection based on these two texts (The Treasury of the Dharmadhātu and The Treasury of the Supreme Vehicle) can you hope to have a good reliable understanding of the Great Perfection (Dzogchen.)" The Treasury of the Dharmadhātu, colloquially known in Tibetan as the "Chöying Dzöd", was also called by him "the key to dzogchen." It was to become the first of these two treasures translated (along with some of the other treasures) over a period of several years by a team led by Richard Barron under the direction of Chagdud Tulku Rinpoche (1930–2002), and published in 2001 under the title, A Treasure Trove of Scriptural Transmission. This translation included the root text and, most importantly, the full auto-commentary by Longchenpa; the root text only was also published separately in 2001, with both Tibetan and English depictions, under the title of The Treasury of the Basic Space of Phenomena.

== Preservation of oral instruction ==
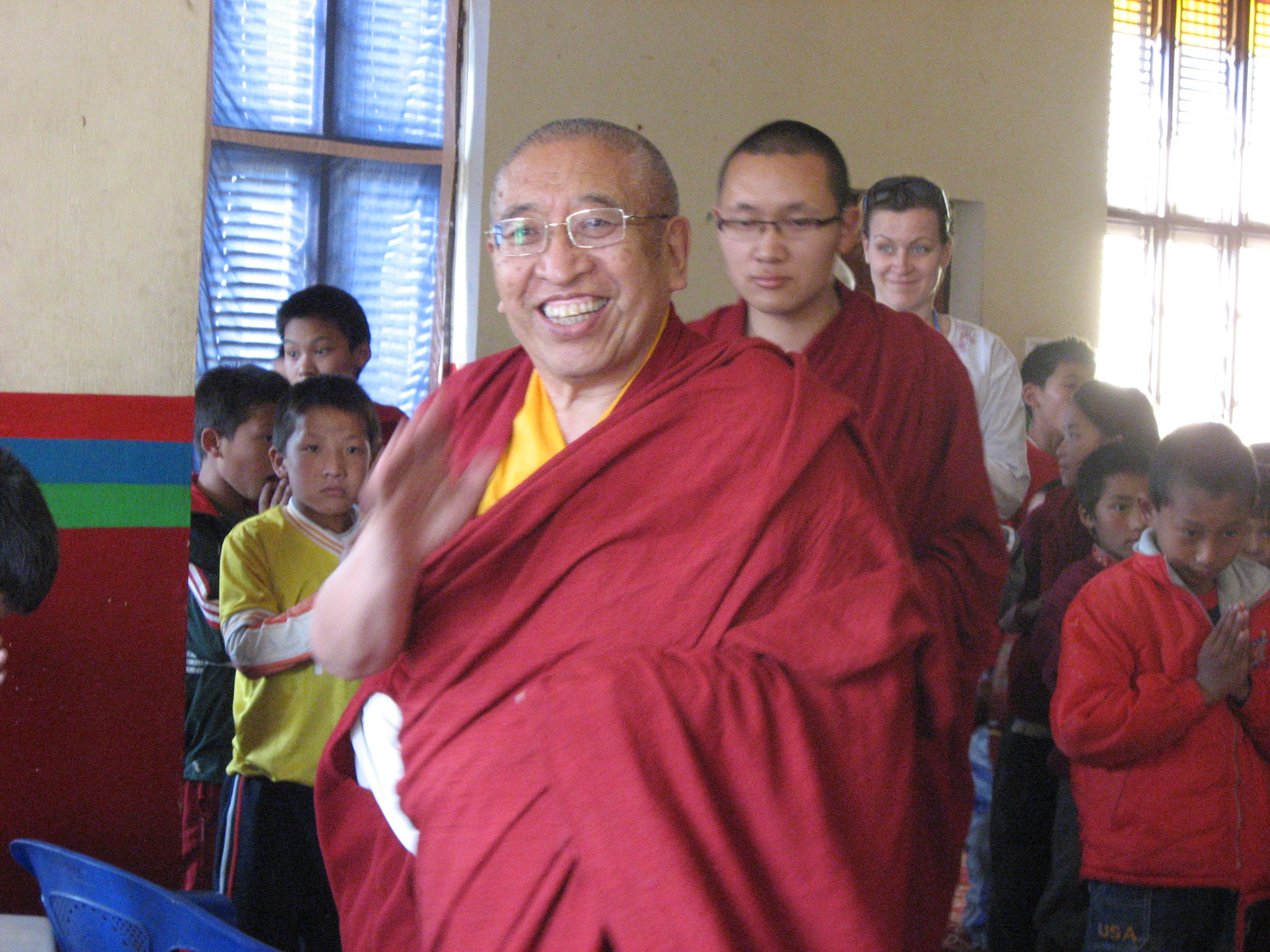
Khenchen Thrangu Rinpoche in Nepal, 2008

A call for the propagation of the teachings of mahamudra first rose to prominence in the 1970s when, during his travels in the West, Rangjung Rigpe Dorje proclaimed, "of all meditations, Mahamudra would be of the most benefit for Westerners, because it deals directly with mind itself and is therefore accessible to people of any culture." It was based on his advice and request that the scholar-monk of the Karma Kagyu tradition, Khenchen Thrangu Rinpoche (1933–2023), followed up on the English publication of "Moonbeams of Mahamudra" by presenting a comprehensive series of instructions on it over a period of six years. In addition, for more than four decades, he provided oral instructions and transmissions on several other mahamudra meditation manuals, and their ancillary texts, all with the intent of allowing the teachings to benefit as many as possible. Thrangu Rinpoche noted that it was "important that this highest, or deepest, teaching should be readily available to all who are interested in practicing it," reaffirming the stance maintained within his tradition that mahamudra should be available as a complete and distinct "path to liberation" (Wylie: grol lam) – both independent of, and interdependent with, its tantric methods. In this manner, he followed in the footsteps of not only the 16th century Dakpo Tashi Namgyal (who was among the first to preserve the oral instructions of Tibet in writing, after xylographic methods of printing developed in China, were finally adopted in Tibet), and the 12th century Gampopa but also in those of the earliest recorded adepts of his tradition, dating from around the 8th century.

A few years later, another branch of the Kagyu, the Drikung Kagyu, realized the translation of its text on the mind teachings, a very early Tibetan mahamudra written work by its founder Jigten Sumgön (1143–1217), who is frequently quoted in "Moonbeams of Mahamudra" and other mahamudra texts. This work is historically important since it was the first meditation manual on mahamudra written by a Tibetan and is most representative of the extant oral instructions of its time. Although the Drikung are generally known for maintaining a five-fold path consisting of the practices of bodhicitta, yidam deity meditation, guru yoga, mahamudra and dedication of merit, according to Kyabgön Chetsang Rinpoche, one of the heads of the Drikung lineage, the manual demonstrates that the Drikung have also maintained mahamudra as a complete and independent path for students, and not only as part of their five-fold path. The text was translated by Khenpo Konchog Tamphel and published in 2004 under the title, Introduction to Mahamudra the Co-emergent Unification: An Ornament which is the Luminosity of the Primordial Awareness that Dispels the Darkness of Ignorance.

The oral instructions on this work had previously been presented in North America, in 1997, by Garchen Rinpoche, after his release from two decades of internment within a People's Republic of China (PRC) labor camp. During its presentation, it was translated into English by the author and great abbot Khenchen Könchog Gyaltsen Rinpoche, and published that same year, edited by a former student of Dukchen Thuksey Rinpoche, a Westerner with experience in Mahamudra practice. Garchen Rinpoche was also known as a dzogchen adept, having studied and practiced dzogchen in secret during his internment, under the guidance of his root teacher, Khenpo Munsel (1916–1994) of Kathok Monastery. Khenpo Munsel was well known as one of the chief disciples, along with Khyentse Chökyi Lodrö (1893–1959) and Chatral Rinpoche (1913–2015), of the author of A Guide to the Words of My Perfect Teacher, Khenpo Ngagchung (1879–1941.)

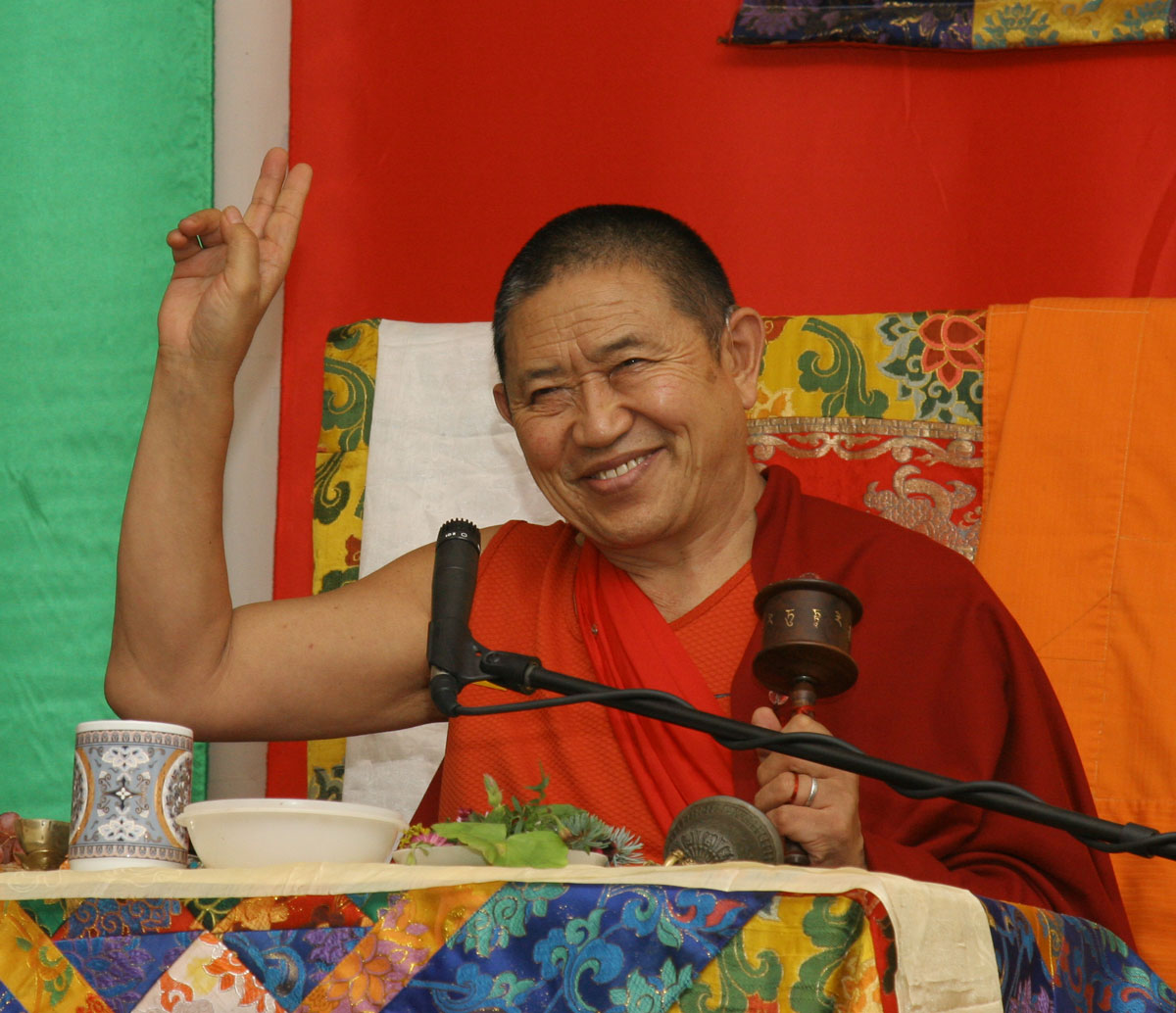
Garchen Rinpoche

The tradition of ensuring that oral instructions are provided to illuminate traditional written texts, whether original teachings attributed to Shakyamuni Buddha (Kangyur) or subsequent treatises and commentaries (Tengyur), is just as important among the Nyingma as it is among the Kagyu. In the Nyingma schools, by the end of the 19th century, texts which were records of important oral introductions to, and teachings on, dzogchen were increasingly in circulation, such as those of Patrul Rinpoche (1808–1887) on "The Three Words that Strike the Crucial Point" by Garab Dorje (c. 7th century.)

By 1998, one of the scholar-monks of the Nyingma, Khenchen Palden Sherab Rinpoche (1938–2010), along with his brother, Khenpo Tsewang Dongyal Rinpoche, in accordance with the wishes of their teacher, Dudjom Rinpoche, provided comprehensive oral introductions to dzogchen and the practice of "trekcho" or "Cutting Through" (Wylie: khregs chod), also known as "kadag trekcho" ("Cutting Through to Primordial Purity"), from dzogchen's most important Direct Instruction Series (Wylie: man ngag sde) in reliance upon those texts. Their teachings were translated into English and published, along with the other two texts, in the book entitled, Lion's Gaze, translated into English by Sarah Harding. In the publication, they emphasize the importance of putting the instructions into practice by noting, "Books alone won't do it. All Buddha's teachings maintain that knowing comes through direct experience, then practice maintains this experience. This is how realization happens. The great Dudjom Rinpoche in his pith instructions said that realization comes through practice." They encourage a student to practice trekcho even throughout the night, "in sleep. Keep the practice day and night. That view, that courage is necessary."

Lion's Gaze was preceded by earlier efforts, in the 1980s, including those by Namkhai Norbu (1938–2018) who had elected to extend his teachings on dzogchen beyond a small group of students in Italy to a broader audience, by publishing them and excerpts from Longchenpa, and by ensuring their translation into English. At the time, he also was one of the first in the West to offer dzogchen as a complete path, independent of tantric empowerment. Some of Namkhai Norbu Rinpoche's early instructions were preserved in books, including The Cycle of Day and Night, a text written by him based primarily on his experiences with dzogchen in relation to its Space Series (Wylie: klong sde) and dealing with achieving an all-around uninterrupted presence of awareness.

It was with the publication of high-quality translations of the sacred texts of mahamudra and dzogchen and their corresponding oral instructions – the latter often presented by one or more highly qualified scholar-monks or great khenpos (Wylie: mkhan chen) within the Kagyu or Nyingma lineages – that a reliable means of the study and practice of the mind teachings first became widely available beyond the borders of Tibet.

== Reasons for meditating ==
In "Moonbeams of Mahamudra," Dakpo Tashi Namgyal gives two reasons why meditating on the nature of mind is important.

First, he points out that, experientially, everything that one knows directly or through inferences arises only as appearances to and within one's mind (Wylie: snang sems). Since mind and its various phenomena are the basis for experience, he quotes a Buddhist sutrā that states, "All things encompassing the phenomena of existence and enlightenment saṃsāra and nirvāṇa are of the mind." Secondly, it follows that, since all appearances occur only in each of our individual minds, it would be of benefit to understand the nature of that mind, and its appearances, while a perpetuation of misunderstandings of mind, and its appearances, could clearly lead one in meaningless directions.

In scriptural support of these points, Dakpo Tashi Namgyal quotes Shantideva from the Bodhisattvacaryāvatāra:

If one does not know the secret nature of the mind
Which is the essence of all Dharma
One might wander aimlessly,
Though one wished to be happy and eliminate misery.
Wisdom does not arise without meditating upon tranquility;
Enlightenment does not arise without the emergence of wisdom.

He further notes that, in mahamudra, Buddhist tranquility meditation (Sanskrit (Skt.): Śamaṭha), not only provides one the opportunity to tame one's mind, but it also serves as a constant and essential companion to insight meditation (Skt. Vipaśyanā). Collectively (Samatha-vipassana), their unity "causes one to perceive the true nature of reality and enables one to set spiritual trainees on the path to enlightenment and to achieve other virtues."

Both the Nyingma and the Kagyu recognize the importance of honoring gradual (e.g., with stages), as well as sudden and more immediate paths to the dawning of wisdom. In the Kagyu tradition, a student is usually first introduced to general Buddhist tranquility and insight meditations, before being introduced to specific, or extraordinary, mahamudra tranquility and insight meditations, in that order; however, on occasion, a student may receive instruction to insight meditations, or the nature of mind itself, first or early on. In dzogchen, the ninth of the nine vehicles of the Nyingma tradition, introduction to the nature of awareness often occurs early on, since dzogchen is a path that starts with and is based on intrinsic wisdom, in contrast to a path which emphasizes a more gradual cultivation of wisdom and its discovery.

The prayer "Aspiration of Mahamudra" was written by Rangjung Dorje, 3rd Karmapa Lama (1284–1339), who held both Kagyu and Nyingma lineages of his time and who had studied dzogchen under the same teacher as Longchenpa, Rigdzin Kumaraja (1266–1343). Rangjung Dorje presents the roles of the three different types of wisdom on the path of mahamudra as follows:

Hearing the scriptures and logic brings freedom from the clouds of ignorance.
Contemplating the instructions defeats the darkness of doubt.
The light of meditation illuminates the true nature, just as it is.
May the radiance of the three wisdoms increase.

All Buddhist traditions, including the Nyingma and Kagyu, rely on the wisdoms (Skt. prajna) of hearing (Wylie: thos pa'i shes rab) and contemplation (Wylie: bsam pa'i shes rab); in addition, both mahamudra and the dzogchen place exceptionally strong emphasis on the third wisdom, a non-conceptual wisdom, dawning directly from yogic perception or cognition (Wylie: rnal 'byor mngon sum tshad ma) and a profound illumination dawning through meditation (Wylie: sgom pa'i shes rab).

== Nyingma approach ==
In the Nyingma traditions, most students begin their studies with the Words of My Perfect Teacher or The Nectar of Manjushri's Speech: A Detailed Commentary on Shantideva's Way of the Bodhisattva. Students wishing to explore the philosophical frameworks associated with this tradition may elect to read and study a more extensive work such as, The Adornment of the Middle Way: Shantarakshita's Madhyamakalankara with commentary by Jamgön Mipham. The four thoughts of the common preliminaries are always emphasized on the path, as is the case in the Kagyu traditions. Although dzogchen is also taught as a path independent of tantra, and therefore strictly not requiring empowerments, tantric preliminaries are often combined with its special preliminaries, as in the newer Longchen Nyingthig or Dudjom Tersar traditions. Lion's Gaze notes that after the common and special ngondro practices, there is a set of beginning or preparation practices to the main body of dzogchen called "khorde rushan" (Wylie: 'khor 'das ru shan) and introduces them briefly, including the outer, inner and secret practices, noting beforehand that, "Most interest in dzogchen arose after the 17th century, and some masters began teaching larger groups with more than twenty or thirty students at a time. The emphasis remained the same, receptivity to the teachings was and still is the key to realization."

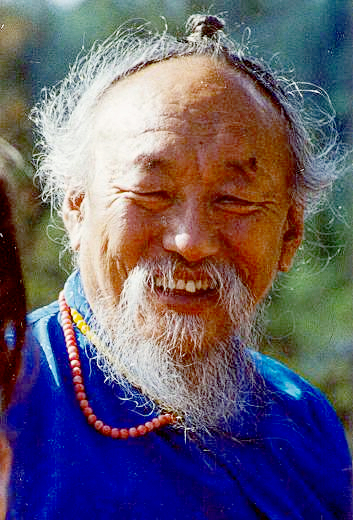
Chagdud tulku rinpoche

Great emphasis in the Nyingma tradition is also placed on working with a qualified teacher, should one be available (and availability of qualified teachers had already become an issue in the 17th century, in part due to the increasing popularity), and on laying a suitable groundwork by reading and studying its foundational and philosophical texts. Regarding finding qualified guidance – and this is still emphasized, in the case of the "Chöying Dzöd," the profundity of its topics is such that it is said that even with personal guidance by a great teacher (such as Nyoshul Lungtok (1829–1901), a student of the Paltrul Rinpoche), a fully qualified student (such as Khenpo Ngakchung (1879–1941)) may require an extensive period of reflection and practice based on that guidance, to fully comprehend its significance. Tulku Thondup Rinpoche (1939–2023) notes how Nyoshul Lungtok told his student, Khenpo Ngakchung, "You must study it and treasure the understanding of its meaning in your mind" and yet, in spite of his many fervent prayers to Longchenpa, Khenpo Ngakchung, after some time, relayed back to his teacher that he still "didn’t have much understanding." So Nyoshul Lungtok then provided further clarification instruction and encouragement and, after awhile, Khenpo Ngakchung reports back, describing it as follows:

After that I studied Choying Dzod again and again and arrived at an awareness that wasn't the same as what I had earlier. I presented this discovery to him (Nyoshul Lungtok) and he said, "That is right! Progress is made gradually."

=== Nyingma key texts ===
The "Chöying Dzöd" (including the detailed auto-commentary by Longchenpa) dedicates its first nine chapters on the view of dzogchen, before introducing meditation practice in one chapter based on that view, thereby underscoring the importance of establishing a correct introduction to the view of dzogchen as a basis for meditation.

In introducing dzogchen view and practice in the West in London in 1984, the 14th Dalai Lama based his instructions on the Patrul Rinpoche and Garab Dorje texts later included in Lion's Gaze. He ensured that his teachings on these texts were published at the outset of his own new book, published in 2000, which also included a 1989 presentation on dzogchen drawn primarily from Longchenpa's "Chöying Dzöd." In this manner, a reader would benefit from receiving an introduction to dzogchen along the lines of Lion's Gaze, before going on to read and consider his teachings on the "Chöying Dzöd." He also points out the uniqueness of the approach of dzogchen, stating:

…the special feature of Dzogchen is that the path is created through wisdom. In the Nyingma tradition, the teachings are divided into nine vehicles. Among them are the eight which are philosophical systems that depend on ordinary consciousness, meaning they employ the ordinary mind. In Dzogchen, or Atiyoga, however, the path is created with wisdom, which transcends the ordinary mind or consciousness altogether. There is an enormous difference between a path created with the ordinary mind and a path created through wisdom."

The non-sectarian Jamgon Kongtrul (1813–1899) originally pointed out the importance, particularly in dzogchen, of establishing the correct view or experience of the view at the outset, whether based on directly heard, or on written, pointing-out instructions, or on pointing-out by other means.

In conclusion to his presentation on dzogchen and the "Chöying Dzöd", the Dalai Lama advises:

What I have taught so far should be taken simply as a key, a basis or a source, which should be complemented later on by further reading, meditation and practice. Only then will what I have taught here become beneficial and fruitful. For an actual practitioner of Dzogchen, what is of vital importance is to maintain a continuous effort in your practice…I would like to reiterate: to have a real experience and realization of an advanced level of the path, it is crucial to lay a firm foundation and grounding in the paths. That is why in the Dzogchen system, great emphasis is placed on the preliminaries….The complete preliminary practices are explained systematically in great detail in a text called The Words of My Perfect Teacher… composed by Dza Patrul Rinpoche, as notes taken at a teaching by his teacher Jikmé Gyalwé Nyugu. This text has been translated and is available in English. So if you maintain a sustained effort, without losing your hope or your courage, you will make progress along your spiritual path, and that is certain.

The importance of the "Chöying Dzöd," and the great reverence by which it is held, is apparent from the introduction to it, in which Tulku Thondup Rinpoche quotes Patrul Rinpoche's statement that the text itself embodies "the meaning of the innate mind, dharmakaya. It elucidates naked primordial wisdom without affirming or denying anything. It is the heart essence of the visions of the Omniscient Lama Longchen Rabjam. It is the most profound of all the teachings." In addition, Tulku Thondup Rinpoche writes:

For centuries, it has remained one of the most sacred meditation manuals and has inspired thousands to attain the ultimate realization of Dzogpa Chenpo.

== Kagyu approach ==
In the Kagyu tradition, Lhalungpa notes that lay students often begin their studies with The Jewel Ornament of Liberation by Gampopa or the Bodhisattvacaryāvatāra by Shantideva. At the outset, emphasis is placed on the cultivation of bodhicitta and engendering the motivation to study and practice the mind teachings of mahamudra for the benefit of all beings, including oneself. Some students, at this stage, also pursue meditations on Buddhist philosophical frameworks, such as those summarized by Khenpo Tsultrim Gyamtso Rinpoche, or explore traditional instructions on the Heart Sutra, Madhyamaka or Uttaratantraśāstra to begin to understand the meaning of emptiness (Skt: Śūnyatā), in relation to “Buddha Nature“ and reflect on some of their associated profound views, such as the axioms stating that relative phenomena are "empty of self" and absolute phenomena are "empty of other."

In the introduction to "Moonbeams of Mahamudra," Lhalungpa emphasizes that, "Like other great Buddhist treatises it is studied under the guidance of a chosen teacher. The need for a tutor becomes apparent when one considers the magnitude of this very esoteric work, the profundity of the subject..." The text begins by drawing from essential knowledge and methods from the areas on ethics vinaya, logic (pramāṇa), and psychology (abhidharma), including the basis for aggregates of consciousness and the ongoing experiential sense of self consciousness known by each of us. It then presents aspects of the Buddha's transcendental wisdom (prajñāpāramitā) and various approaches to achieving insight into the emptiness of self and all phenomena or realities (Skt. sarvadharma-śūnyatā) as their true state.

Oral instructions on "Moonbeams of Mahamudra," such as those given by Khenchen Thrangu Rinpoche, or the translation of it interwoven with oral instructions, such as presented by Traleg Kyabgon Rinpoche (1955–2010), are considered, within the Kagyu traditions, to serve as a reliable and invaluable gateway to this comprehensive text. Lhalungpa notes that oral instructions are of three types, "There are various forms of explaining the texts: a simple literal explanation (tsigtri), a full explanation (dontri), and an experiential elucidation (nyamtri or martri) based on the teacher's personal experience." He also points out how the most vital instructions stem from interaction with a personal lineage teacher, "The most important of all is the elucidation on each successive stage, which requires the student to meditate for a period of time and then to relate his experience to the teacher. This leads to regular discussions with the teacher in respect to the practice, its problems, and its progress. All the various orders of Tibetan Buddhism practice these oral transmissions."

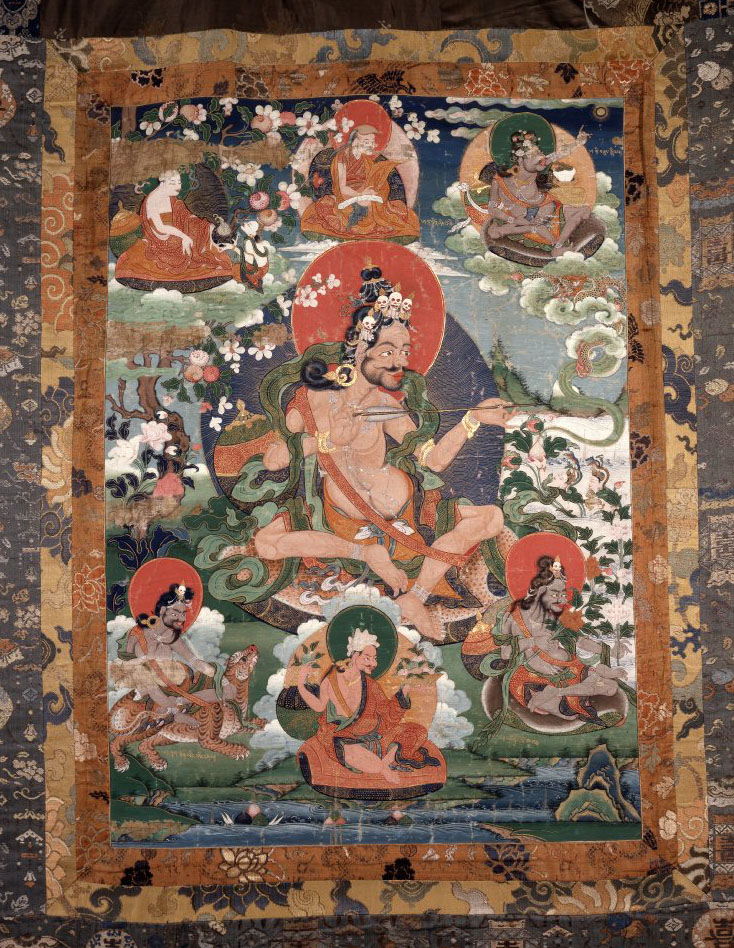
Saraha (British Museum)

Additionally, the study of some of the texts and songs quoted in "Moonbeams of Mahamudra" is encouraged, as they provide a student with both breadth and depth. Among these, "Aspiration of Mahamudra," written by Rangjung Dorje, provides an excellent overview of mahamudra; two other texts, composed by Rangjung Dorje specifically for those interested in studying mahamudra, "Distinguishing Consciousness from Wisdom," a treatise on Buddhist psychology related to its abhidharma, and "A Treatise on Buddha Nature", are also considered to be very helpful. An additional support, prior to or concurrent to studying the main text itself, are the oral instructions provided on one or more of the historical Dohas composed by one of the great adepts associated with the tradition, such as those of Sarāha or Naropa.

=== Kagyu key texts ===
Study and practice of the main body of Moonbeams of Mahamudra itself is traditionally divided into its two parts.

Part One, entitled "A Concise Elucidation of the Common System of Tranquil Equipoise", covers the guidance instructions for common (to all Buddhist traditions) tranquility meditation and insight meditation practices, first emphasizing each approach's individual distinctions and then making clear how to practice them completely in unity. In relation to insight, Dakpo Tashi Namgyal draws from the Saṃdhinirmochana-sūtra of the Buddha, the doctrines of Maitreya, the Abhidharma-samuccaya by Asaṅga, the Prajñāpāramitopadeśa of Ratnākaraśānti, and the treatises of the Bhāvanākrama by Kamalaśīla, and also presents the views and contemplations of other schools, with emphasis on the doctrines on "selflessness."

Part Two, entitled "An Extensive Elucidation of Mahāmudrā, the uncommon mahamudra meditation", presents the main body of the mahamudra theory and practices. In the first two chapters, it begins by covering topics to engender confidence in the teachings and the approaches of mahamudra (Chapter 1) and then summarizes both the common (reflection on the "four thoughts") and the special preliminary practices (Chapter 2.) In recent centuries, special preliminaries have frequently been incorporated into a small set of tantric practices (which traditionally require empowerments, such as Vajrasattva), although Gampopa and Dakpo Tashi Namgyal both regarded the tantric elements as optional, and not to be required for proceeding with the study and practice of mahamudra itself.

The next two chapters of Part Two then present in-depth instructions with emphasis on mahamudra tranquility meditation (Chapter 3) and mahamudra insight meditation (Chapter 4.)

The remaining chapters of Part Two (Chapters 5–9) present the advanced body of teachings on mahamudra, outlined as follows:

The Stages of Virtuous Practice
1. Understanding the system of absorption at the start
2. The actual identification of spontaneous coemergence
3. The elimination of flaws and the appreciation of the meaning of meditation

Consolidation of Experience in Meditation: How to Maintain Absorption and Postabsorption
1. The reason for maintaining meditation even after gaining insight into the identity of virtuous contemplation
2. How specifically to maintain absorption and postabsorption

Consolidation of Experience in Meditation: How to Get Rid of Meditative Deviation
1. The elimination of aberration and deviation with regard to absorptive equipoise
2. The methods of removing obstacles to meditation

Determining the Mind to Be Expansive, Open, and Nonarising
1. The epithet, significance, and time of determining the mind
2. Determining the abiding nature of the mind
3. Watching the mind's inner face as the basis of determination
4. Being aware of the mind’s nonarising openness
5. Remaining in the state of determinate awareness throughout the day and night

The Resultant Dawning of Realization
1. Differentiating the ways of realization
2. How realization of the four stages of yoga takes place and the specific elucidation of each of the four yoga stages of Mahāmudrā

The text finishes with a detailed presentation of the four yogas of mahamudra, 1) one-pointedness, 2) freedom from elaborations, 3) one-taste and 4) non-meditation, which were skillfully introduced earlier in the text, when Dakpo Tashi Namgyal provides detailed instructions on the blending of meditative absorption with postabsorption, and thereby begins to open up mahamudra practice to meaningfully embrace even the distracted states of mind, a special feature of advanced mahamudra practice.

Dakpo Tashi Namgyal also authored a condensed meditation guide focused exclusively on mahamudra practice, which was translated by Erik Pema Kunsang and published in 2001. In its introduction, Thrangu Rinpoche reiterates the view that, "it is important that the profound and ultimate instructions of Mahamudra and Dzogchen are made available," and then adds:

In particular the words of Dakpo Tashi Namgyal are unique in that they are adorned with plenty of pithy advice out of his personal experience. Therefore, practitioners are greatly benefitted by his instructions on how to remove hindrances and progress further. His methods for practicing Mahamudra, found in such books as "Moonbeams" and "Clarifying the Natural State," are preeminent. Of these, this book ("Clarifying the Natural State") is indispensable as it focuses exclusively on practice.

The oral instructions had been previously given by Thrangu Rinpoche over two years, in 1998 and 1999, and were also translated by Kunsang. They were published, in 2003, under the title, Crystal Clear: Practical Advice for Meditators. In the same year, potential contributions of these ancient teachings to the modern world were being posited by Cambridge educated Traleg Kyabgon Rinpoche, who writes:

I believe that Mahamudra meditation is a most congenial match for the contemporary world. This type of meditation is not founded on the moralistic, judgmental, punitive approaches modern people often associate with religion, nor does it emphasize a spiritual path involving extensive periods of discipline, self-denial, and self-abnegation…the Mahamudra approach to spirituality allows us to see things in a positive and open light. Even things that we might normally regard as bad and undesirable can be interpreted in a more uplifting way due to the expansiveness of the Mahamudra vision, allowing us to benefit from it spiritually.

== Legacy and the Rimé movement ==
Patrul Rinpoche was a notable proponent of the Rimé movement. In The Nyingma School of Tibetan Buddhism, Dudjom Rinpoche, summarizes its highest dzogchen practices by quoting not just traditional Nyingma sources, but also the forefathers of mahamudra, Saraha and Naropa, thereby acknowledging the fundamental harmony between the Nyingma and Kagyu mind teachings. He also expresses that he hopes his own concise presentations of these profound teachings will "somewhat benefit" those who pursue its subject-matter with open minds.

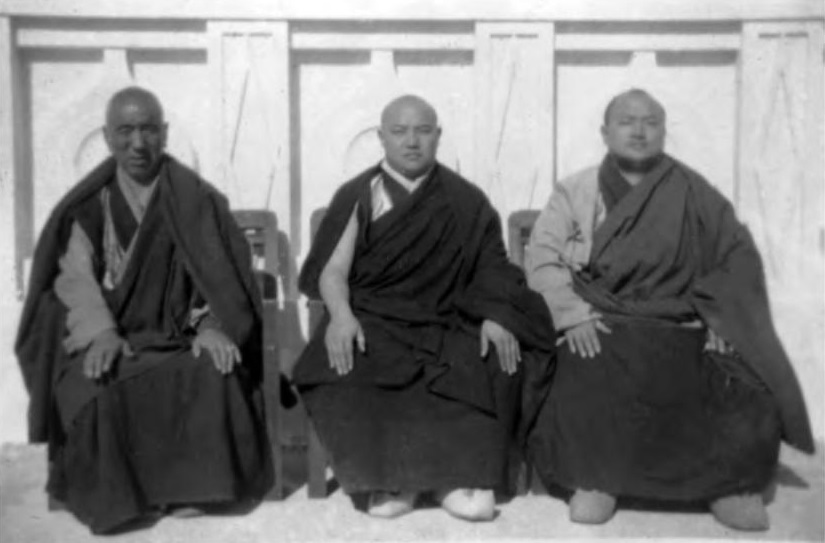
Khyentse Chokyi Lodro, the 16th Karmapa, and the 6th Dzogchen Ponlop at Bodh Gaya in 1956

The spirit of the Rimé was also embraced by the 16th Karmapa, Rangjung Rigpe Dorje, having been fostered by Khyentse Chökyi Lodrö, a mutual teacher of his and of Dudjom Rinpoche, and of a young Chagdud Tulku Rinpoche. Since the time of Khakyab Dorje, 15th Karmapa Lama (who had received all the Rimé transmissions from his teacher Jamgon Kongtrul), the leading Kagyu lamas have also embraced Rimé universalism and nonsectarianism.

Although the rise of Rimé is often associated with Jamyang Khyentse Wangpo and Jamgon Kongtrul – both born in the early 19th century, notable nonsectarian and universal compassion was already voiced by The Third Khamtrul Rinpoche, the author of an important mahamudra guide and a Drukpa lineage leader born in 1680, whose final words were:

I will rest in the nature of mind, within the inner mandala of Padmasambhava. Although I will enjoy the peace of nirvana, I cannot abandon suffering beings; so, even if each sentient being takes millions of years to be freed, I will emanate in many incarnations for them and for the Dharma. I have no wish to care only for my own tradition or just for those who respect me and are attached to me—I wish to be helpful to all beings without discrimination.

The legacy of the wishes of Tibetan Buddhist religious leaders and their adherents, after being forced to leave their homelands, is apparent in the second half of the 20th century and in the early 21st, through the collective presentations and publications of translations of these sacred texts, along with their associated oral instructions. Taken together, they represent a major milestone towards ensuring the preservation of the religious and cultural heritage of the mind teachings of Tibet – an effort which some may regard to be reminiscent of their original introduction to the lands of Tibet, more than thirteen centuries earlier.
