= Peter Welch =

American lawyer and politician (born 1947)

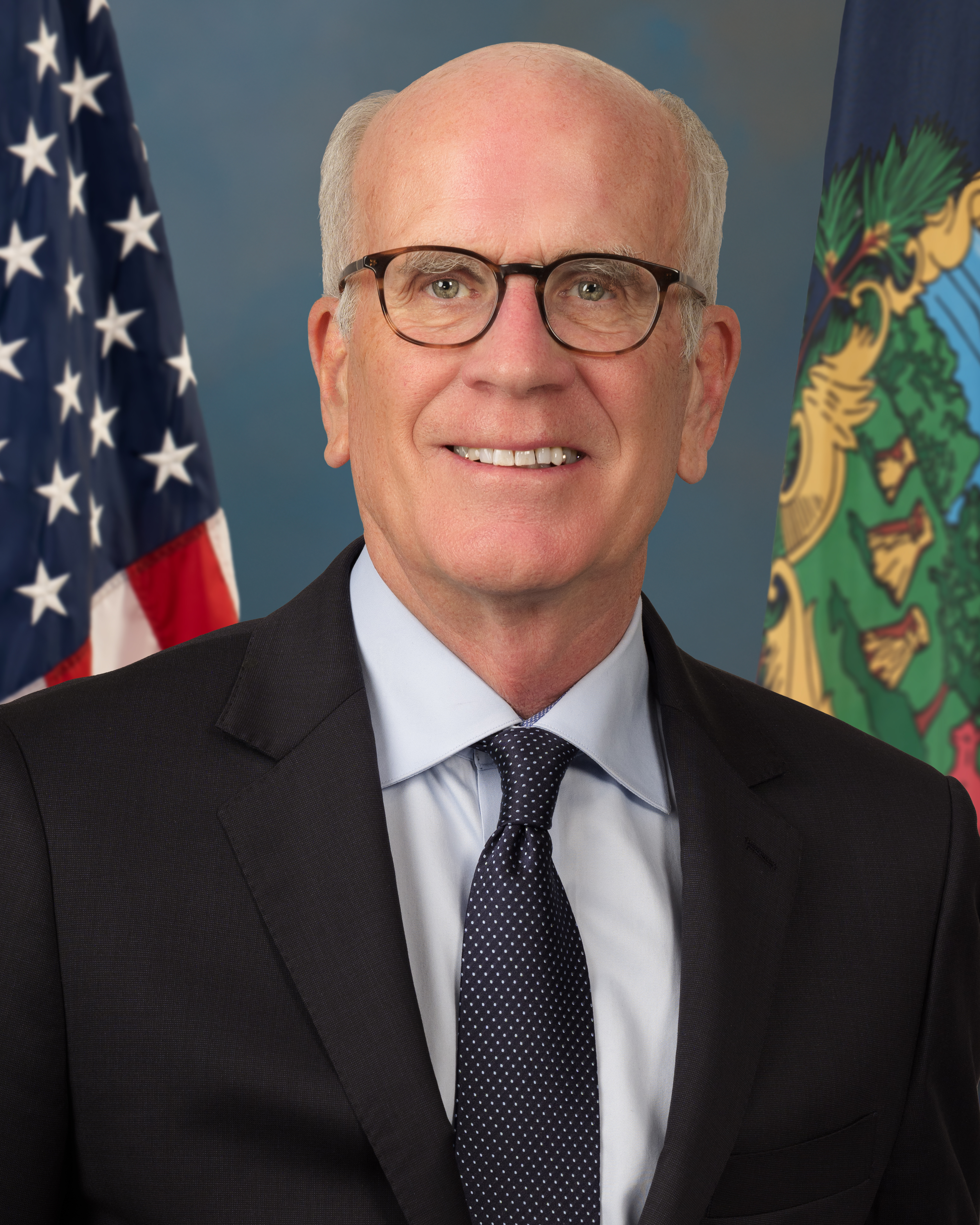
- Official portrait, 2022

United States Senator from Vermont
- Incumbent
- Assumed office January 3, 2023 Serving with Bernie Sanders
- Preceded by: Patrick Leahy

Member of the U.S. House of Representatives from Vermont's at-large district
- In office January 3, 2007 – January 3, 2023
- Preceded by: Bernie Sanders
- Succeeded by: Becca Balint

73rd and 78th President pro tempore of the Vermont Senate
- In office January 8, 2003 – January 3, 2007
- Preceded by: Peter Shumlin
- Succeeded by: Peter Shumlin
- In office January 9, 1985 – January 4, 1989
- Preceded by: Robert A. Bloomer
- Succeeded by: Doug Racine

Minority Leader of the Vermont Senate
- In office January 5, 1983 – January 8, 1985
- Preceded by: Robert Daniels
- Succeeded by: Allen Avery

Member of the Vermont Senate from the Windsor district
- In office December 13, 2001 – January 3, 2007 Serving with John Campbell, Richard McCormack
- Preceded by: Cheryl Rivers
- Succeeded by: Alice Nitka
- In office January 7, 1981 – January 4, 1989 Serving with Chester Scott, John Hudson Howland, Edgar May, William Hunter
- Preceded by: Herbert Ogden
- Succeeded by: Richard McCormack

Personal details
- Born: Peter Francis Welch; May 2, 1947 (age 79) Springfield, Massachusetts, U.S.
- Party: Democratic
- Spouses: Joan Smith (m. 1986; died 2004); Margaret Cheney (m. 2009)
- Education: College of the Holy Cross (BA); University of California, Berkeley (JD)
- Website: Senate website Campaign website
- Welch's voice Welch questioning witnesses for further clarity on USDA organic rules. Recorded February 1, 2023

Peter Francis Welch (born May 2, 1947) is an American lawyer and politician serving since 2023 as the junior United States senator from Vermont. A member of the Democratic Party, he was the U.S. representative for Vermont's at-large congressional district from 2007 to 2023. He has been a major figure in Vermont politics for over four decades and is only the second Democrat to represent Vermont in the Senate, after his predecessor, Patrick Leahy.

Born in Springfield, Massachusetts, Welch graduated from the College of the Holy Cross and the University of California, Berkeley, School of Law. He practiced law for several decades, first as a public defender and then as a personal injury lawyer in a law practice he founded. He was a member of the Vermont Senate from 1981 to 1989, including terms as minority leader, then was the Senate's president pro tempore from 1985 to 1989, the first Democrat to hold the position. In 1988, Welch gave up his seat to run for the United States House of Representatives and lost the Democratic primary to Paul N. Poirier. He was the Democratic nominee for governor of Vermont in 1990, losing the general election to Republican Richard A. Snelling.

Welch continued to practice law and returned to politics in 2001, when he was appointed to fill a vacancy in the Vermont Senate. He was reelected in 2002 and 2004 and was Senate president from 2003 to 2007. In 2006, Welch was elected to the U.S. House of Representatives, succeeding Bernie Sanders, who was elected to the United States Senate. In November 2021, Welch announced his candidacy for the Democratic nomination in the 2022 United States Senate election in Vermont to succeed retiring senator Patrick Leahy. On August 9, 2022, he won the Democratic primary. On November 8, 2022, Welch won the general election, defeating Republican nominee Gerald Malloy. Elected at age 75, he is the oldest person to win election to a first term as U.S. senator, a record previously held by Frederick H. Gillett.

== Early life and career ==
Peter Francis Welch was born on May 2, 1947, in Springfield, Massachusetts, to Edward and Mary Welch. His father was a dentist and his mother was a homemaker. He attended Cathedral High School (now Pope Francis Preparatory School). In 1969, he graduated from the College of the Holy Cross with a Bachelor of Arts (B.A.), magna cum laude, in history. Welch spent a year in Chicago as a fellow at the Robert F. Kennedy Center for Justice and Human Rights, then enrolled in the University of California, Berkeley, School of Law, earning his Juris Doctor (J.D.) in 1973.

Welch "worked with low-income people on Chicago's West Side in the late 1960s" as a community organizer. He worked for an organization that was affiliated with the Southern Christian Leadership Conference, and its activities included attendance at an SCLC national convention in Atlanta. Participants there strategized and heard remarks from Ralph Abernathy, Hosea Williams, and Martin Luther King Jr.

Welch worked for Lloyd Cutler, who later was White House Counsel during the administrations of presidents Jimmy Carter and Bill Clinton, at a Washington law firm.

After graduating from law school, Welch moved to Vermont in 1973. He was a law clerk for Judge Henry Black of the Vermont Superior Court. He worked for several years as a public defender for low-income clients in Windsor County and Orange County. Welch was a partner for 30 years in the personal injury law firm Welch, Graham & Manby in White River Junction, Vermont.

== Vermont government ==
In 1980, Welch was elected to the Vermont Senate from Windsor County. In his second term, Welch was chosen as the Minority Leader, and he became president pro tempore after Democrats gained control of the Senate. Welch was the first Democrat to be Vermont's senate president, since Vermont was a bastion for the Whigs and then the Republicans for more than 100 years beginning in the 1830s.

In 1988, Welch left the Vermont Senate to make an unsuccessful run for the Democratic nomination for the U.S. House of Representatives.

In 1990, Welch won the Democratic nomination for governor of Vermont but lost the general election to Republican Richard Snelling.

Welch did not run for another office for more than a decade; in 2001, Governor Howard Dean appointed him to fill a vacant Vermont Senate seat in Windsor County. He was elected to the seat in 2002 and reelected in 2004, and again was president pro tempore.

== U.S. House of Representatives ==
=== Elections ===
==== 2006 ====
When Vermont's U.S. Representative, Bernie Sanders, ran for the U.S. Senate in 2006, Welch chose to run for Sanders's seat. He defeated Republican Martha Rainville in the general election, 53% to 45%, in a race where both candidates pledged to be entirely positive. Welch was the first Democrat to represent Vermont in the House since 1961, and only the second since 1853 (though Sanders, an independent, caucused with the Democrats).

==== 2008 ====
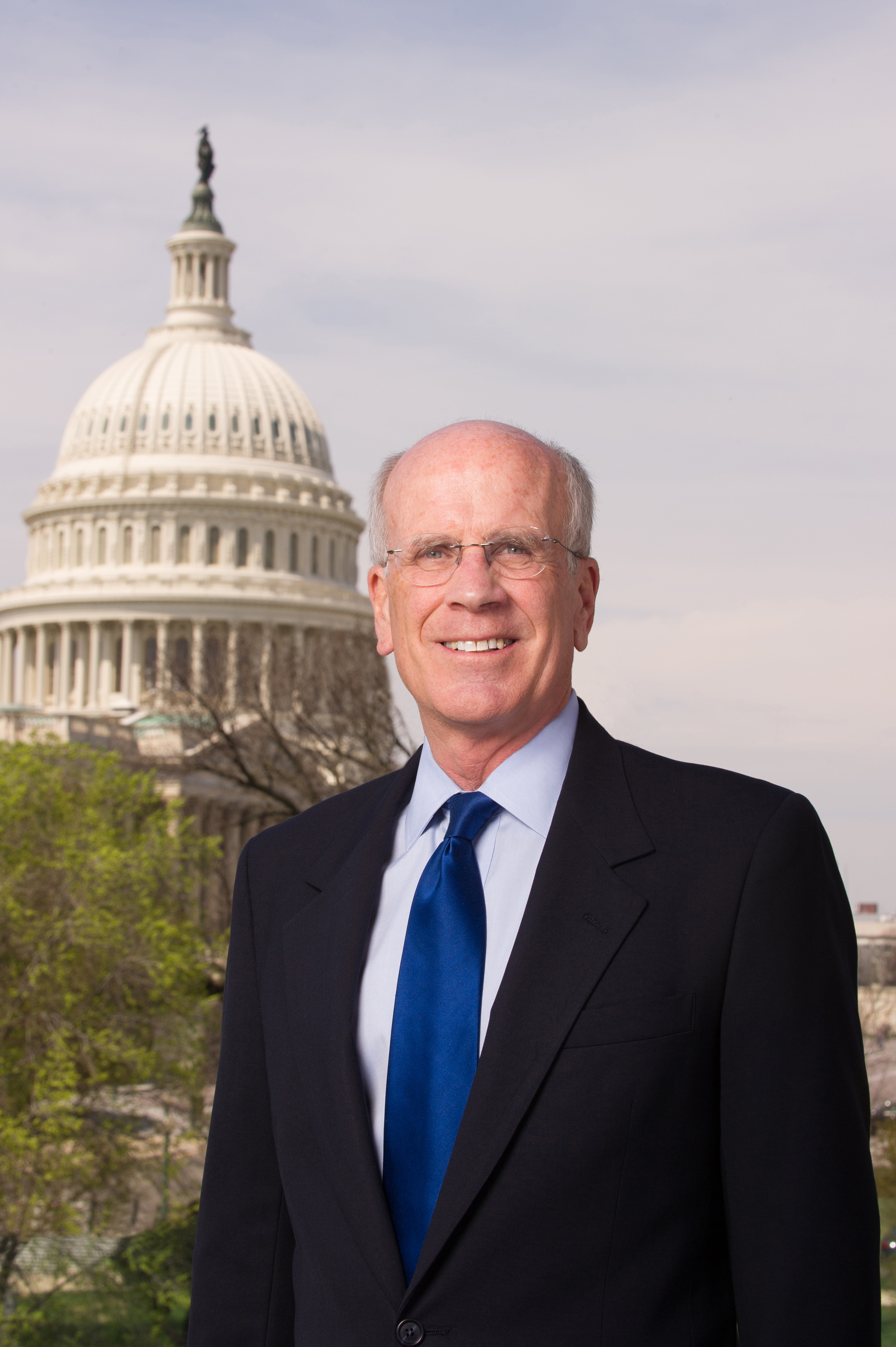
Welch during the 113th Congress

Welch was reelected with no major-party opposition, becoming the first Democrat to be reelected to the House from Vermont since 1848. He was in the unusual position of being both the Democratic and Republican nominee for the seat, due to Republican voters writing his name in on the blank primary ballot.

==== 2010 ====
Welch was reelected with 64% of the vote against Republican nominee Paul Beaudry, Liberty Union nominee Jane Newton, Working Families nominee Sheila Coniff, and independent candidate Gus Jaccaci.

==== 2012 ====
Welch defeated Republican nominee Mark Donka, Liberty Union candidate Jane Newton, and Independent candidates James "Sam" Desrochers and Andre LaFramboise with 72% of the vote.

==== 2014 ====
Welch was reelected to a fifth term with 64.4% of the vote, defeating Republican Mark Donka, Matthew Andrews of the Liberty Union Party and Independents Cris Ericson, Randall Meyer and Jerry Trudell.

==== 2016 ====
Welch ran unopposed in the Democratic primary, and also got more votes in the Republican primary than any other candidate, with 4.51% via write-ins. He defeated Liberty Union candidate Erica Clawson in the general election with 90% of the vote to Clawson's 10%.

==== 2018 ====
Welch was reelected to a seventh term with 69.2% of the vote, defeating Republican nominee Anya Tyino, Cris Ericson of the Marijuana Party, and Laura Potter of the Liberty Union Party.

==== 2020 ====
Welch was reelected to an eighth term with 67.3% of the vote, defeating Republican nominee Miriam Berry and Independent candidate Peter Becker.

=== Tenure ===
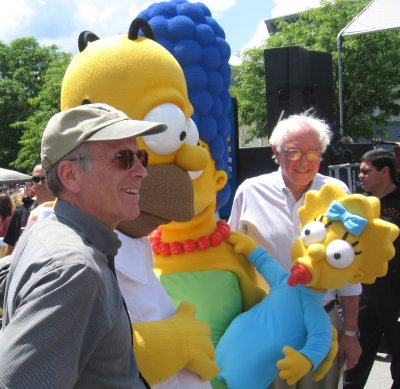
Welch and U.S. Senator Bernie Sanders at the premiere of The Simpsons Movie in 2007

One area where Welch was at odds with vocal constituents was the matter of the impeachment of President George W. Bush and Vice President Dick Cheney. Welch said that ending the Iraq War was a top priority, and impeachment would distract Congress from addressing that outcome. Advocates of impeachment protested at Welch's Vermont offices.

Welch worked with former House Majority Leader Eric Cantor on a bill to increase funding at the National Institutes of Health for pediatric research and with Representative Paul Ryan to reverse proposed regulations that would have banned the use of wooden shelves for ageing cheese wheels. He touts his bipartisanship and describes himself as "very independent". He bucked his party leadership by voting against arming and training Syrian rebels and opposes "boots on the ground" in dealing with ISIL. He believes climate change is a "glaring problem", opposed travel bans in response to the Ebola epidemic and supports immigration reform that addresses border concerns but does not close them.

In his first term, Welch attracted attention for his partnership with Senator Chuck Grassley in challenging colleges and universities with substantial endowments to spend more of those funds on operating expenses (including, perhaps, lower tuition).

On February 19, 2016, Welch endorsed Bernie Sanders for the Democratic nomination for president. He endorsed him again in 2020.

During the first impeachment of Donald Trump, Welch invited Trump to testify before the House Permanent Select Committee on Intelligence in response to Jim Jordan's criticism of the impeachment. Welch spoke directly after Jordan, saying, "I say to my colleague, I'd be glad to have the person who started it all come in and testify", adding, "President Trump is welcome to take a seat right there." On December 18, 2019, Welch voted for both articles of impeachment against Trump.

=== Committee assignments ===
In the 110th Congress, Welch was a member of the Committee on Rules and the Committee on Oversight and Government Reform.

In the 111th Congress, Welch was on the Committee on Energy and Commerce, the Committee on Oversight and Government Reform, and the Committee on Standards of Official Conduct.

In the 112th Congress, Welch was a member of the Committee on Agriculture and the Committee on Oversight and Government Reform. Beginning with the 112th Congress, he also was a Chief Deputy Whip, one of several who are part of Democratic Whip Steny Hoyer's organization for managing legislation and votes on the House floor.

During the 113th, 114th, 115th, 116th, and 117th Congresses, Welch was a member of the House Committee on Oversight and Government Reform and the House Committee on Energy and Commerce.

- Committee on Energy and Commerce
  - Subcommittee on Energy and Power
  - Subcommittee on Digital Commerce and Consumer Protection
  - Subcommittee on Communications and Technology
- Permanent Select Committee on Intelligence
  - Subcommittee on Counterterrorism, Counterintelligence and Counterproliferation
  - Subcommittee on Defense Intelligence and Warfighter Support
- Committee on Oversight and Government Reform
  - Subcommittee on National Security

=== Caucus memberships ===
- Climate Solutions Caucus
- Congressional Arts Caucus
- Congressional Biomass Caucus (co-chair)
- Congressional Dairy Farmers Caucus (co-chair and founder)
- Congressional NextGen 9-1-1 Caucus
- Congressional Progressive Caucus
- Medicare for All Caucus
- Congressional Telehealth Caucus (co-chair and co-founder)
- Safe Climate Caucus

== U.S. Senate ==
=== Elections ===
==== 2022 ====
On November 15, 2021, incumbent Patrick Leahy announced that he would not seek reelection in the 2022 U.S. Senate election. Welch was considered a possible contender for the seat. On November 22, Welch announced his candidacy to succeed Leahy. He won the Democratic primary by a large margin, and defeated Republican nominee Gerald Malloy in the general election.

=== Committee assignments ===
- Committee on Agriculture, Nutrition, and Forestry
  - Subcommittee on Rural Development and Energy (ranking member)
  - Subcommittee on Conservation, Forestry, Natural Resources, and Biotechnology
  - Subcommittee on Livestock, Dairy, Poultry, and Food Safety
- Committee on the Judiciary
  - Subcommittee on The Constitution (ranking member)
  - Subcommittee on Antitrust, Competition Policy and Consumer Rights
  - Subcommittee on Federal Courts, Oversight, Agency Action and Federal Rights
  - Subcommittee on Intellectual Property
- Committee on Rules and Administration
- Committee on Finance
  - Subcommittee on Energy, Natural Resources, and Infrastructure
  - Subcommittee on Health Care

=== Caucus memberships ===
- Senate Democratic Caucus
- Electrification Caucus
- Senate Renewable Energy and Energy Efficiency Caucus

== Political positions ==
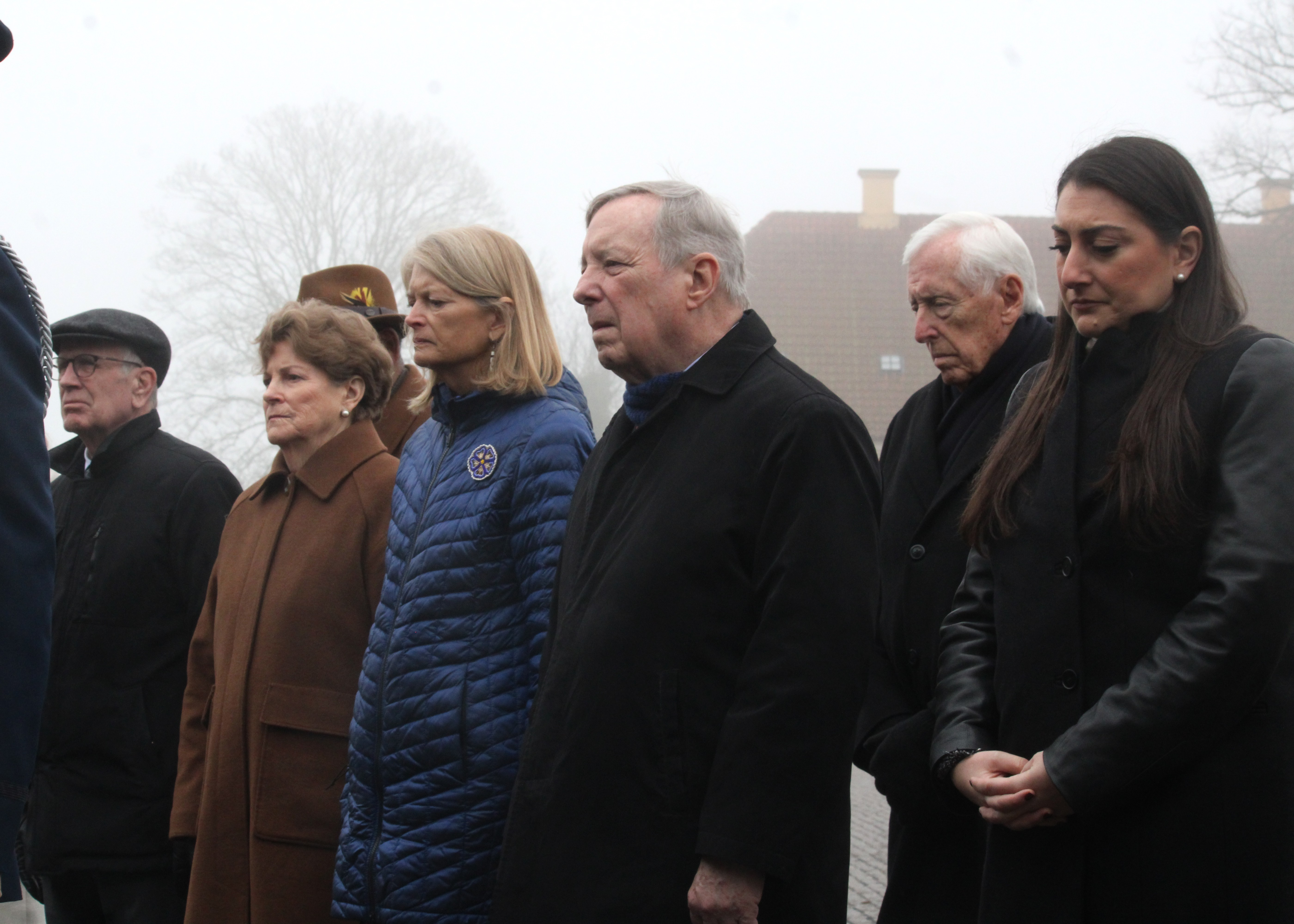
Welch (far left) at Kastellet in Copenhagen, Denmark in support of the country during the Greenland crisis, January 2026

=== Gun control ===
Welch participated in the 2016 United States House of Representatives sit-in to support gun control.

Welch supports a national assault weapons ban.

=== LGBT rights ===
Welch supports transgender rights and gender-affirming medical care and counseling for transgender and nonbinary adults and adolescents.

=== Israel and Palestine ===
On November 26, 2023, Welch called for an indefinite ceasefire in the Gaza war. He was the third U.S. senator, the second member of Vermont's congressional delegation, and the first senator from Vermont to do so.

In January 2024, Welch voted for a resolution proposed by Senator Bernie Sanders to apply the human rights provisions of the Foreign Assistance Act to U.S. aid to Israel's military. The proposal was defeated, 72 to 11. In April 2025, Welch voted for a pair of resolutions Sanders proposed to cancel the Trump administration's sales of $8.8 billion in bombs and other munitions to Israel. The proposals were defeated, 82 to 15.

=== President Biden's reelection campaign ===
Welch was the first Democratic senator to call on Joe Biden to withdraw from the 2024 United States presidential election. On July 10, 2024, The Washington Post published Welch's op-ed in which he said that President Biden should drop out for the "good of the country".

=== Social media and cybersecurity ===
In January 2025, Welch co-sponsored the Kids Off Social Media Act (KOSMA), which was introduced by Senators Brian Schatz, Chris Murphy, Ted Cruz, and Katie Britt. The Act was also co-sponsored by Senators Ted Budd, Mark Warner, John Curtis, Angus King, and John Fetterman. It would set a minimum age of 13 to use social media platforms and prevent social media companies from feeding "algorithmically targeted" content to users under age 17.

=== Abortion rights ===
Welch supports reproductive rights, abortion rights, and access to birth control. He supports federal nationwide legislation to make abortion legal. He also supports Roe v. Wade. After it was overturned, Welch said: "Our U.S. Supreme Court has totally failed us. In the name of 'state rights,' they have taken away freedom and caused distress and uncertainty for women across the country. It's outrageous that because of this Court and this decision, women have fewer reproductive rights than they did fifty years ago. The choice to have an abortion is deeply personal and now, in many states, it's in the hands of judges and legislators". He continued, "Women deserve to know their reproductive health care and access to abortion won't change when they cross state lines—they need consistent, federal standards and protections. I'm continuing to call on Congress to pass legislation that will restore, protect and expand access to abortion and reproductive care nationwide".

=== Health ===
Welch introduced the Whole Milk for Healthy Kids Act of 2025 to require school cafeterias to offer whole milk as well as 2% milk. President Donald Trump signed the bill into law on January 15, 2026, at an event at the White House, which Welch attended.

== Personal life ==
Since 2009, Welch has been married to Margaret Cheney, a former member of the Vermont House of Representatives who was appointed to the Vermont Public Service Board in 2013. He was married to Joan Smith from 1986 until she died of cancer in 2004. Welch has five stepchildren from his first marriage and three from his second.

== Electoral history ==
Vermont Senate
Preceded by Robert Daniels	Minority Leader of the Vermont Senate; 1983–1985	Succeeded by Allen Avery
Preceded by Robert A. Bloomer	President pro tempore of the Vermont Senate; 1985–1989	Succeeded by Doug Racine
Preceded by Peter Shumlin	President pro tempore of the Vermont Senate; 2003–2007	Succeeded by Peter Shumlin
Party political offices
Preceded by Madeleine Kunin	Democratic nominee for Governor of Vermont; 1990	Succeeded by Howard Dean
Preceded by Patrick Leahy	Democratic nominee for U.S. Senator from Vermont (Class 3); 2022	Most recent
U.S. House of Representatives
Preceded by Bernie Sanders	Member of the U.S. House of Representatives from Vermont's at-large congressional district 2007–2023	Succeeded by Becca Balint
U.S. Senate
Preceded by Patrick Leahy	U.S. Senator (Class 3) from Vermont; 2023–present Served alongside: Bernie Sanders	Most recent
U.S. order of precedence (ceremonial)
Preceded by Ted Budd	Order of precedence of the United States as United States Senator	Succeeded by Katie Britt
Preceded by Raphael Warnock	United States senators by seniority 79th	Succeeded by Ted Budd
