= Wayne H. Page =

United States Army Brigadier General

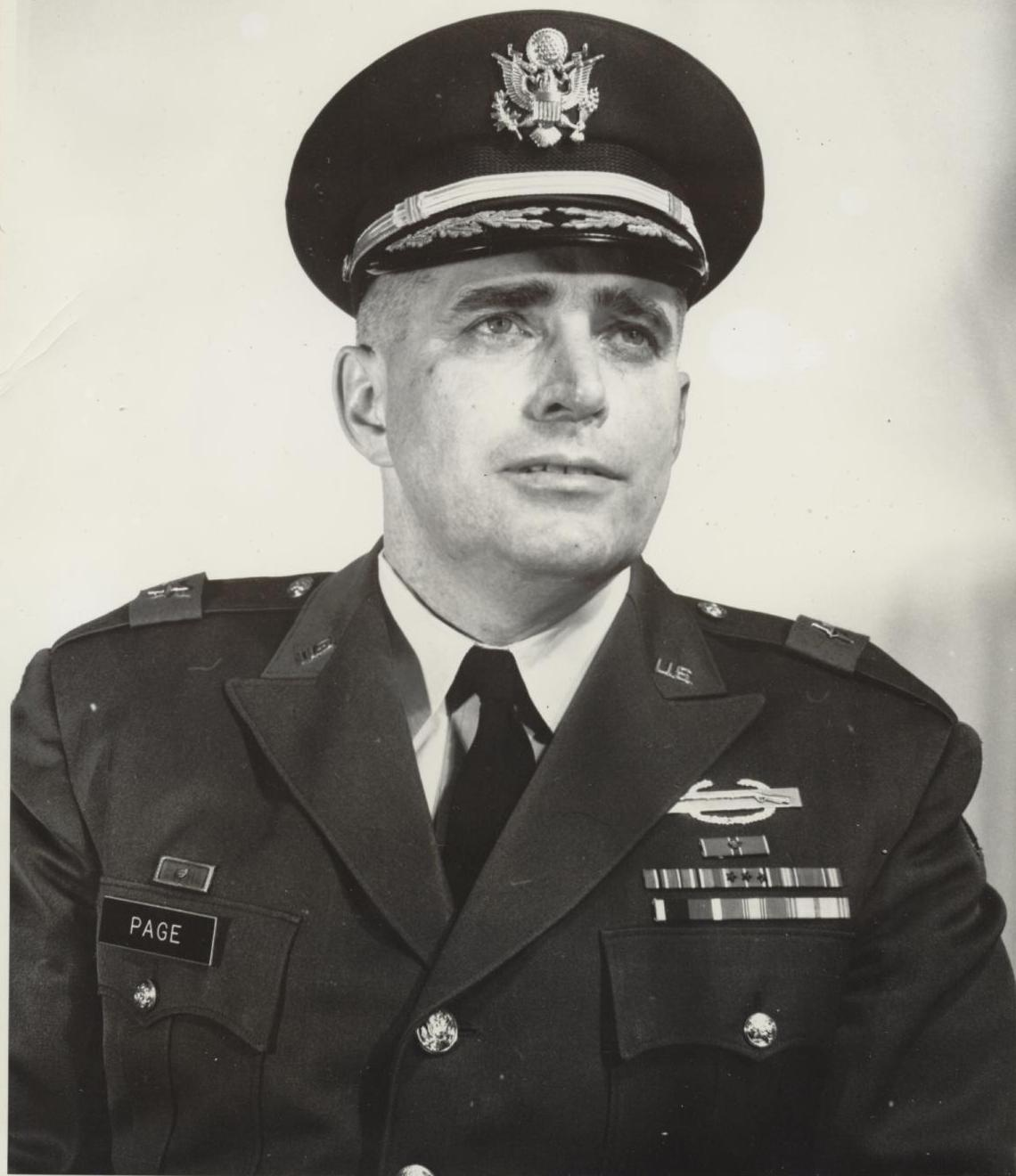
- Wayne H. Page, Adjutant General of the Vermont National Guard, 1966–1967.
- Born: September 25, 1922; Hyde Park, Vermont
- Died: March 26, 2001 (aged 78) Burlington, Vermont
- Buried: Hooper Cemetery; Hyde Park, Vermont
- Allegiance: Vermont; United States
- Branch: Vermont National Guard; United States Army
- Service years: 1942 – 1967
- Rank: Brigadier General
- Commands: 86th Armored Brigade; Vermont National Guard
- Conflicts: World War II; Korean War
- Awards: Bronze Star Medal (2); Combat Infantryman Badge
- Other work: Mining Engineer, Manager, Executive, GAF Materials Corporation

Wayne Harold Page (September 25, 1922 – March 26, 2001) was a Vermont military officer and business executive who served as Adjutant General of the Vermont National Guard.

== Early life ==
Wayne H. Page was born in Hyde Park, Vermont on September 25, 1922. He was educated in Hyde Park, and graduated from the University of Vermont with a degree in electrical engineering in 1943.

== World War II ==
Page joined the United States Army for World War II, enlisting in 1943 and receiving his commission after completion of Officer Candidate School in 1944. He served in Europe as a member of the 398th Infantry Regiment, 100th Infantry Division and attained the rank of captain before being discharged in 1946.

== Post-World War II ==
After the war, Page became a mining engineer, manager and executive with the Ruberoid Corporation, responsible for overseeing operations at an asbestos mine in Belvidere, Vermont.

He was also active in politics, including serving as Chairman of the Lamoille County Republican Committee.

He also maintained his affiliation with the military as a member of the Vermont Army National Guard.

He was activated for the Korean War as a member of the 43rd Division, but was released before the division deployed to West Germany, acceding to a Department of Defense request to return to his civilian job, which was regarded as more important to the war effort.

By the mid-1960s, Page had attained the rank of brigadier general as commander of the 86th Armored Brigade and then Vermont's Assistant Adjutant General for Army.

== Adjutant General ==
In September 1966 Adjutant General Francis William Billado died. From September until December of that year his deputy, Reginald M. Cram acted as Adjutant General.

In November, Page announced that he would be a candidate for the position during the election scheduled for February, 1967. (Since the 1860s the Adjutant General is selected for a two-year term by the Vermont General Assembly. At the time, elections were held in February of each odd-numbered year, and terms began the following March. The Governor of Vermont can make a temporary appointment to fill a vacancy if it occurs when the legislature is not in session.)

On November 30, 1966, Governor Philip H. Hoff appointed Page to serve as Adjutant General until the new term began in March, 1967. Though both Cram and Page were Republicans and Hoff a Democrat, Hoff indicated that he made the decision to appoint Page after other Vermont National Guard officers expressed to him their preference for an Army officer (Page) over one from the Air Force (Cram), given that most Vermont National Guard units were Army organizations.

After Page's appointment, Cram resigned as Deputy Adjutant General and campaigned for a full two-year term. In an upset, Cram defeated Page in the election, ending Page's three-month tenure as Adjutant General. (Cram served until he retired in 1981.)

Page served again briefly as Assistant Adjutant General for Army after losing the election, and retired from the military in mid-1967. He continued his career with the Ruberoid Corporation, which later became part of GAF Materials Corporation, accepting positions outside Vermont and rising to vice president and member of the board of directors.

== Retirement and death ==
Page continued to live in Lamoille County after retiring in the late 1980s. He was a member of the Veterans of Foreign Wars, the American Legion, and numerous other civic, professional and fraternal organizations. In addition, he was an active volunteer at Morristown's Centennial Library. He died in Burlington, Vermont on March 26, 2001, and was buried in Hyde Park's Hooper Cemetery.

== Awards ==
Page's awards included the Bronze Star Medal (2) and the Combat Infantryman Badge.

== Family ==
In 1942 Page married Sylvia F. Ward (March 22, 1923 – June 25, 1999). They had three children: Chandler S. who died in 1963, Karen Hoke of Allentown, Pennsylvania and Nancy Zaphiris of Arlington, Massachusetts.

Military offices
Preceded by Reginald M. Cram	Vermont Adjutant General; December, 1966 – March, 1967	Succeeded by Reginald M. Cram
