= Camp Johnson (Vermont) =

Vermont Army National Guard installation

- Colchester, Vermont in United States

Site information
- Owner: Department of Defense
- Operator: Vermont National Guard
- Controlled by: Vermont National Guard
- Open to the public: Yes

Location
- Coordinates: 44.49998°N 73.16489°W
- Area: 660 acres (1.03 sq mi)

Site history
- Built by: US Army Corps of Engineers

Garrison information
- Current commander: Major General Gregory Knight

Camp Johnson is a installation of the United States Department of Defense in Colchester, Vermont. It houses the Headquarters of the Vermont Army National Guard.

== History ==
Fort Ethan Allen was purchased by the Vermont General Assembly for use as a training site in 1894. In 1898 the 1st Vermont Volunteer Infantry (see 172nd Cavalry Regiment) was stationed there for the Spanish–American War. In 1900 the Vermont National Guard took possession. The site was then renamed to Camp Olympia. It was later named for successive Governors and used for unit training and a staging area for mobilization. In 1945 the State Reservation permanently renamed Camp Olympia to Camp Johnson to honor Herbert T. Johnson, the general who led Vermont's military during and between the world wars.

The Vermont National Guard Museum and Library is located on Camp Johnson and focuses on the military history of Vermont.
