= 2006 United States House of Representatives election in Vermont =

2006 United States House of Representatives election in Vermont's at-large district
- November 7, 2006
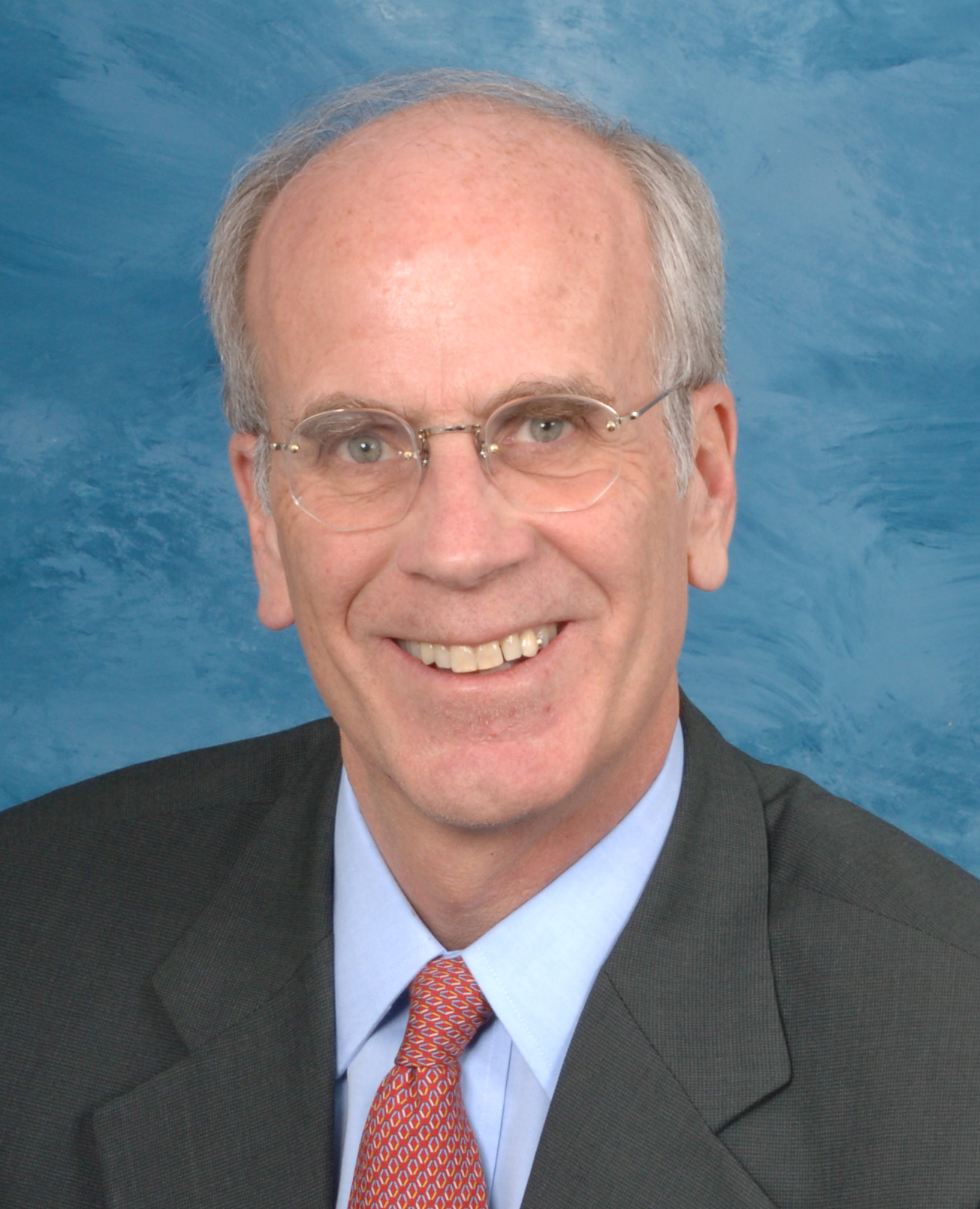

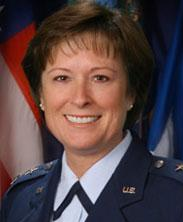
Nominee	Peter Welch	Martha Rainville
Party	Democratic	Republican
Popular vote	139,815	117,023
Percentage	53.22%	44.54%
- Welch: 40–50% 50–60% 60–70% 70–80% 80–90% Rainville: 40–50% 50–60% 60–70% 70–80% Trudell: 50–60%
U.S. Representative before election
Bernie Sanders
Independent
Elected U.S. Representative
Peter Welch
Democratic

The 2006 United States House of Representatives election in Vermont was held on November 7, 2006, for representation of Vermont's at-large congressional district in the United States House of Representatives from January 3, 2007, to January 3, 2009.

Incumbent Congressman Bernie Sanders, an independent member of Congress who caucused with the Democrats, did not seek a ninth term in the House, instead running successfully for the United States Senate.

To replace Congressman Sanders, Democrat Peter Welch defeated Republican Martha Rainville by a somewhat narrow margin (just under 10%) in staunchly-liberal Vermont. As of 2022, this is the last federal election in which a Republican received more than a third of the vote.

== Democratic primary ==
=== Candidates ===
- Peter Welch, state senate president pro tempore, nominee for Governor in 1990, and candidate for this seat in 1988

=== Results ===
Democratic primary results
Party	Candidate	Votes	%
Democratic	Peter Welch	34,706	97.11
Democratic	Write-ins	1,033	2.89
Total votes		35,739	100.00

== Republican primary ==
=== Candidates ===
- Martha Rainville, former Vermont National Guard adjutant general
- Mark Shepard, state senator

=== Results ===
Republican primary results
Party	Candidate	Votes	%
Republican	Martha Rainville	26,199	71.31
Republican	Mark Shepard	10,285	27.99
Republican	Write-ins	258	0.70
Total votes		36,742	100.00

== Third-party and independent candidates ==
=== Declined ===
- David Zuckerman, member of the Vermont House of Representatives, farmer, businessman, environmentalist (Progressive Party)

== General election ==
=== Polling ===
Source	Date	Peter Welch (D)	Martha Rainville (R)	Jane Newton (LU)
Research 2000	October 23–24, 2006	51%	41%	
Greenburg Quinlan	October 8–9, 2006	52%	41%	
Research 2000	September 18–19, 2006	45%	39%	
American Research Group	September 14, 2006	48%	45%	2%
American Research Group	July 27, 2006	41%	42%	

=== Predictions ===
Source	Ranking	As of
The Cook Political Report	Lean D (flip)	November 6, 2006
Rothenberg	Likely D (flip)	November 6, 2006
Sabato's Crystal Ball	Likely D (flip)	November 6, 2006
Real Clear Politics	Lean D (flip)	November 7, 2006
CQ Politics	Lean D (flip)	November 7, 2006

=== Results ===
County flips: Democratic Flip / Republican Flip

Vermont's at-large congressional district election, 2006
Party	Candidate	Votes	%
Democratic	Peter Welch	139,815	53.22%
Republican	Martha Rainville	117,023	44.54%
Independent	Dennis Morrisseau	1,390	0.53%
Independent	Jerry Trudell	1,013	0.39%
Green	Bruce R. Marshall	994	0.38%
Independent	Keith Stern	963	0.37%
Liberty Union	Jane Newton	721	0.27%
Independent	Chris Karr	599	0.23%
Write-ins		208	0.08%
Total votes		262,726	100.00
Democratic gain from Independent			

==== By county ====
County	Peter Welch Democratic		Martha Rainville Republican		All others		Margin		Total votes cast
County	#	%	#	%	#	%	#	%	Total votes cast
Addison	8,784	53.7%	7,252	44.4%	313	2.0%	1,532	9.3%	16,349
Bennington	7,915	55.3%	5,412	37.8%	997	6.0%	2,503	17.5%	14,324
Caledonia	5,400	44.3%	6,502	53.4%	275	2.2%	-1,102	-9.1%	12,177
Chittenden	36,965	55.7%	28,630	43.1%	800	1.3%	8,335	12.6%	66,395
Essex	970	38.2%	1,466	57.8%	100	3.9%	-496	-19.6%	2,536
Franklin	7,388	41.9%	10,018	56.9%	210	1.2%	-2,630	-15.0%	17,616
Grand Isle	1,644	44.6%	2,005	54.4%	37	1.0%	-361	-9.8%	3,686
Lamoille	5,565	53.1%	4,726	45.1%	182	1.7%	839	8.0%	10,473
Orange	6,452	51.8%	5,767	46.3%	232	1.9%	685	5.5%	12,451
Orleans	4,665	44.9%	5,520	53.2%	200	1.9%	-855	-8.3%	10,385
Rutland	12,245	47.8%	12,847	50.2%	518	2.0%	-602	-2.4%	25,610
Washington	15,223	55.8%	11,582	42.5%	462	1.7%	3,641	13.3%	27,267
Windham	11,778	63.6%	5,806	31.4%	922	5.0%	5,972	32.2%	18,506
Windsor	14,821	59.4%	9,490	38.0%	640	2.5%	5,331	21.4%	24,951
Totals	139,815	53.2%	117,023	44.5%	5,888	2.2%	22,792	8.7%	262,726

Counties that flipped from Independent to Democratic

- Addison (largest municipality: Middlebury)
- Bennington (largest municipality: Bennington)
- Chittenden (largest municipality: Burlington)
- Lamoille (largest municipality: Morristown)
- Orange (largest city: Randolph)
- Washington (largest municipality: Barre)
- Windham (largest municipality: Brattleboro)
- Windsor (largest municipality: Hartford)

Counties that flipped from Independent to Republican

- Rutland (largest municipality: Rutland)
- Grand Isle (largest municipality: Alburgh)
- Caledonia (largest municipality: St. Johnsbury)
- Orleans (largest municipality: Derby)
- Essex (largest city: Lunenburg)
- Franklin (largest city: St. Albans)

Preceded by 2004	U.S. House of Representatives elections (Vermont's at-large congressional district); 2006	Succeeded by 2008
