= Timothy Briglin =

American politician and member of the Vermont State House of Representatives

Member of the Vermont House of Representatives from the 2nd Windsor-Orange district
- Incumbent
- Assumed office January 7, 2015
- Preceded by: Kathy Hoyt

Personal details
- Born: Timothy Charles Briglin; April 7, 1966 (age 60) Greenwich, New York, U.S.
- Party: Democratic
- Spouse: Laurel Mackin
- Children: 2
- Education: Cornell University (BA); Stanford University (MBA)

Timothy Charles Briglin (born April 7, 1966) is an American politician who served in the Vermont House of Representatives from 2014 to 2022.

He retired at the 2022 Vermont House of Representatives election.
