= Margaret Cheney (politician) =

American politician (born 1952)

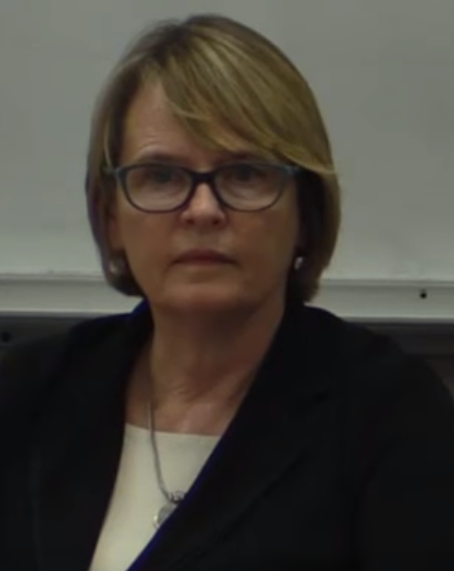

Member of the Vermont House of Representatives from the 2nd Windsor-Orange district
- In office January 3, 2007 – October 1, 2013 Serving with Jim Masland
- Preceded by: Ann Seibert
- Succeeded by: Kathy Hoyt

Personal details
- Born: August 1, 1952 (age 73) Hanover, New Hampshire, U.S.
- Party: Democratic
- Spouse: Peter Welch (m. 2009)
- Education: Harvard University (BA)

Margaret Rice Cheney (born August 1, 1952) is an American politician who served as a member of the Vermont House of Representatives from 2007 until her appointment to the Vermont Public Service Board in 2013. She was the managing editor of Washingtonian from 1978 to 1989, after which she moved to Norwich, Vermont. She is married to U.S. Senator Peter Welch.
