= Martha Rainville =

American politician

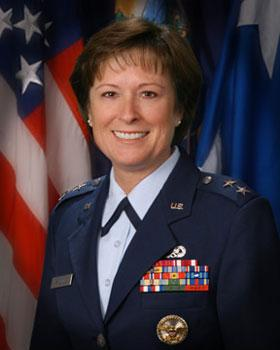
- Born: Martha Trim; April 9, 1958 (age 68); New London, Connecticut, U.S.
- Military career
- Allegiance: United States of America
- Branch: United States Air Force
- Service years: 1979–2006
- Rank: Major General
- Units: Air Force; New York Air National Guard; Air Force Reserve; Vermont Air National Guard
- Commands: 158th Aircraft Maintenance Squadron; Vermont National Guard
- Awards: Air Force Distinguished Service Medal; Legion of Merit; Meritorious Service Medal
- Other work: Counselor, Deputy Administrator, Assistant Administrator, Federal Emergency Management Agency

Martha T. Rainville (née Trim, born April 9, 1958) is a retired U.S. Air Force officer who attained the rank of major general. She was the first woman in U.S. history to become a state adjutant general when she served in that post with the Vermont National Guard.

In 2006 she ran as the Republican candidate for Vermont's at-large congressional district and was defeated by Democratic candidate Peter Welch. Rainville was later appointed to senior executive roles at FEMA, and then became Chief Operating Officer of Civil Support International LLC, a disaster preparedness and crisis response consulting firm.

== Early life and education ==
Rainville was born in New London, Connecticut while her father was serving in the United States Navy, and she was raised in Mississippi after her father's retirement. She graduated from Chamberlain-Hunt Academy in 1975, and received a Bachelor of Arts in Education from the University of Mississippi (1979).

== Military career ==
Following graduation, she entered the United States Air Force, and was a 1979 Distinguished Graduate of the United States Air Force Officer Basic Military Training Program at Lackland Air Force Base, Texas. She served on active duty from 1978 to 1984, then transferred to the New York Air National Guard. She also served in the Air Force Reserve before transferring to the Vermont Air National Guard. Rainville specialized in the planning and management of aircraft maintenance and advanced through the ranks to lieutenant colonel and commander of Vermont's 158th Aircraft Maintenance Squadron.

== Adjutant general ==
In February 1997, Rainville won the Vermont General Assembly's election for adjutant general of the State of Vermont. In most states the adjutant general is appointed by the governor; in Vermont the state legislature chooses. At the time, the election for a two-year term was held in February of each odd-numbered year, and the term started in March. Rainville became the first woman in U.S. history to serve as head of a state's National Guard, and commanded the 3,800 members of the Vermont Army and Air National Guard until her retirement in 2006.

Along with her work in Vermont, Rainville served on the Reserve Forces Policy Board, the executive committee of the Adjutant Generals Association of the United States, and was elected vice chair for Air of the National Guard Association of the United States board of directors.

== Effective dates of promotion ==
- Second Lieutenant, September 19, 1979
- First Lieutenant, September 19, 1981
- Captain, October 19, 1984
- Major, January 5, 1991
- Lieutenant Colonel, August 28, 1995
- Colonel, June 28, 1998
- Brigadier General, October 29, 1999
- Major General, March 30, 2001

== Military assignments ==
1. September 1979 - March 1980, student, 3353 School Squadron, Chanute Tactical Training Center, Ill.
2. March 1980 - September 1980, assistant officer-in-charge, 4756th Aircraft Generation Squadron, Tyndall Air Force Base, Fla.
3. September 1980 - November 1981, assistant maintenance supervisor, 325th Equipment Maintenance Squadron, Air Force Base, Fla
4. November 1981 - May 1982, unit logistics program officer, 49th Fighter Interceptor Squadron, Griffis Air Force Base, N.Y.
5. May 1982 - October 1982, officer-in-charge, Plans Program and Mobility, 49th Fighter Interceptor Squadron, Griffis Air Force Base, N.Y.
6. November 1982 - January 1984, officer-in-charge, Maintenance Control, 49th Fighter Interceptor Squadron, Griffis Air Force Base, N.Y.
7. January 1984 - July 1985, officer-in-charge, Avionics Branch, 174th Consolidated Aircraft Maintenance Squadron, New York Air National Guard, Syracuse, N.Y.
8. July 1985 - July 1987, education training safety officer, 934th Combat Support Squadron, United States Air Force Reserve, Minneapolis-St. Paul, Minn.
9. July 1987 - July 1988, unit plans officer, 934th Combat Support Squadron, United States Air Force Reserve, Minneapolis-St. Paul, Minn.
10. August 1988 - July 1991, aircraft maintenance officer, 158th Aircraft Maintenance Squadron, Vermont Air National Guard, Burlington, Vt.
11. July 1991 - February 1997, commander, 158th Aircraft Maintenance Squadron, Vermont Air National Guard, Burlington, Vt.
12. March 1997 - April 2006, adjutant general of Vermont, Camp Johnson, Colchester, Vt.

== Military education ==
- Squadron Officer School (Correspondence), 1988
- Air Command and Staff College (Correspondence), 1994
- Air War College (Correspondence), 1997

== Military awards ==
- Air Force Distinguished Service Medal
- Legion of Merit
- Meritorious Service Medal
- Air Force Commendation Medal with four oak leaf clusters
- Air Force Achievement Medal
- Air Force Outstanding Unit Award
- Air Force Organizational Excellence Award
- National Defense Service Medal
- Armed Forces Reserve Medal
- Air Force Longevity Service Award with silver oak leaf cluster
- Small Arms Expert Marksmanship Ribbon
- Air Force Training Ribbon
- Vermont National Guard Outstanding Unit Award
- Vermont National Guard Service Ribbon with 2 bronze service stars
- Vermont National Guard Duty Ribbon with 4 bronze service stars

== Campaign for Congress ==
In 2005, Rainville began consulting with members of the Republican and Democratic parties regarding a possible run for the U.S. House of Representatives or the U.S. Senate. She was courted by members of both parties and announced in the spring of 2006 that she would run for Vermont's U.S. House seat as a Republican, intending to base her campaign on government reform and ethics, homeland security, and a strong national defense. She won the Republican nomination with 71 percent of the primary vote, to 28 for Mark Shepard, a member of the Vermont Senate.

Rainville was the Republican nominee against Democrat Peter Welch for the seat Bernie Sanders was leaving to run for the U.S. Senate. She signed a Clean Campaign Pledge in which she vowed to not attack her opponent, and condemned negative TV ads by outside parties. Rainville's campaign, though a positive one, made some gaffes including an incident in which one of her staffers was found to have plagiarized portions of issue position statements posted to Rainville's campaign website, which resulted in a drop for Rainville in pre-election public opinion polls.

A strong national anti-Republican wave, based partially on dwindling support for the post-invasion Iraqi occupation, combined with a desire to restore Democrats to a Congressional oversight role of the George W. Bush administration, made winning the seat an uphill battle. On Election Day, Welch won the seat 53.2 percent to 44.5, with minor candidates splitting the rest of the vote.

== FEMA ==
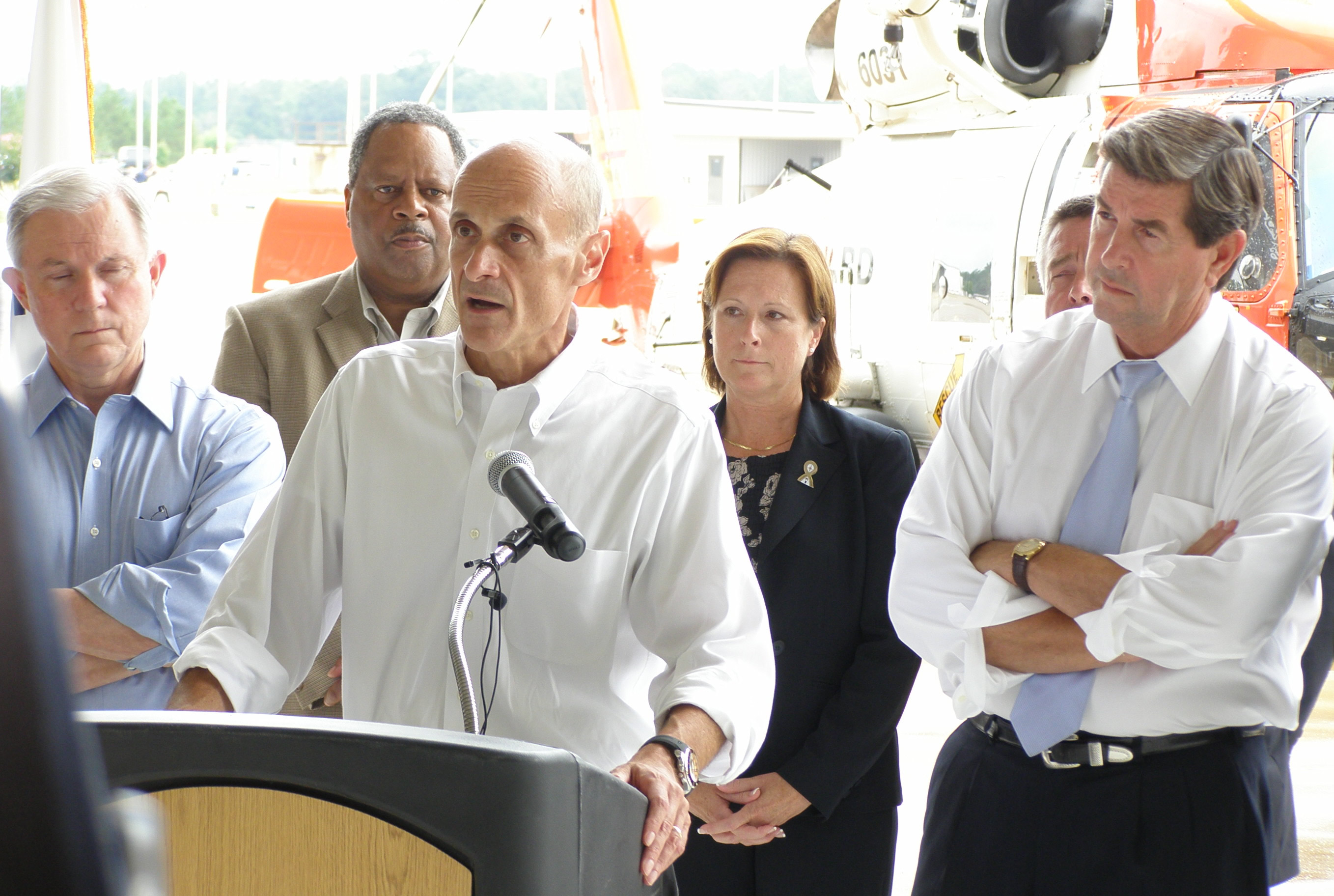
FEMA case studies specialist Rainville (center back) accompanies Secretary of Homeland Security Michael Chertoff in demonstration of U.S. Coast Guard Deployable Operations Group

In 2007, Rainville was appointed counselor to the Department of Homeland Security's Federal Emergency Management Agency (FEMA) administrator and deputy administrator for Continuity Programs. Rainville was responsible for ensuring that FEMA performed its role as Lead Agent for Federal Executive Branch Continuity Programs and served until 2009.

== Continued career ==
After leaving FEMA, Rainville worked in the private sector as President of Rainville & Associates, a consulting firm for corporations working to develop or expand their National Guard or homeland security-related activities. She later served as Chief Operating Officer of Civil Support International LLC, a disaster preparedness and crisis response consulting firm.

== Personal life ==
Rainville is the daughter of the late Nick and Lucille Trim of Port Gibson, Mississippi. She was married to Norman Rainville, whom she met while both served in the Air Force; they had three children and divorced in 2003. In 2009 she married Paul McHale, a former Democratic Congressman from Pennsylvania and former Assistant Secretary of Defense.

== See also ==
- List of female United States military generals and flag officers

Military offices
Preceded by Donald E. Edwards	Vermont Adjutant General; 1997–2006	Succeeded by Michael Dubie
Party political offices
Preceded by Greg Parke (2004)	Republican nominee for U.S. Representative from Vermont; 2006	Succeeded by None (2008)
