= Reginald M. Cram =

United States Air Force general

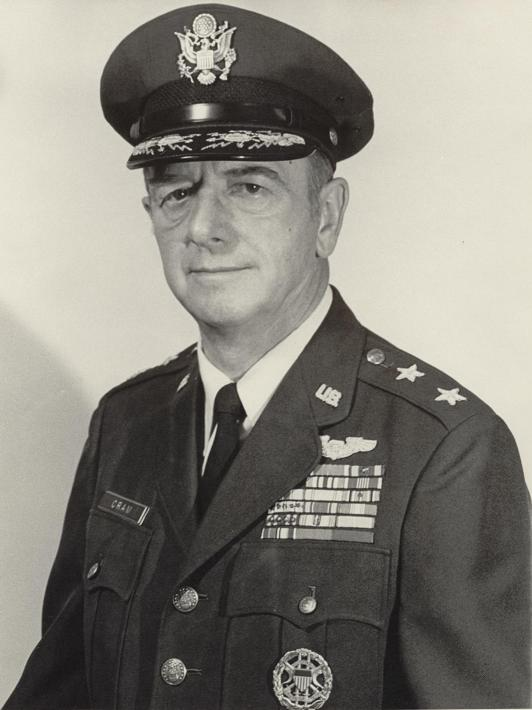
- Cram during his tenure as the Adjutant General of the Vermont National Guard
- Born: April 29, 1914; Northfield, Vermont, U.S.
- Died: August 6, 2004 (aged 90); Burlington, Vermont, U.S.
- Burial place: Mount Hope Cemetery, Northfield, Vermont, U.S.
- Military career
- Allegiance: United States of America: State of Vermont
- Branch: United States Air Force
- Service years: 1933–1981
- Rank: Major general
- Unit: Vermont National Guard
- Commands: Air Force Branch, Supreme Headquarters Allied Powers Europe; U.S. Air Force Orientation Group; Vermont National Guard
- Conflicts: World War II; Korean War; Vietnam War
- Awards: Air Force Distinguished Service Medal; Legion of Merit; Air Medal

Reginald Maurice Cram (April 29, 1914 – August 6, 2004) was a United States Air Force officer who served as the adjutant general of the Vermont National Guard.

== Early life and education ==
Cram was born in Northfield, Vermont, on April 29, 1914. He graduated from Norwich University in 1936, and was Captain of the Corps of Cadets, while also becoming a member of the Theta Chi fraternity, Pegasus Players theater group, Glee Club, Band, and basketball team. Cram maintained his affiliation with Norwich throughout his life, including serving as the agent for his graduating class and composing the Norwich University Alumni March, "A Soldier's Dream". He was a trustee from 1971 to 1988, and received the Distinguished Alumni Award.

== Career ==
Cram joined the Vermont National Guard's 172nd Infantry Regiment in 1933. He was commissioned a second lieutenant of Cavalry upon graduating from Norwich, and was assigned to the staff of Vermont's adjutant general. He attended Boston University Law School from 1937 to 1938.

=== World War II ===
Cram joined the Army Air Force for World War II. He received his rating as an Observer, and flew anti-submarine patrols in the Pacific. His assignments included temporary duty with both the Navy and Marine Corps. While on temporary duty with the navy, he served aboard ship with James Roosevelt.

=== Later military career ===
Cram returned to the Vermont National Guard after the war, and joined the active air force in 1947. He was a specialist in long-range planning and international relations, including the creation of policies and programs during the Korean War, and his assignments included: Secretary of the United States-Canada Regional Planning Group, a North Atlantic Treaty Organization entity; director of Plans, Third Air Force; Chief, Air Force Branch, Supreme Headquarters Allied Powers Europe; commander, U.S. Air Force Orientation Group, which provided education on air force initiatives including the space program to U.S. and international civilians and military members; member, Joint Chiefs of Staff Special Study Group; and advisor to the Chairman of the Joint Chiefs of Staff for European Plans and Policy.

He received a master's degree in politics and government from the University of Maryland in 1963. He was also a member of Pi Sigma Alpha, the honor fraternity for those in the political science field. Cram also graduated from the Army Command and General Staff College, Armed Forces Staff College, and National War College. He retired as a colonel in 1964.

=== Adjutant general ===
When Cram retired from the air force in 1964 he was appointed Deputy Adjutant General of the Vermont National Guard, serving under Adjutant General Francis Billado. When Billado died suddenly in September 1966, Cram served as acting adjutant general for three months.

In November another officer, Brigadier General Wayne Page, announced that he would be a candidate for the Adjutant General's post. In December Governor Philip H. Hoff named Page to serve as acting adjutant general. Cram then resigned as deputy and campaigned against Page for a full two-year term. While both Page and Cram were Republicans and Hoff a Democrat, contemporary press accounts indicate that Hoff selected Page because other National Guard officers had expressed to Hoff their preference for Page, an Army National Guard officer, over Cram, an Air National Guard officer, because the majority of the Vermont National Guard was made up of army units. (Since the 1860s, Vermont's adjutant general is elected for a two-year term by the Vermont General Assembly. At the time, elections were held in February of each odd-numbered year, and the term started the following March.)

In February 1967 Cram won an upset victory and ended Page's three-month tenure. Cram was promoted to major general and served as adjutant general from 1967 until retiring in 1981.

During Cram's time as adjutant general, he oversaw the participation of selected Vermont units and soldiers in the Vietnam War, and he traveled to South Vietnam on visits and inspection tours on more than one occasion. The Vermont National Guard also constructed several new armories to consolidate operations and replace aging facilities. In addition, he supervised National Guard activities during state emergencies, including a flood in 1973.

He also increased military participation in winter sports, including hosting several biathlon events in Vermont. These efforts helped create the army's World Class Athlete Program.

In 1980 Cram presided over a muster of the entire Vermont National Guard, which gathered in one location to commemorate the 40th anniversary of the organization's mobilization for World War II.

== Later life and death ==
Cram retired as adjutant general in 1981 and resided in Burlington. He died in Burlington on August 6, 2004, and was buried in Northfield's Mount Hope Cemetery, adjacent to the Norwich University campus.

== Awards and decorations ==
Cram's awards included:

- Air Force Distinguished Service Medal
- Legion of Merit
- Air Medal
- Joint Service Commendation Medal
- Army Commendation Medal
- Air Force Commendation Medal
- Vermont National Guard Distinguished Service Medal
- Office of the Secretary of Defense Identification Badge
- Joint Chiefs of Staff Identification Badge

=== Other honors ===
The mess hall at the National Guard's Camp Ethan Allen Training Site in Jericho, Vermont, is named the Cram Dining Facility.

The entrance road to the Vermont National Guard's Readiness and Regional Technology Center on the Norwich University campus was designated "General Cram Drive" in 2004.

An accomplished biathlete, Cram is a member of the U.S. Biathlon Association Hall of Fame.

== Family ==
Cram married Kathryn Elizabeth "Betty" Mosher in Montpelier, Vermont, on June 29, 1937. She was born in Brattleboro, Vermont, on January 31, 1918, and died in Burlington on October 12, 2011. They had two daughters, Robin and Jane, and six grandchildren.

Military offices
Preceded by Francis William Billado	Vermont Adjutant General; September, 1966–December, 1966	Succeeded by Wayne H. Page
Preceded by Wayne H. Page	Vermont Adjutant General; March, 1967–December, 1981	Succeeded by Donald E. Edwards
