= Murdock A. Campbell =

United States Army Major General

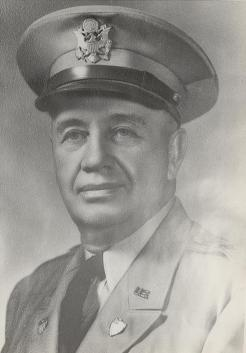
- Murdock A. Campbell, Adjutant General of the Vermont National Guard, 1941–1955
- Born: January 16, 1889; Graniteville, Vermont, US
- Died: August 29, 1972 (aged 83) Berlin, Vermont, US
- Buried: Mount Hope Cemetery; Northfield, Vermont, US
- Allegiance: Vermont; United States
- Branch: United States Army: Vermont National Guard
- Service years: 1917–1955
- Rank: Major General
- Commands: 172nd Infantry Regiment; Vermont National Guard
- Conflicts: World War I World War II; Korean War
- Awards: Vermont Distinguished Service Medal
- Other work: Attorney; Commissioner of the Vermont Department of Motor Vehicles

Murdock A. Campbell (January 16, 1889 – August 29, 1972) was a Vermont attorney and military officer who served as Adjutant General of the Vermont National Guard.

== Early life ==
Murdock Alexander Campbell was born in Graniteville, Vermont, on January 16, 1889. He graduated from Goddard Seminary and worked at a local granite quarry.

Campbell graduated from Albany Business College now (Bryant & Stratton College) and studied at the University of Maine School of Law.

== World War I ==
He joined the 57th Pioneer Infantry Regiment and deployed to France for World War I. Enlisting as a private, he rose to sergeant major before receiving his commission in September, 1918. He served in France from September 1918 to June 1919 and was discharged in July 1919.

== Post-World War I ==
Following the war, Campbell resumed studying law. In 1925, he received his LL.B. degree from National University School of Law (now George Washington University Law School). In 1926, he received a Master of Laws (LL.M.) and a Master of Patent Law (M.P.L) from National University.

He practiced law in Northfield in partnership with Frank Plumley and Charles Albert Plumley. A Republican, he served as Assistant Secretary of the Vermont State Senate from 1927 to 1931 and Secretary from 1931 to 1933. During his term as Secretary, his assistant was Ernest W. Gibson, Jr., with whom Campbell also served in the Vermont National Guard.

From 1933 to 1941, Campbell was Vermont's Commissioner of the Department of Motor Vehicles.

Campbell continued his military service after World War I and rose through the ranks to colonel and commander of the 172nd Infantry Regiment, a unit of the 43rd Infantry Division.

Campbell later took a reduction in rank to lieutenant colonel and a position on the division staff, which enabled Leonard F. Wing to receive promotion to colonel and command of the regiment.

== World War II ==
In 1941, Campbell was mobilized with the 172nd Infantry Regiment and sent to Camp Blanding for training in preparation for deployment overseas. In June Campbell was called home and appointed Assistant Adjutant General, aiding longtime incumbent Herbert Thomas Johnson during Johnson's extended illness.

Campbell succeeded Johnson as Adjutant General when Johnson retired in December 1941.

During the war, Campbell was responsible for mobilizing and deploying Vermont National Guard members to overseas theaters for World War II, and for creating and overseeing the Vermont State Guard, a volunteer organization which handled the in-state duties of the Vermont National Guard while Guard members were overseas.

== Post-World War II ==
Following World War II Campbell's duties were centered on the reorganization of the post-war reorganization of the National Guard and the creation of the Air National Guard.

Campbell was also responsible for overseeing the deployment of Vermont soldiers and airmen mobilized for the Korean War, and for out processing and demobilizing them after the war.

Campbell served as Adjutant General until retiring in 1955. He was succeeded by Francis William Billado, another attorney, member of the Vermont National Guard and longtime acquaintance of Campbell.

== Death and burial ==
In retirement, Campbell lived in Berlin, Vermont.

He died at the Berlin Convalescent Home on August 29, 1972. He was buried in Northfield's Mount Hope Cemetery.

== Awards ==
Campbell was the first recipient of the Vermont Distinguished Service Medal.

Military offices
Preceded by Herbert Thomas Johnson	Vermont Adjutant General; 1941–1955	Succeeded by Francis William Billado
