= Lee Stephen Tillotson =

American lawyer

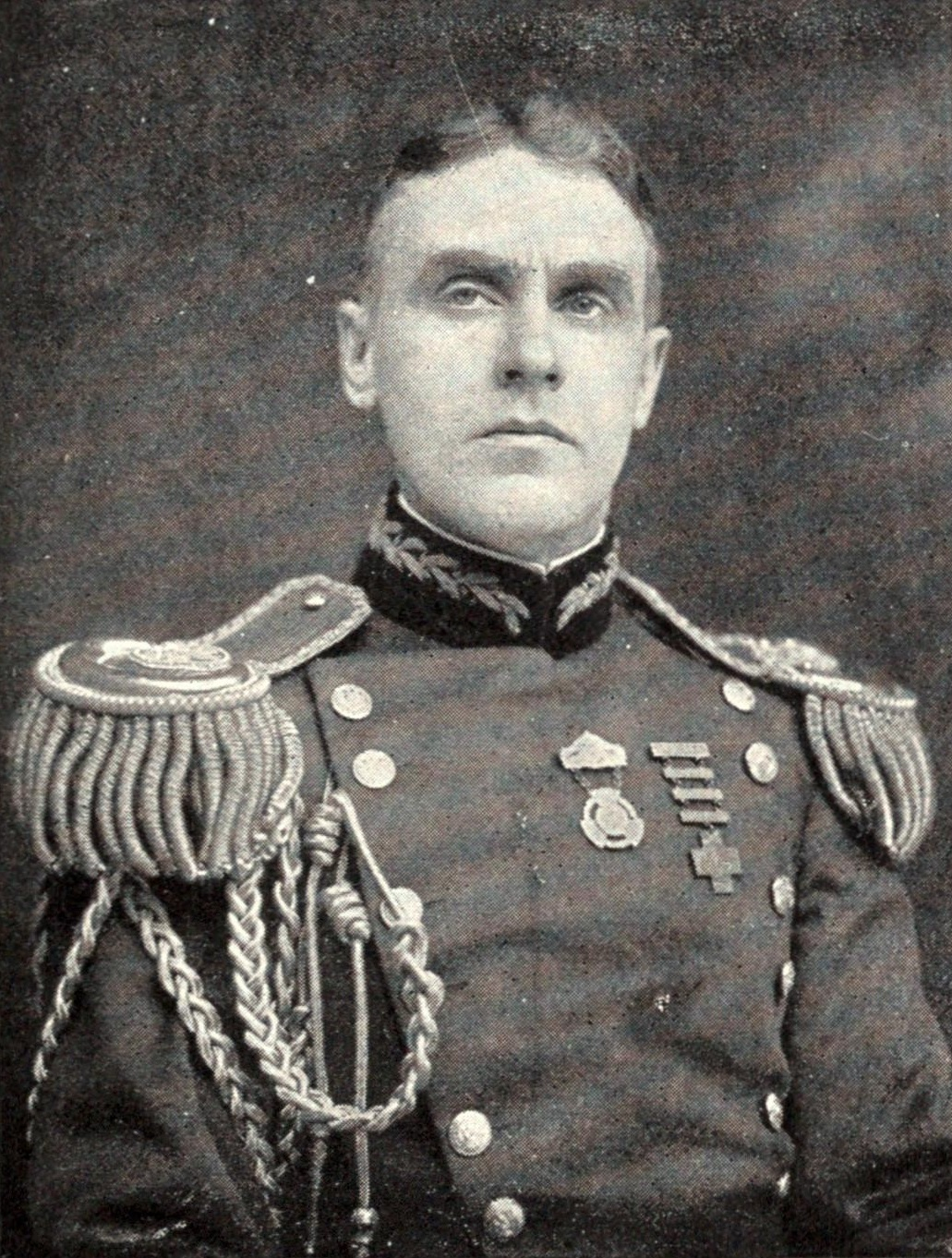
- Tillotson as a brigadier general in 1913.
- Born: December 8, 1874; Bakersfield, Vermont, US
- Died: July 18, 1957 (aged 82) Townshend, Vermont, US
- Buried: Parish Cemetery, Newfane, Vermont
- Allegiance: Vermont; United States
- Branch: Vermont National Guard; United States Army
- Service years: 1898–1917 (National Guard); 1917–1938 (Army)
- Rank: Brigadier General (National Guard); Colonel (Army)
- Commands: Vermont National Guard
- Conflicts: Spanish–American War; World War I
- Other work: Attorney; Judge; Author

Lee Stephen Tillotson (December 8, 1874 – July 18, 1957) was a Vermont military officer and attorney who served as Adjutant General of the Vermont National Guard.

== Early life ==
Lee S. Tillotson was born on December 8, 1874, in Bakersfield, Vermont. Tillotson attended local schools, and graduated from Brigham Academy in 1890. He then joined the Central Vermont Railway in St. Albans, working as a clerk in its main office from 1890 to 1899.

== Start of military career ==
Tillotson joined the Vermont National Guard in 1898. Enlisting as a cornet player, he rose in rank to become the principal musician of the 1st Vermont Volunteer Infantry Regiment during the Spanish–American War. He continued his military service after the war, obtaining a commission as a first lieutenant in 1901 and rising to the rank of lieutenant colonel. He was also an active member of United Spanish War Veterans.

== Musical activities ==
During his life Tillotson continued to pursue his musical interests. He sang in and directed choirs in St. Albans, Boston and Washington, D.C., and also served as Treasurer of the Handel and Haydn Society.

== Start of legal career ==
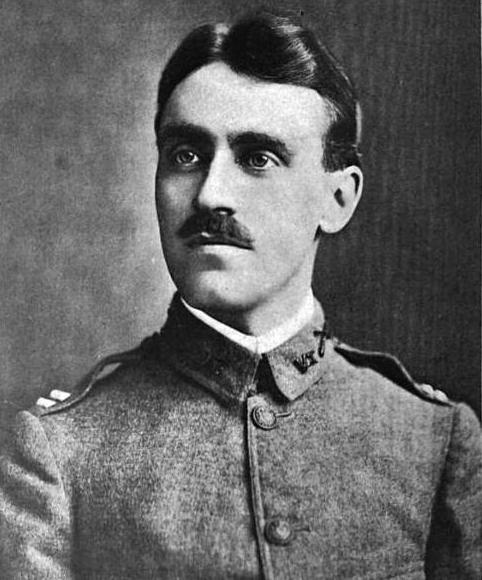
Tillotson as a captain in 1907.

Following the Spanish–American War Tillotson resigned from the Central Vermont Railroad to pursue legal studies in the office of St. Albans Attorney Alfred A. Hall. He attained admission to the bar in 1902 and began a practice in St. Albans.

A Republican, Tillotson served as Judge of the St. Albans Municipal Court from 1904 to 1906. Tillotson was also involved in other business and government activities, including serving as a member of the board of directors for the gas lighting company in St. Albans and a member of the Vermont Commission on Probation.

== Adjutant General ==
In 1910 Tillotson was appointed Adjutant General of the Vermont National Guard with the rank of brigadier general, filling the position following the death of William H. Gilmore. Tillotson's appointment was a generational break, because he was the first Vermont Adjutant General since the American Civil War who was not a veteran of that conflict. Tillotson won reelection every two years, and continued to serve as Adjutant General until the start of World War I. (The Adjutant General is selected for a two-year term by a secret ballot of the Vermont General Assembly. At the time, elections were held in February of each odd numbered year, with the term commencing the following March.)

== World War I ==
He resigned as Adjutant General to enter the regular Army for service in France during World War I, accepting a reduction in rank to serve on active duty, and receiving a commission as a major in the Adjutant General's Corps. He served initially on the staff of the Militia Bureau. In France he served as adjutant of the 93rd Division, a segregated unit of African-American soldiers and white officers. Tillotson then transferred to the staff of the American Expeditionary Forces Services of Supply. Upon returning to the United States, Tillotson served as assistant adjutant of Camp Meade, Maryland, responsible for out processing and discharging soldiers returning from the war.

== Post-World War I ==
Tillotson returned to Vermont in 1919 and ran unsuccessfully for the adjutant general's position, losing to Herbert T. Johnson, who had acted as adjutant general during Tillotson's wartime service. Tillotson then continued his service in the regular Army. In April 1920 he transferred to the Infantry branch, and his postings included adjutant and executive officer of the 21st Regiment, Hawaiian Division. He also became an active member of the American Legion. In 1927 he joined the Judge Advocate General Corps, and was assigned to the War Department’s General Staff.

From 1929 to 1933 Tillotson was the army's liaison officer to the U.S. Senate Committee on Military Affairs. At the time of his retirement in 1938, he was judge advocate of the First Corps Area in Boston. Tillotson retired from active duty as a colonel in 1938. During his Army service Tillotson authored The Articles of War, Annotated and Index/Digest to Uniform Code of Military Justice.

== Masonic career ==
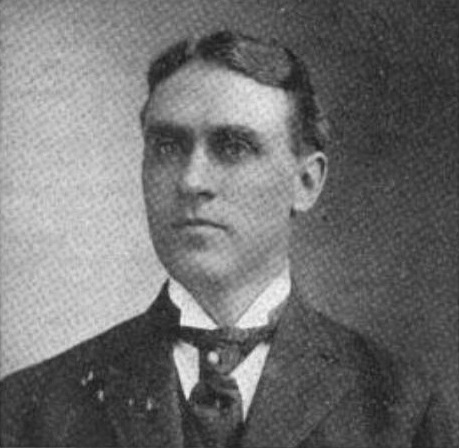
Lee S. Tillotson as Vermont's Masonic Grand Master in 1909

Tillotson was an active Mason attaining the 33rd Degree and serving as Vermont's youngest-ever Grand Master. He also authored History of Ancient Craft Masonry in Vermont and Digest of Masonic Law in Vermont.

== Later life ==
Tillotson returned to Vermont after retiring from the army. Initially he resided in Springfield and practiced law with Alban J. Parker, who went on to serve as Vermont Attorney General.

He later lived in retirement, first in Northfield, and later in Newfane. Tillotson remained active, including serving on Newfane's Board of Selectmen and authoring numerous articles on American history and other topics.

== Death and burial ==
Tillotson died at the hospital in Townshend, Vermont on July 18, 1957, as the result of complications from a fall that left him with a fractured hip. He was buried in Newfane's Parish Cemetery.

== Family ==
In October 1917 Lee Tillotson married Ethel A. Adams (1892–1972) in Montpelier, Vermont. They were the parents of a son, John Adams Tillotson (1919–2005).

Military offices
Preceded by William H. Gilmore	Vermont Adjutant General; 1910–1917	Succeeded by Herbert T. Johnson
