= Herbert Thomas Johnson =

American general (1872–1942)

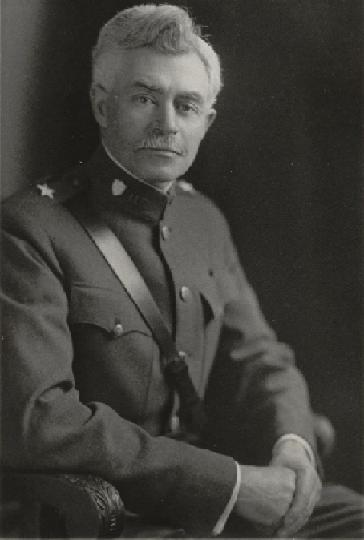
- Johnson as Adjutant General, c. 1920
- Born: January 27, 1872; Bradford, Vermont, US
- Died: November 4, 1942 (aged 70) Montpelier, Vermont, US
- Buried: Upper Plain Cemetery, Bradford, Vermont
- Allegiance: Vermont; United States
- Branch: Vermont National Guard; United States Army
- Service years: 1889–1941
- Rank: Brigadier General
- Commands: Company G, 1st Vermont Infantry Regiment; 3rd Battalion, 1st Vermont Infantry Regiment; 1st Vermont Infantry Regiment; 1st Vermont Militia Regiment; Vermont National Guard
- Conflicts: Spanish–American War; World War I World War II
- Other work: Farmer; Cattle Breeder

Brigadier General Herbert Thomas Johnson (January 27, 1872 – November 4, 1942) was a military officer who served as Adjutant General of the Vermont National Guard.

== Early life ==
Herbert Thomas Johnson was born in Bradford, Vermont on January 27, 1872. He was educated in local schools, graduated from Bradford Academy, and became a dairy farmer and cattle breeder as the owner of Bradford's Stonecliff Farms. Johnson was also an organizer of the Guernsey Breeders Association and served as its president.

A Republican, he served in local offices including Lister, Auditor and Justice of the Peace.

== Spanish–American War ==
In 1889, while still in high school, Johnson enlisted in Company G, 1st Vermont Infantry Regiment. He rose to the rank of sergeant major by 1892, and received his commission as a second lieutenant in January 1894.

Johnson was promoted to captain and commander of Company G in 1896, and mustered into service for the Spanish–American War in May 1898. Federalized as the 1st Vermont Volunteer Infantry, Johnson's regiment served at Camp Thomas near Chickamauga, Georgia, Rossville, Georgia and Fort Ethan Allen, Vermont before mustering out at the end of the war.

== Continued military service ==
Johnson remained in the 1st Vermont Regiment following the war. He was promoted to major and commander of the regiment's 3rd Battalion in 1899, lieutenant colonel in 1910 and colonel and commander of the First Vermont Infantry Regiment in 1914.

== World War I ==
Johnson retired from the National Guard in 1915, but remained active in the Vermont State Guard, a volunteer home guard organization. In 1917 he was appointed to organize and command the 1st Vermont Militia Regiment, a home guard unit. Later that year he was appointed acting adjutant general, succeeding Lee Stephen Tillotson, who resigned to join the regular Army for World War I.

Johnson served as adjutant general throughout the war, and was responsible for mobilizing and transporting National Guard members, enlistees and draftees from Vermont to initial entry centers for in processing and training before departing for France. He also oversaw operations of the home guard which assumed many of the Vermont National Guard's duties while the National Guard was overseas.

Following the war, Johnson and his staff were also responsible for receiving newly discharged soldiers back in Vermont, and for reorganizing the National Guard.

== Later military career ==
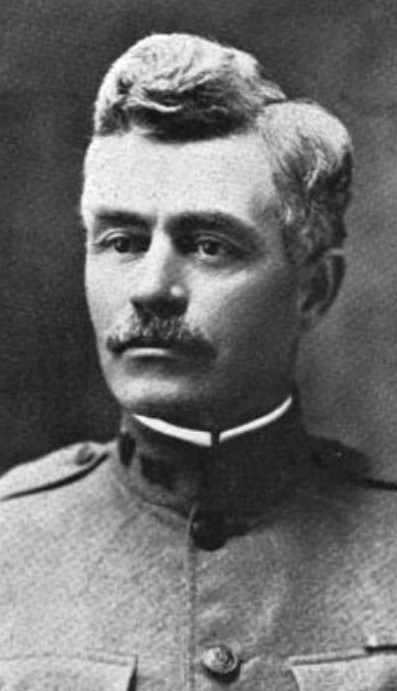
Johnson as Adjutant General in 1919.

In the 1919 election for adjutant general, Tillotson sought to reclaim the post he had held prior to the war. Johnson defeated Tillotson, and continued to serve as adjutant general. (Vermont's adjutant general is elected to a two-year term by the Vermont General Assembly. At the time, elections were held in February of each odd-numbered year, and the term started in March.) Tillotson returned to the Army, and served until retiring as a colonel in 1938.

As Adjutant General Johnson oversaw the construction of 12 new armories, modernization of the Vermont National Guard after World War I, and the Vermont National Guard's response to the Flood of 1927.

In 1924 Johnson graduated from the United States Army War College, the first state adjutant general to do so.

At the start of World War II Johnson was appointed Vermont's federal Director of Selective Service, responsible for ensuring that eligible men registered for the draft. He continued to serve until 1941, when he retired because of ill health and was succeeded by Murdock A. Campbell. His 24 years in the position make him Vermont's second longest-serving adjutant general, behind only the first holder of the post, David Fay.

Johnson was an active member of the Adjutants General Association of the United States (AGAUS) and served as its president.

== Death and burial ==
Johnson died at the Vermont State House on November 4, 1942, while meeting with Governor William Wills to discuss the Vermont National Guard's mobilization for World War II and plans to form a home guard that would take on the National Guard's state duties during the war.

He was buried at Bradford's Upper Plain Cemetery. General Johnson's grave is near that of William H. Gilmore, one of Johnson's predecessors as adjutant general.

== Family ==
In 1895 Johnson married Myra Luella Burbeck (1876–1951) in Danvers, Massachusetts. Their children included Ruth Burbeck Johnson Tompkins (1898–1982), Thomas Herbert Johnson (1902–1985), and Edward Carleton Johnson (1904–1928).

Ruth Burbeck Johnson was a Middlebury College graduate. She was the first wife of Francis Parker Tompkins, a career Army officer who attained the rank of colonel.

Thomas Herbert Johnson was a teacher and a recognized expert on the life and works of Emily Dickinson.

Edward Carleton Johnson was a salesman and a lieutenant in the Vermont National Guard when he died after the onset of Polio.

== Naming of Vermont National Guard Headquarters ==
The Vermont National Guard's main site is Camp Johnson in Colchester.

In 1894 the Vermont General Assembly authorized purchase of a portion of Fort Ethan Allen as a National Guard training site, and the National Guard used the location to muster troops during the Spanish–American War. In 1900 the Vermont National Guard took permanent possession. This site, christened the State Military Reservation, was used for both individual and unit training and as a staging area for mobilizations. After the Spanish–American War the site was called Camp Olympia after the flagship of Admiral George Dewey, a Vermont native. In later years the camp was named after successive Governors.

In 1945 the State Reservation was renamed Camp Johnson to honor Herbert T. Johnson, recognizing his service as the adjutant general who led Vermont's military during the world wars and the period in between.

Military offices
Preceded by Lee Stephen Tillotson	Vermont Adjutant General; 1917–1941	Succeeded by Murdock A. Campbell
