= Kathy Hoyt =

American politician (born 1942)

Member of the Vermont House of Representatives from the 2nd Windsor-Orange district
- In office October 1, 2013 – January 7, 2015 Serving with Jim Masland
- Appointed by: Peter Shumlin
- Preceded by: Margaret Cheney
- Succeeded by: Timothy Briglin

Vermont Secretary of Administration
- In office May 1, 1997 – November 1, 2002
- Governor: Howard Dean
- Preceded by: William Sorrell
- Succeeded by: Sean Campbell

Personal details
- Born: Kathleen Conner Clark; June 6, 1942 (age 84) Rich Square, North Carolina, U.S.
- Party: Democratic
- Spouse: Norris Hoyt (m. 1974; died 2013)
- Education: University of North Carolina at Greensboro (BA)

Kathleen Clark Hoyt (born June 6, 1942) is an American politician who served as chief of staff to Vermont governors Madeleine Kunin and Howard Dean and as Vermont Secretary of Administration. She was appointed to the Vermont House of Representatives in 2013 by Governor Peter Shumlin but chose not to run for reelection due to illness. She attended the University of North Carolina at Greensboro and was married to state representative Norris Hoyt in 1974 until his death in 2013.
