= Norris Hoyt =

American politician (1935–2013)

Personal details
- Born: Norris Hulbert Hoyt Jr. July 23, 1935 Chicago, Illinois, U.S.
- Died: August 4, 2013 (aged 78) Norwich, Vermont, U.S.
- Party: Democratic
- Spouse: Kathleen Clark (m. 1974)
- Education: Amherst College (AB); Harvard University (JD); Boston University (LLM)

Norris Hulbert "Norrie" Hoyt Jr. (July 23, 1935 – August 4, 2013) was an American politician.

== Biography ==
Born in Chicago, Illinois, on July 23, 1935, he grew up in Arlington, Massachusetts. He graduated from Amherst College and received his Juris Doctor degree from Harvard Law School. Hoyt also received his master's degree from Boston University. In 1968, he moved to Vermont serving as deputy commissioner of taxation. He served in the Vermont House of Representatives from 1974 to 1985 as a Democrat. In 1985, he became Commissioner of the Department of Taxation and later Commissioner of Liquor Control. He practiced law in Norwich, Vermont, after moving there in 1970. He died in Norwich on August 4, 2013.
