= Donald E. Edwards =

American state military officer

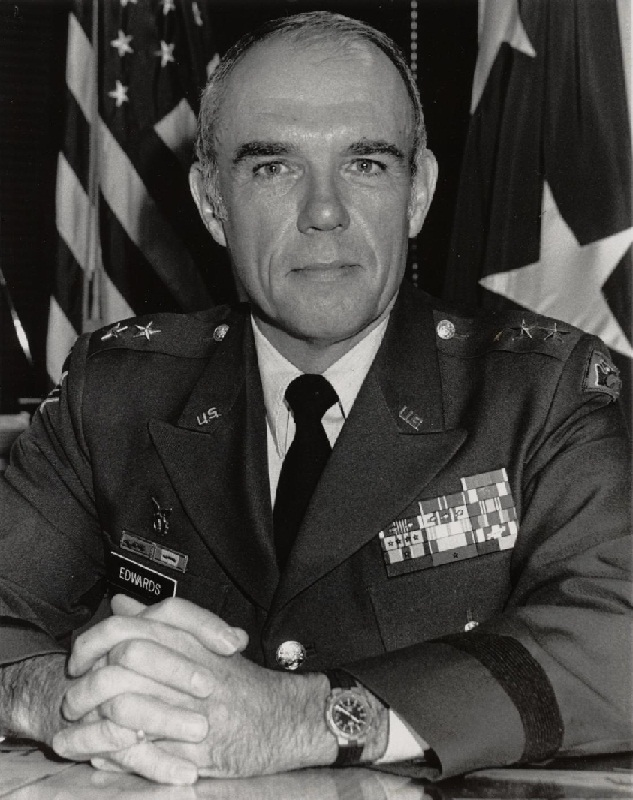
- Edwards during his tenure as adjutant general of Vermont
- Born: June 15, 1937; Bellows Falls, Vermont, U.S.
- Died: August 16, 2018 (aged 81); South Bristol, Maine, U.S.
- Military career
- Allegiance: United States
- Branch: United States Army
- Service years: 1959–1997
- Rank: Major General
- Units: United States Army Armor Branch; U.S. Army Transportation Corps
- Commands: 413th Supply and Service Battalion; Vermont National Guard
- Conflicts: Vietnam War
- Awards: Legion of Merit; Bronze Star Medal; Meritorious Service Medal; Army Commendation Medal
- Other work: Member, Vermont House of Representatives; Staff assistant, U.S. Rep. Bernie Sanders

Donald E. Edwards (June 15, 1937 – August 16, 2018) was an American military officer. He was most notable for his service as adjutant general of the State of Vermont from 1981 to 1997. The adjutant general is the senior uniformed officer in the state and responsible for the organization, training and equipping of nearly 4,000 members of the Vermont Army and Air National Guard. His position as Adjutant General also included appointment as Inspector General and Quartermaster General, and head of the State Military Department, including the Veterans Affairs office.

== Early life and start of military career ==
Donald Everett Edwards was born in Bellows Falls, Vermont, on June 15, 1937, the son of attorney Ralph Everett Edwards and Anne Jane (Edmunds) Edwards. He attended school in Saxtons River, Vermont and graduated from Vermont Academy in 1955. He began his military career as a second lieutenant in the United States Army Armor Branch in 1959 after graduation from Norwich University and completion of the Reserve Officer Training Corps program. He later became qualified as a Transportation officer, and served with the regular Army until 1971, with assignments including three years in West Germany, two in Vietnam (1965–66, 1968–69) during the Vietnam War, and two in England (1969–71) as part of a professional exchange program with the British Army.

Edwards served in the Army Reserve from 1971 until his appointment by the Vermont General Assembly as Adjutant General of the Vermont National Guard in 1981, and his Reserve service included command of a battalion.

== Civilian career ==
Between leaving active duty in 1971 and being appointed Adjutant General in 1981, Edwards was employed as a dealer in fine arts and antiques and an appraiser of real property, antiques and household effects. He also served as a member of Grafton, Vermont's School Board and Planning Commission as well as the Windham Regional Planning Commission. From 1975 to 1981 he was a Democratic member of the Vermont House of Representatives.

== Education ==
- 1959, Norwich University, Bachelor of Arts, government/pre-law, Northfield, Vermont
- 1968, University of Tennessee, Master of Science, transportation, Knoxville, Tennessee
- 1977, United States Army Command and General Staff College, Command and General Staff Officer Course, Fort Leavenworth, Kansas.
- 1980, United States Army War College, Carlisle, Pennsylvania

Edwards was also a graduate of the Program for Senior Executives in State and Local Government at Harvard University's John F. Kennedy School of Government.

== Assignments ==
- June 6, 1959 – October 31, 1971, United States Army, including deployment for the Vietnam War and command of a company
- November 1, 1971 – February 28, 1981, United States Army Reserve, including command of the 413th Supply and Service Battalion
- March 1, 1981 – March 31, 1997, The Adjutant General, Vermont National Guard, Winooski (later Colchester), Vermont

== Awards and decorations ==
- Legion of Merit
- Bronze Star Medal
- Meritorious Service Medal
- Army Commendation Medal (with Two Oak Leaf Clusters)
- Army Reserve Components Achievement Medal (with One Silver Oak Leaf Cluster)
- National Defense Service Medal (with One Bronze Service Star)
- Vietnam Service Medal
- Armed Forces Reserve Medal (with Silver Hourglass)
- Army Service Ribbon
- Army Reserve Components Overseas Training Ribbon (with Numeral 1)
- Republic of Vietnam Campaign Medal
- Vietnam Armed Forces Honor Medal (First Class)
- Vietnam Transportation Badge
- Overseas Service Bar (4)
- Vermont Outstanding Unit Award
- Vermont Service Ribbon (with 3 Bronze Service Stars)
- Vermont Duty Ribbon (with 4 Bronze Service Stars)
- Vermont State Special Duty Ribbon

== Effective dates of promotion ==
- Second Lieutenant, June 6, 1959
- First Lieutenant, December 6, 1960
- Captain, June 6, 1963
- Major, July 14, 1967
- Lieutenant Colonel, December 15, 1975
- Colonel, December 14, 1980
- Brigadier General, March 2, 1982
- Major General, May 10, 1983

== Military retirement ==
In 1997 Edwards was defeated for reappointment as adjutant general, losing the legislature's election to Martha Rainville. (In Vermont, the adjutant general is elected for a two-year term by a secret ballot of the Vermont General Assembly.) Rainville became the first woman to ever be appointed as a state adjutant general. Edwards retired from the military upon Rainville assuming the adjutant general's duties.

== Later career ==
After his military retirement General Edwards served on the staff of U.S. Representative Bernie Sanders for two years. Later he was an on-air commentator for Fox News and the Executive Vice President of an Information Technology company.

== Retirement ==
In retirement Edwards continued to comment on public affairs in magazine articles and other media. He was a member of the National Veterans Steering Committee during John F. Kerry's 2004 presidential campaign. Edwards resided in South Bristol, Maine and Ashburn, Virginia.

== Other achievements ==
Edwards served as president of the Adjutants General Association of the United States and was a vice president of the National Guard Association of the United States.

== Death and burial ==
Edwards died in South Bristol, Maine on August 16, 2018. He was buried at Old Oak Cemetery in South Bristol.

== Family ==
In 1960, Edwards married Mary Baldasaro; they divorced in June 1965. Later that month, Edwards married Julie Ellen Schmid, a native of Iowa. In 1982, Edwards married Elizabeth M. Deppman of Middlebury, Vermont. They divorced in 1991. In 1992, Edwards married Jennifer Suzanne Wool of Essex Junction, Vermont. In 2008, he married Susan Marie Bean in Loudoun, Virginia.

Edwards was the father of two sons, William E. and Edmund E. Edwards. In addition to them, he was survived by his wife Sue, and his step-children Elijah, Josiah, Ariadne, and Nathaniel.

Military offices
Preceded by Reginald M. Cram	Vermont Adjutant General; 1981–1997	Succeeded by Martha Rainville
