= William H. Gilmore =

American politician

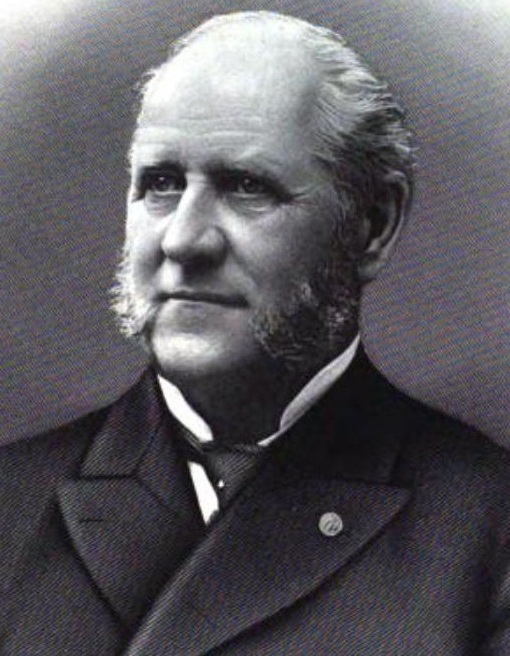
- From Volume 2 of 1903's Genealogical and Family History of the State of Vermont
- Born: October 17, 1839; Fairlee, Vermont, US
- Died: April 18, 1910 (aged 70) Bellows Falls, Vermont, US
- Buried: Upper Plain Cemetery, Bradford, Vermont
- Allegiance: United States of America; Vermont
- Branch: Union Army; Vermont National Guard
- Service years: 1861–1864 (Army); 1882–1910 (Vermont National Guard)
- Rank: Sergeant (Army); Major general (National Guard)
- Commands: Vermont National Guard
- Conflicts: American Civil War
- Other work: Farmer; Town treasurer Bank president Member, Vermont House of Representatives; Member, Vermont Senate

William Harrison Gilmore (October 17, 1839 – April 18, 1910) was a Vermont political and military figure. He served in the Vermont House of Representatives, as a member of the Vermont Senate, and as Adjutant General of the Vermont Militia.

== Biography ==
William H. Gilmore was born in Fairlee, Vermont, on October 17, 1839. The son of state legislator and probate judge Alexander H. Gilmore, he was educated at New London Academy (now Colby-Sawyer College) and began a career as a farmer in Fairlee.

== Civil War ==
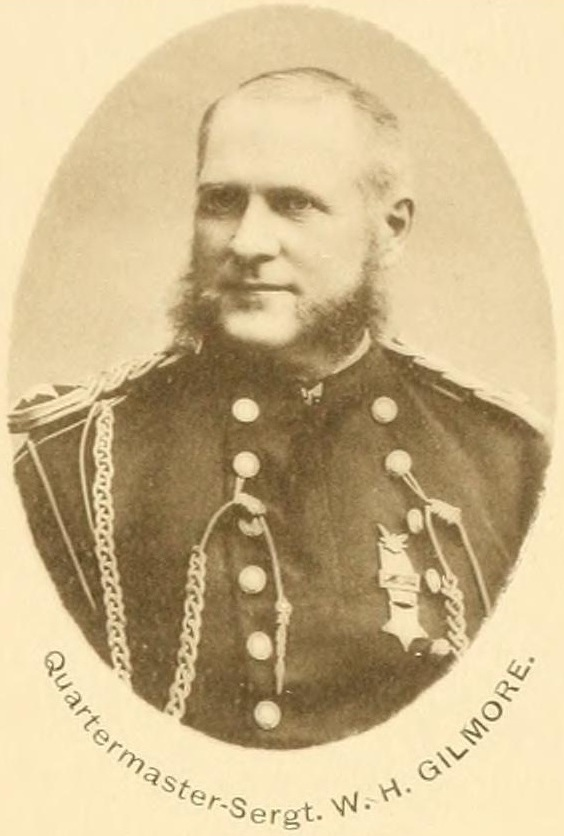
William H. Gilmore, Regimental Quartermaster Sergeant, 8th Vermont Infantry

In 1861 Gilmore joined Company D, 8th Vermont Volunteer Infantry Regiment. (Note: The 8th Vermont was raised for service in the Department of the Gulf before transferring to Virginia. See its Wikipedia article for more information.) Enlisting as a private, he served until being mustered out in 1864, and rose in rank to become the regiment's supply sergeant. On several occasions he was commended for sustaining the regiment in battle by arranging for the timely acquisition and distribution of food, ammunition and equipment.

== Post-Civil War ==
After the war Gilmore returned to farming in Fairlee. A Republican, he was Town Treasurer for over 39 years, and served in the Vermont House in 1878 and the Vermont Senate in 1882. Gilmore was a member of the Reunion Society of Vermont Officers and the Grand Army of the Republic, and served as president of the Orange County Agricultural Society. In addition, the Sons of Veterans post in Williamstown was named for him.

Gilmore was also active in several businesses, including serving as president of the Bradford National Bank.

== Continued military service ==
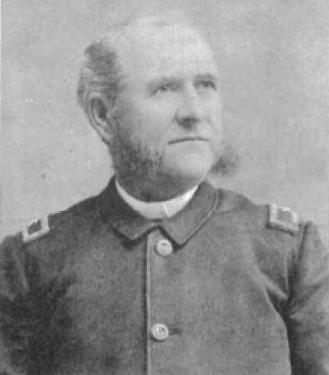
William H. Gilmore, Vermont Adjutant General

In 1882 Gilmore accepted appointment as a colonel on the staff of Governor John L. Barstow, a fellow veteran of the 8th Vermont, and he served until 1883.

In 1886 Gilmore was elected by the Vermont General Assembly to serve as Quartermaster General of the Vermont Militia, with the rank of brigadier general.

Gilmore was elected Quartermaster, Inspector and Adjutant General of the Vermont Militia with the rank of major general in November 1900 and served until his death.

== Death and burial ==
In later years Gilmore resided in Bradford during the winter and in a cottage on Lake Morey in Fairlee during the summer.

Gilmore died in Bellows Falls, Vermont, on April 18, 1910. He had become ill in March while in town to inspect the local National Guard company, and he remained bedridden in a Bellows Fall hotel while being treated for pneumonia and other ailments. He was buried in Bradford’s Upper Plain Cemetery.

== Family ==
In 1866 Gilmore married Mary T. Haselton (1839–1917). Their children included Alexander H. Gilmore (June 2, 1866 – February 5, 1939), who became a newspaper editor in Newport News, Virginia, Macon, Georgia, and New Castle, Delaware, and Kathie Gilmore, the wife of Harry B. Chamberlin, a Vermont businessman who served as an officer in Vermont National Guard, joined the army for the Spanish–American War and was later assigned to Alabama, California and other posts throughout the country.

Military offices
Preceded by Theodore S. Peck	Vermont Adjutant General; 1900–1910	Succeeded by Lee Stephen Tillotson
