= Cheryl Rivers =

American politician

Member of the Vermont Senate from the Windsor district
- In office January 9, 1991 – January 8, 2003
- Preceded by: Stephen Reynes
- Succeeded by: Matt Dunne

Personal details
- Born: September 12, 1951 (age 75) Rutland, Vermont
- Party: Democratic

Cheryl Rivers (born September 12, 1951) is an American politician who served in the Vermont Senate from the Windsor district from 1991 to 2003.
