= Vermont National Guard =

Unit of the US Army National Guard for the State of Vermont

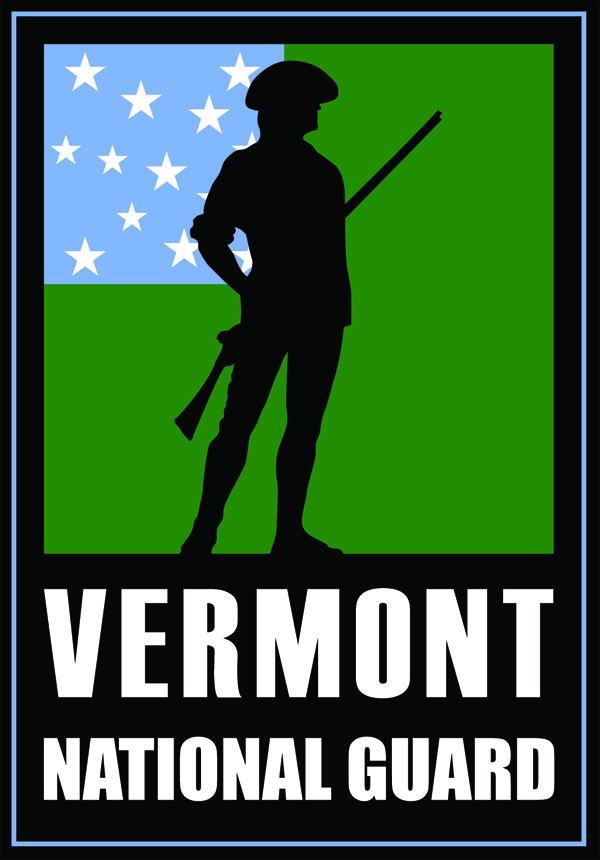
- Logo of the Vermont National Guard
- Active: 1764–1814 (the Green Mountain Boys); Army Guard: 1860s, 1898, 1917–1918, 1923–present Air Guard: 1946–present
- Country: United States
- Allegiance: State of Vermont
- Type: National Guard
- Size: Approximately 4,000 (3,000 Army, 1,000 Air)
- Part of: Joint Force Headquarters – Vermont; 86th Infantry Brigade Combat Team (Mountain); 124th Regiment (Regional Training Institute); Vermont National Guard Garrison Support Command; 158th Fighter Wing
- Nickname: The Green Mountain Boys
- Colors: Green, gold and blue
- Engagements: Gettysburg, St. Albans
- Website: https://vt.public.ng.mil/

Commanders
- Current commander: Henry U. Harder (Since March, 2026)
- Notable commanders: Isaac Fletcher (1824–1825); Peter T. Washburn (1861–1866); William Wells (1866–1872); Theodore S. Peck (1881–1901); Donald E. Edwards (1981–1997); Martha Rainville (1997–2006); Michael Dubie (2006–2012); Thomas E. Drew (2012–2013)

Insignia
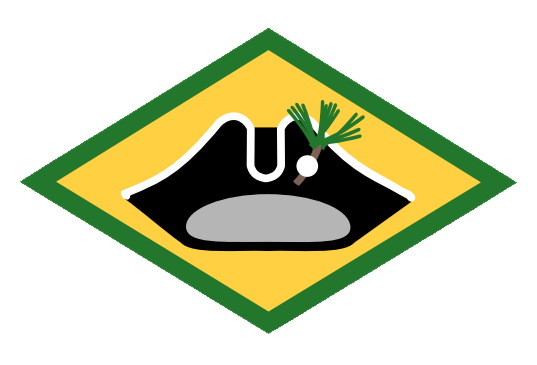
- Joint Force Headquarters shoulder sleeve insignia

- Flag of the Green Mountain Boys

- Vermont Army National Guard Crest

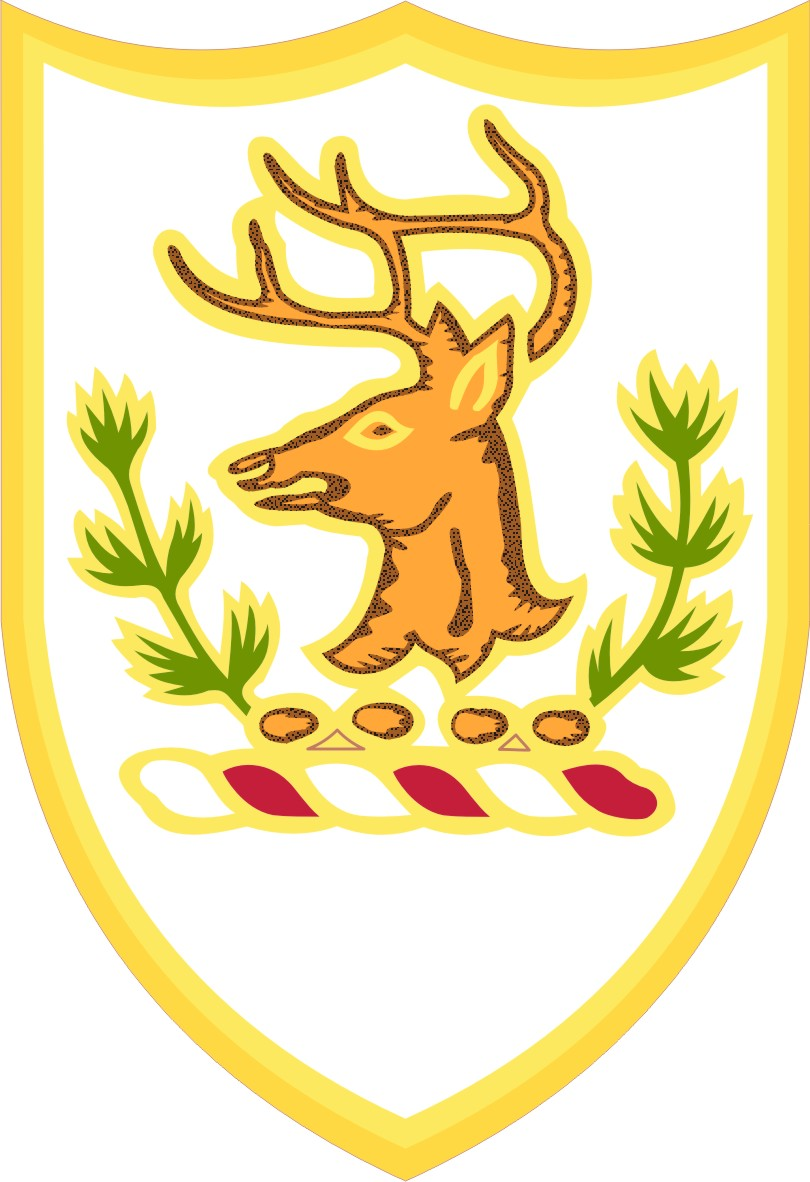
- Vermont ARNG STARC DUI

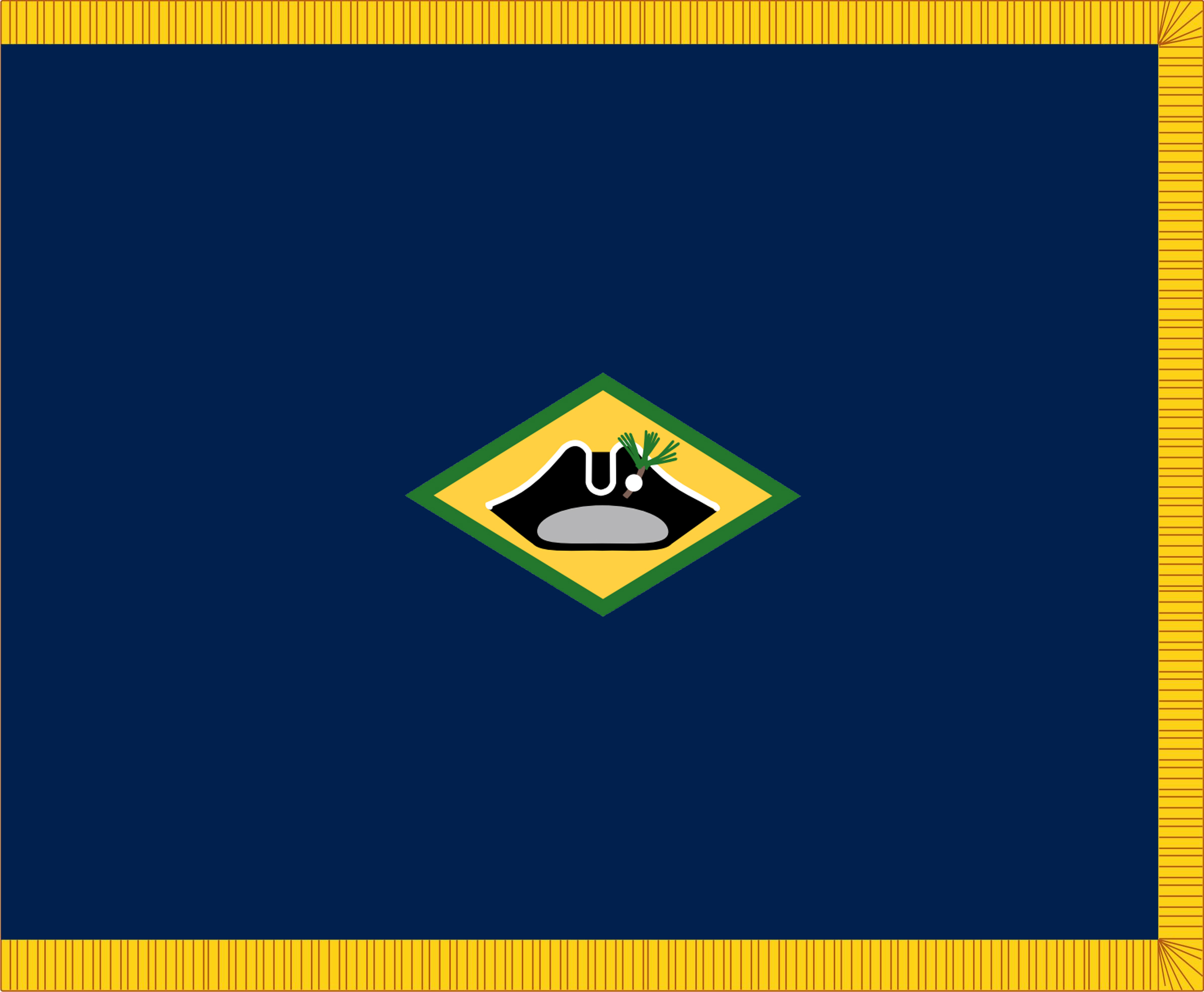
- Vermont Army National Guard Headquarters Flag

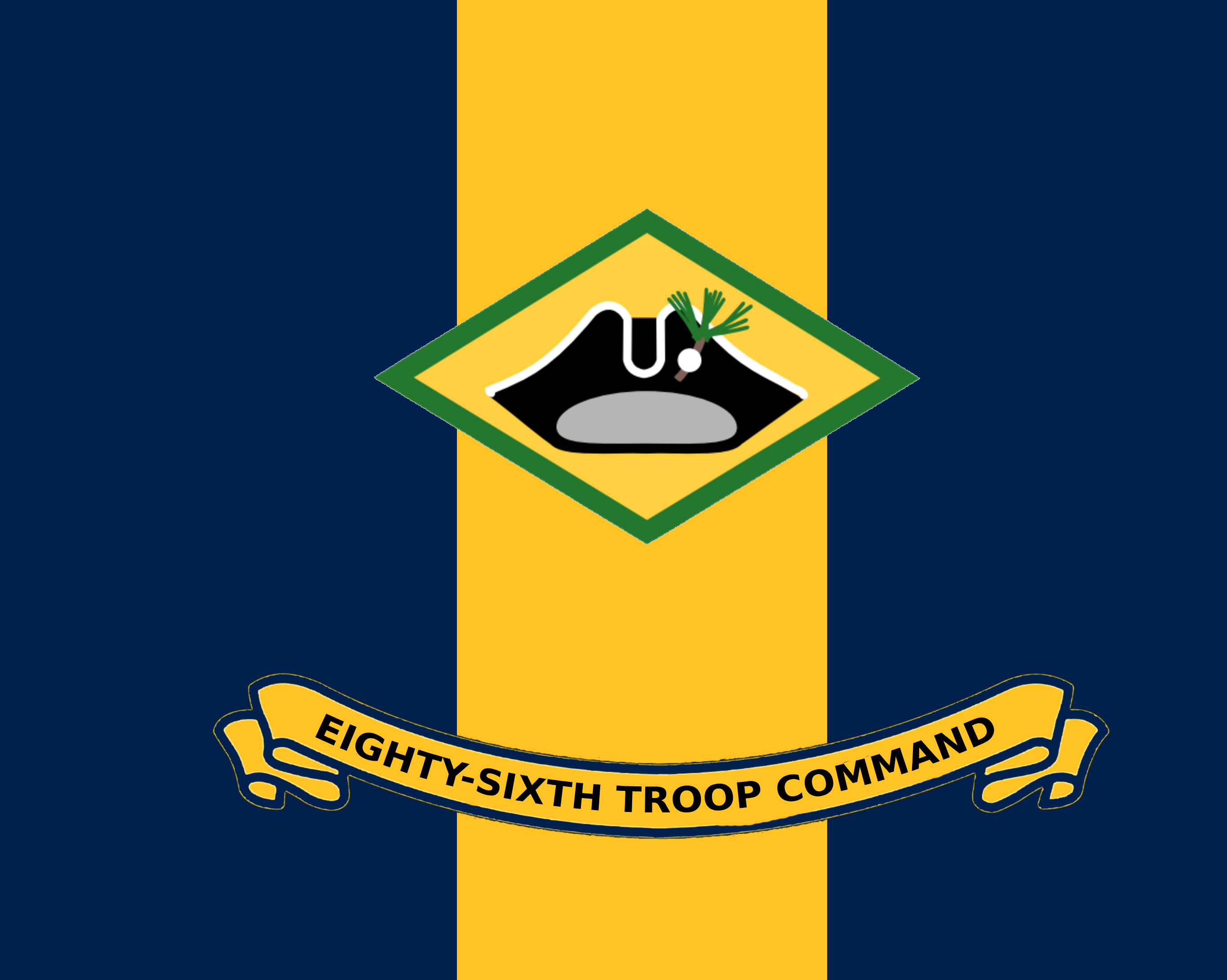
- Vermont Army National Guard 86th Troop Command Flag

The Vermont National Guard is composed of the Vermont Army National Guard and the Vermont Air National Guard. Together, they are collectively known as the Green Mountain Boys. Both units use the original Revolutionary War-era flag of the Green Mountain Boys as their banner. In 2026, the Vermont National consisted of about 4,000 members – 3,000 in the Army National Guard and 1,000 in the Air National Guard.

== History ==
=== Colonial ===
Settlers relied on the militia almost from the moment they began moving into Vermont in the mid-1700s. Units were often formed as needed, and usually for brief periods of time. Since most Vermonters had obtained land grants from New Hampshire's governor, they relied on the militia to resist attempts by the government of New York to exert control over the grants. However, Vermonters were also willing to work with the British colonies when it suited them, and several early Vermont settlers served as militia in the French and Indian War.

In the late 1760s and early 1770s, the militia took on a more organized structure and formalized its name, the Green Mountain Boys, with Ethan Allen appointed as Colonel and commandant, and Seth Warner and Remember Baker as company commanders with the rank of Captain. In Vermont's pre-Revolutionary War days, the legislature or committee of safety would generally call out the militia as needed, its members would elect their leaders, and the legislature or committee of safety would confirm them. On occasion, the elections by members were not ratified. Perhaps the most noteworthy example of this occurred in 1775, when the Green Mountain Boys became part of the Continental Army, and the committee of safety selected Warner over Allen as colonel and commander.

Since Vermont was not part of the British colonies that declared independence, the Continental Congress did not automatically accept Allen's and Warner's request for the Green Mountain Boys to be directly accessed into the army. Instead, they asked Allen and Warner to work through New York's Provincial Congress to facilitate the process. New York agreed and provided uniforms, equipment and pay, as well as authorizing officer's commissions. When Allen was denied the command, he met with Major General Philip Schuyler and offered to serve in any capacity—with a commission or without, with pay or without. Overcoming his previous misgivings about Allen, Schuyler accepted, and Allen was appointed a Lieutenant Colonel in the Continental Army.

When Schuyler gave up command temporarily because of illness he was succeeded by Richard Montgomery. Montgomery allowed Allen to attempt to raise troops for an invasion of Canada. Allen was captured at the Battle of Longue-Pointe and spent over two years as a prisoner of war.

With the Green Mountain Boys called to active duty, Vermont reorganized its militia to defend the border with Canada and protect Vermont from invasion. After Allen's release, he returned to Vermont and was appointed commander of the reorganized militia. Roger Enos, the father-in-law of Ira Allen, and a veteran of over twenty years in the Connecticut and Vermont militias, was later appointed commander with the rank of Brigadier General, and he was later promoted to Major General.

=== Statehood ===
After Vermont attained statehood, its militia was organized into several divisions. The governor served as head of the militia, with the title "Captain General and Commander in Chief", and the division commanders, who held the rank of major general, reported to the adjutant general, who reported to the governor. Noteworthy among the individuals who commanded divisions during this period was Martin Chittenden, the son of Thomas Chittenden, Vermont's first governor.

Though most Vermonters did not support fighting the British in the War of 1812, preferring the economic prosperity they derived from trade with the British dominion of Canada, units of the state militia were mobilized after the British invaded upstate New York, with General Samuel Strong of Vergennes leading a successful Vermont Militia attack at Plattsburgh as part of an American effort that resulted in a British retreat.

Martin Chittenden served in the U.S. House from 1803 to 1813, and as governor from 1813 to 1815. As one of the majority of Vermonters who opposed U.S. involvement in the War of 1812, in November, 1813 he issued an order for Vermont Militia units that had been mobilized and sent to New York to return immediately to Vermont, arguing that the federal government had no right to command state militia troops, and that the militia was needed to guard Vermont's border with Canada. The commander in Plattsburgh, General Jacob Davis of Milton, positively refused, countering that once the militia was ordered into federal service, it was no longer subject to the governor's orders.

U.S. forces, including the Vermont Militia, remained encamped near Plattsburgh until they returned home in December, and Chittenden took no action against Davis. U.S. House members from Kentucky who supported the War of 1812 introduced resolutions calling for criminal charges to be pursued against Chittenden, which were never acted on, but Vermont public opinion on the war had changed and Vermonters demonstrated their displeasure with Chittenden's stance by defeating his bid for a third one-year term in 1815.

In the wake of the War of 1812, the federal government attempted to standardize training and laws governing call up and mobilization for militia organizations throughout the United States. As a result, state governors were no longer in direct command with military rank, but appointed an adjutant general who reported directly to the governor and served as commander of the state militia. As with other states, Vermont's adjutant general was originally appointed by the governor. Subsequent changes to Vermont law conferred this appointment power on the state legislature, which still elects the adjutant general every two years. (A few other states also modified their selection process. As one example, until 2014 the adjutant general in South Carolina was elected statewide directly by the voters.)

The Vermont adjutant general's office was marked in the 1820s and 1830s by efforts to reenergize the militia after interest started to lapse following the War of 1812.

In the 1830s and 1840s militia activity nationwide was on the wane, largely the result of the long period of relative peace that followed the War of 1812. Militia membership, once compulsory, was rife with exemptions. Regular drills were replaced by once a year "muster days" that were more picnic than military formation. Vermont was no exception, and its militia records for this era are incomplete.

In the late 1830s the Vermont Legislature began to reenergize its military.

From the late 1830s on, the office worked in conjunction with the faculty of Norwich University to reorganize and obtain funding for the militia, and convened annual meetings of like-minded individuals to plan ways to increase participation.

=== Civil War ===
H. H. Baxter, Vermont's adjutant general in the late 1850s and early 1860s, was commended for taking measures to prepare the militia for mobilization in anticipation of the Civil War. At the outbreak of hostilities his office oversaw recruiting, equipping and training of federal volunteers, and mustered in the first Vermonters activated for wartime service, the 1st Vermont Infantry Regiment.

During the Civil War Peter T. Washburn, Baxter's successor, earned accolades for bringing order to the process of recruiting, equipping, training and transporting recruits for the Union Army, working with Norwich University to develop a process that was later adopted by other Union states.

=== Post Civil War ===
After the Civil War, successive Vermont Adjutants General initiated efforts to obtain benefits for Vermont's Civil War veterans, including establishment of the Vermont Soldiers' Home.

In the late 1890s, the Adjutant General of Vermont was responsible for preparing Vermont units to take part in the Spanish–American War (1898).

=== 20th century ===
In the early 1900s a major project undertaken by Vermont's adjutants general was a renovation and cataloging of the Vermont National Guard's archives, including muster rolls, payrolls and unit rosters dating back to the Revolution.

=== Two World Wars ===
Herbert Johnson became acting adjutant general in 1917 when the incumbent resigned to join the regular army for World War I; then adjutant general in 1919. He served for 24 years, and remained Vermont's longest-serving adjutant general.

During World War I (1917–1918), Vermont National Guard units served with the 26th Infantry Division (a.k.a. the "Yankee" Division).

Johnson and his staff oversaw the construction of 12 new armories and the modernizing and reorganizing of the Vermont National Guard after World War I. Johnson also advocated improved relations between the regular army and the National Guard, including the standardization of training and unit organizations.

During the Flood of 1927, the Vermont National Guard overcame the downing of telephone and telegraph lines by following Johnson's directive to operate on their own initiative during recovery efforts, and the National Guard took part in evacuations of people from flooded areas, clearing roads, and providing food, water and other emergency aid.

In the early to mid-1930s Johnson worked to maintain funding for the National Guard while states and the federal government struggled with the loss of revenue caused by the Great Depression. These efforts to preserve the Guard's readiness and force structure were later acknowledged by historians to have played an important part in the Army's rapid response after the US entered World War II.

=== World War II and the Korean War ===
Johnson and his successor, Murdoch Campbell, received accolades for organizing the volunteer Vermont State Guard that performed many state duties while National Guard soldiers were deployed in the European and Pacific Theaters during World War II.

During World War II (1941–1945), Vermont National Guard units served with the 43rd Infantry Division (a.k.a. the "Winged Victory" Division) in the Pacific Theater of War, notably in the Solomons and on Luzon in the Philippines. The 2nd Battalion of the 172nd Infantry Regiment earned a Presidential Unit Citation for combat actions during the Battle of the Ipo Dam, Luzon in mid May 1945.

Campbell also received credit for successfully deploying the Vermont National Guard during the Korean War, organizing the Vermont Air National Guard, modernizing armories, and converting Vermont units from Infantry to Armor.

Vermont National Guard units were deployed to Germany during the Korean War.

=== Cold War era ===
In 1964 the 86th Armored Brigade was established as a separate brigade of the Vermont Army National Guard.

In September 1966 Adjutant General Francis W. Billado died. From September until December Deputy Adjutant General Reginald Cram acted as adjutant general. In December, 1966 Democratic governor Philip Hoff named Brigadier General Wayne Page, commander of the 86th Armored Brigade, business executive and chairman of the Lamoille County Republican Party, to temporarily fill the adjutant general's position. Cram resigned as deputy adjutant general when Page was sworn in, and then campaigned against Page in the Republican-controlled Vermont General Assembly for a full term as adjutant general. In an upset, Cram defeated Page in the legislature's February, 1967 secret ballot election, ending Page's three-month tenure. Cram served until 1981, while Page retired from the military.

Subsequent reorganizations of the National Guard resulted in the 86th Armored Brigade, which had been a separate organization, becoming part of the 50th Armored Division, then the 26th Infantry Division, and later the 42nd Infantry Division.

On 1 September 1982, the 3rd Battalion, 172nd Infantry Regiment was activated as a mountain warfare unit, a unique unit in the army.

Several Vermont National Guard organizations were activated for Operation Desert Storm, including the 131st Engineer Company, which served in Southwest Asia. The 131st Engineer Company had also been activated for federal service during the Vietnam War.

In 1997 the Vermont National Guard made history when Martha Rainville became the first woman to ever serve as a state adjutant general.

The Vermont National Guard also continued to perform its state mission, including responding after a massive ice storm in 1998.

== 21st century ==
Following the September 11, 2001 terrorist attacks, Vermont Army and Air National Guard members performed missions in support of Operations Noble Eagle, Enduring Freedom in Afghanistan and Iraq.

1st Battalion, 86th Field Artillery was inactivated in 2010. 1st Battalion, 101st Field Artillery is now the artillery battalion assigned to the 86th Brigade, and the battalion includes one battery in Vermont.

1st Battalion, 172nd Armor and 2nd Battalion, 172nd Armor were both inactivated as the result of the 86th Brigade's conversion to Infantry. Most units were reconfigured as parts of 1-172 Cavalry or the 86th Brigade Special Troops Battalion.

In July 2023, Tracey Poirier, the Vermont National Guard's director of the joint staff, was promoted to brigadier general, the first woman to attain general officer's rank in the Vermont Army National Guard.

== Adjutants general ==
In the 1790s Vermont created the positions of adjutant general, inspector general and quartermaster general. Sometimes one individual filled all three positions, and sometimes they were filled separately. The adjutant general (sometimes abbreviated AG for adjutant general or TAG for "the adjutant general") is the senior uniformed military officer in the state, and is responsible for the recruiting, administration, equipping, training, maintenance and readiness of the National Guard. The adjutant general oversees preparations for out-of-state deployments when the National Guard is federally mobilized. The AG also directs the Guard's activities within the state when on state active duty.

In Vermont the adjutant general is elected to a two-year term by the Vermont General Assembly. In the event of a vacancy when the legislature is not in session, the governor is authorized to make a temporary appointment. The election previously took place in February of odd-numbered years, and the term started in March. In 2022, the General Assembly passed legislation moving the election of the adjutant general to February of each even-numbered year beginning in 2024, with the two-year term to begin in March. In addition, the legislation details qualifications candidates for the position must possess, including: having attained the rank of colonel; be a currently serving member of the U.S. Army, U.S. Air Force, U.S. Army Reserve, U.S. Air Force Reserve, Army National Guard, or Air National Guard, or be eligible to return to service in the Army or Air National Guard; be a graduate of a Senior Service College; and be eligible for federal recognition as a general officer.

The individuals who have served as Vermont's adjutant general include:

List of adjutants general
1. David Fay (1794–1822)
2. Daniel Kellogg (1822–1824)
3. Isaac Fletcher (1824–1833)
4. Martin Flint (1833–1837)
5. Frederic Williams Hopkins (1837–1852)
6. Heman R. Smith (1852–1853)
7. Lewis Samuel Partridge (1853–1854)
8. George Bradley Kellogg (1854–1859)
9. Horace Henry Baxter (1859–1861)
10. Peter T. Washburn (1861–1866)
11. William W. Wells (1866–1872)
12. James Stevens Peck (1872–1881)
13. Theodore S. Peck (1881–1900)
14. William H. Gilmore (1900–1910)
15. Lee Stephen Tillotson (1910–1917)
16. Herbert Thomas Johnson (1917–1941)
17. Murdock A. Campbell (1941–1955)
18. Francis William Billado (1955–1966)
19. Reginald M. Cram (1966)
20. Wayne H. Page (1966–1967)
21. Reginald M. Cram (1967–1981)
22. Donald E. Edwards (1981–1997)
23. Martha Rainville (1997–2006)
24. Michael Dubie (2006–2012)
25. Thomas E. Drew (2012–2013)
26. Steven A. Cray, (2013–2019)
27. Gregory C. Knight, (2019–2026)
28. Henry U. Harder, (2026–present)

== Naming of Vermont National Guard State Headquarters ==
The Vermont National Guard's main site is Camp Johnson in Colchester. In 1894 the Vermont General Assembly authorized purchase of a portion of Fort Ethan Allen for use as a National Guard training site. In 1898 the 1st Vermont Infantry Regiment mustered there for the Spanish–American War. In 1900 the Vermont National Guard took possession. This site, christened the State Military Reservation, was named Camp Olympia for the flagship of George Dewey, a native Vermonter. It was later named for successive governors, and used for both individual and unit training and as a staging area for mobilizations. In 1945 the State Reservation was permanently renamed Camp Johnson to honor Herbert T. Johnson, the adjutant general who led Vermont's military during and in between the world wars, and Vermont's second longest-serving adjutant general.

== Vermont Army National Guard units ==
Vermont National Guardsmen supporting Operation Rising Phalanx stand with U.S. and Macedonian troops holding the Green Mountain Boys battle flag in North Macedonia

- Joint Force Headquarters-Vermont, Army Element, at Camp Johnson
  - Headquarters and Headquarters Detachment, Joint Force Headquarters-Vermont, Army Element, at Camp Johnson
  - Vermont Recruiting & Retention Battalion, at Camp Johnson
  - Army Aviation Support Facility #1, at Burlington Airport
  - Combined Support Maintenance Shop #1, at Camp Johnson
  - Field Maintenance Shop #1, at Camp Johnson
  - Field Maintenance Shop #2, in North Hyde Park
  - 86th Infantry Brigade Combat Team (Mountain), at Ethan Allen Firing Range
    - Headquarters and Headquarters Company, 86th Infantry Brigade Combat Team (Mountain), at Ethan Allen Firing Range
    - 1st Squadron, 172nd Cavalry Regiment (Mountain), in St. Albans
      - Headquarters and Headquarters Troop, 1st Squadron, 172nd Cavalry Regiment (Mountain), in St. Albans
      - Troop A, 1st Squadron, 172nd Cavalry Regiment (Mountain), in Newport
      - Troop B, 1st Squadron, 172nd Cavalry Regiment (Mountain), in Bennington
      - Troop C (Dismounted), 1st Squadron, 172nd Cavalry Regiment (Mountain), in Lyndonville
    - 1st Battalion, 102nd Infantry Regiment (Mountain), in New Haven (CT) — (Connecticut Army National Guard)
    - 1st Battalion, 157th Infantry Regiment (Mountain), in Colorado Springs (CO) — (Colorado Army National Guard)
    - 3rd Battalion, 172nd Infantry Regiment (Mountain), at Ethan Allen Firing Range
      - Headquarters and Headquarters Company, 3rd Battalion, 172nd Infantry Regiment (Mountain), at Ethan Allen Firing Range
      - Company A, 3rd Battalion, 172nd Infantry Regiment (Mountain), at Ethan Allen Firing Range
      - Company B, 3rd Battalion, 172nd Infantry Regiment (Mountain), in Brewer (ME) — (Maine Army National Guard)
      - Company C, 3rd Battalion, 172nd Infantry Regiment (Mountain), in Milford (NH) — (New Hampshire Army National Guard)
      - Company D (Weapons), 3rd Battalion, 172nd Infantry Regiment (Mountain), in Westminster
    - 1st Battalion, 101st Field Artillery Regiment, in Brockton (MA) — (Massachusetts Army National Guard)
    - 572nd Brigade Engineer Battalion, in Rutland
      - Headquarters and Headquarters Company, 572nd Brigade Engineer Battalion, in Rutland
      - Company A (Combat Engineer), 572nd Brigade Engineer Battalion, in Bradford
      - Company B (Combat Engineer), 572nd Brigade Engineer Battalion, in Vergennes
      - Company C (Signal), 572nd Brigade Engineer Battalion, in New London (CT) — (Connecticut Army National Guard)
      - Company D (Military Intelligence), 572nd Brigade Engineer Battalion, in Denver (CO) — (Colorado Army National Guard)
        - Detachment 1, Company D (Military Intelligence), 572nd Brigade Engineer Battalion, at Buckley Space Force Base (CO) (RQ-28A UAV)
    - 186th Brigade Support Battalion, in Northfield
      - Headquarters and Headquarters Company, 186th Brigade Support Battalion, in Northfield
      - Company A (Distribution), 186th Brigade Support Battalion, in Berlin
      - Company B (Maintenance), 186th Brigade Support Battalion, in Colchester
      - Company C (Medical), 186th Brigade Support Battalion, in Winooski
      - Company D (Forward Support), 186th Brigade Support Battalion, in Swanton — attached to 1st Squadron, 172nd Cavalry Regiment (Mountain)
      - Company E (Forward Support), 186th Brigade Support Battalion, in Hartford — attached to 572nd Brigade Engineer Battalion
        - Detachment 3, Company E (Forward Support), 186th Brigade Support Battalion, in Denver (CO) — (Colorado Army National Guard)
      - Company F (Forward Support), 186th Brigade Support Battalion, in Quincy (MA) — attached to 1st Battalion, 101st Field Artillery Regiment (Massachusetts Army National Guard)
      - Company G (Forward Support), 186th Brigade Support Battalion, in Morrisville — attached to 3rd Battalion, 172nd Infantry Regiment (Mountain)
      - Company H (Forward Support), 186th Brigade Support Battalion, in Southington (CT) — attached to 1st Battalion, 102nd Infantry Regiment (Mountain) — (Connecticut Army National Guard)
      - Company I (Forward Support), 186th Brigade Support Battalion, in Windsor (CO) — attached to 1st Battalion, 157th Infantry Regiment (Mountain) — (Colorado Army National Guard)
  - Garrison Support Command, at Camp Johnson
    - Vermont Medical Detachment, at Camp Johnson
    - 15th Civil Support Team (WMD), at Camp Johnson
    - Detachment 1 (Range Operations), Garrison Support Command, at Ethan Allen Firing Range
    - 86th Troop Command, in Williston
      - 40th Army Band, at Camp Johnson
      - 131st Judge Advocate General Trial Defense Team, in Williston
      - Detachment 2 (Critical Infrastructure Team), 136th Cyber Security Company, 126th Cyber Battalion, in Northfield (part of 91st Cyber Brigade)
      - 172nd Military Police Detachment (Law Enforcement), in Williston
      - 172nd Public Affairs Detachment, at Camp Johnson
      - Company C (MEDEVAC), 3rd Battalion (General Support Aviation), 126th Aviation Regiment, at Burlington Airport (HH-60M Black Hawk)
        - Detachment 3, Headquarters and Headquarters Company, 3rd Battalion (General Support Aviation), 126th Aviation Regiment, at Burlington Airport
        - Detachment 3, Company D (Aviation Unit Maintenance), 3rd Battalion (General Support Aviation), 126th Aviation Regiment, at Burlington Airport
        - Detachment 3, Company E (Forward Support), 3rd Battalion (General Support Aviation), 126th Aviation Regiment, at Burlington Airport
      - Detachment 1, Company D (MEDEVAC), 1st Battalion (Security & Support), 224th Aviation Regiment, at Burlington Airport (UH-72A Lakota)
      - Detachment 2, Company B, 2nd Battalion (Fixed Wing), 245th Aviation Regiment (Detachment 27, Operational Support Airlift Activity), at Burlington Airport (C-12 Huron)
  - 124th Regiment, Regional Training Institute, at Camp Johnson
    - Headquarters and Headquarters Company, at Camp Johnson
    - Army Mountain Warfare School, at Ethan Allen Firing Range
    - 2nd Battalion (Modular Training), at Camp Johnson
    - 3rd Battalion (Information Operations), at Camp Johnson

== Vermont Air National Guard units ==
The 158th Fighter Wing was formed in 1946. From 1989 to 1997, the wing was an Air Defense Unit, with aircraft on 5-minute alert, seven days a week, 24 hours a day.

Other components of the Vermont Air Guard include:

- 134th Fighter Squadron
- 158th Aircraft Generation Squadron
- 158th Civil Engineering Squadron
- 158th Communications Flight
- 158th Logistics Group
- 158th Medical Squadron
- 158th Operations Group
- 158th Operations Support Flight
- 158th Security Forces Squadron
- 158th Student Flight
- 158th Support Group
- 229th Cyber Operations Squadron

=== F-16 use ===
The Vermont Air Guard has used F-16s since 1986. On Friday November 14, 2008, they retired the longest flying Block 25 F-16C in the United States, tail number 83-1165, which will go on display in Vermont before eventually being moved to the Smithsonian Air & Space Museum.

== See also ==
- List of United States militia units in the American Revolutionary War
