= John Hudson Howland =

American politician

Member of the Vermont Senate
- In office 1975–1985

Personal details
- Born: November 14, 1915 Windsor, Vermont, U.S.
- Died: December 19, 2003 (aged 88)
- Party: Republican
- Education: Harvard College

John Hudson Howland (November 14, 1915 – December 19, 2003) was an American politician who served as a Republican member of the Vermont Senate.

== Life and career ==
Howland was born in Windsor, Vermont. He attended Harvard College.

Howland served in the Vermont Senate from 1975 to 1985.

Howland died in December 2003, at the age of 88.
