= Francis William Billado =

American attorney and Vermont National Guard general (1907–1966)

Francis W. Billado
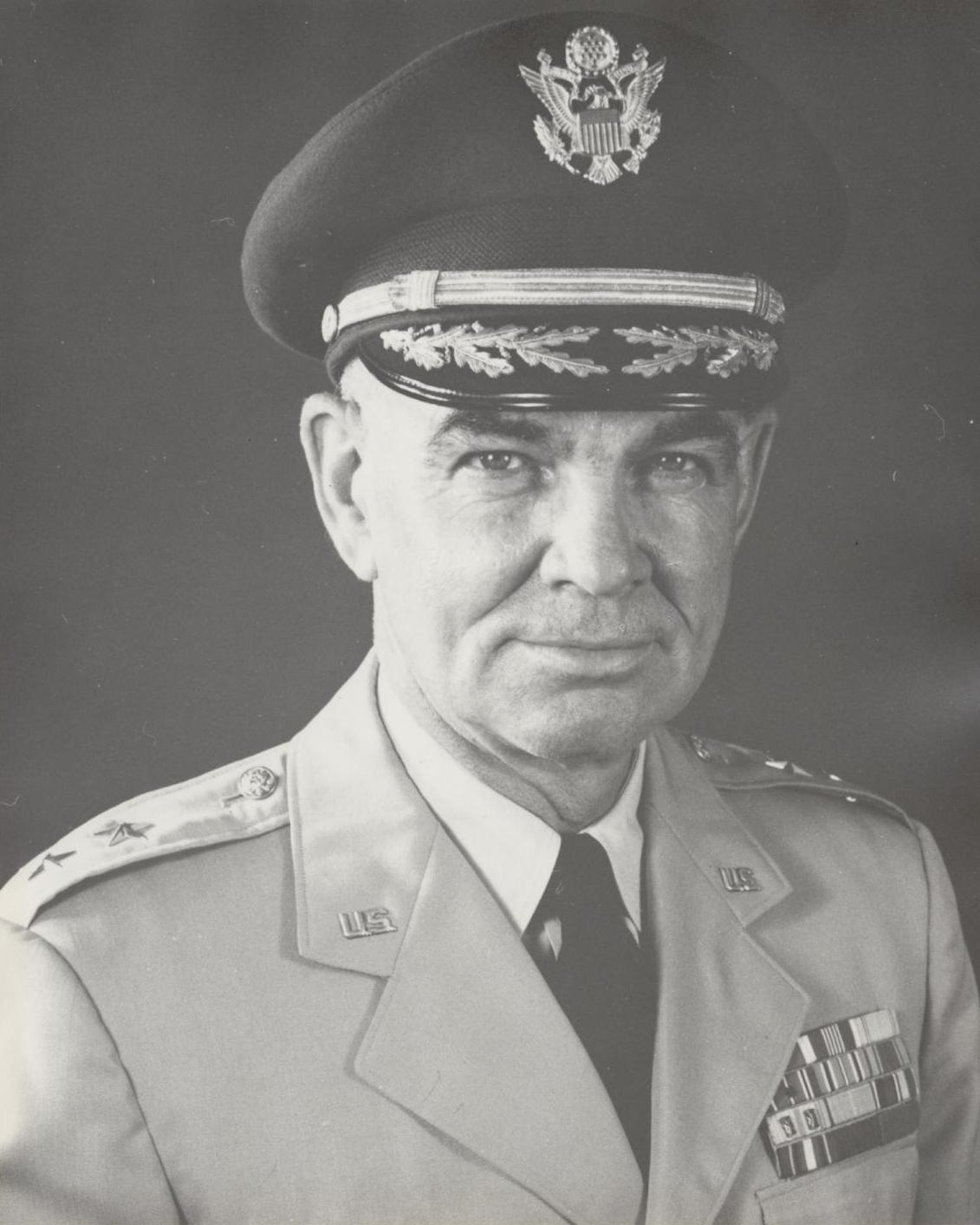
- Francis W. Billado, Vermont National Guard Adjutant General, 1955–1966.
- Born: March 3, 1907; Rutland, Vermont
- Died: September 13, 1966 (aged 59) Burlington, Vermont
- Buried: Fort Ethan Allen Cemetery; Colchester, Vermont
- Allegiance: Vermont; United States
- Branch: Vermont National Guard; United States Army
- Service years: 1923–1966
- Rank: Major General
- Commands: 1st Battalion, 172nd Infantry Regiment; Vermont National Guard
- Conflicts: World War II
- Awards: Legion of Merit
- Other work: Attorney

Francis William Billado (March 3, 1907 – September 13, 1966) was a Vermont attorney and military officer who served as Adjutant General of the Vermont National Guard.

== Early life ==
Billado was born in Rutland, Vermont, on March 3, 1907. He graduated from Norwich University in 1933, and was a member of the Theta Chi fraternity. He then studied law, attained admission to the bar, and became an attorney in Rutland.

== Start of military career ==
Billado joined the Vermont National Guard's 172nd Infantry Regiment, 43rd Infantry Division in 1923. He continued to serve during his high school and college years, and received his commission in 1933. He maintained his membership in the military after beginning his law practice.

He was mobilized for World War II and commanded 1st Battalion, 172nd Infantry Regiment. He also carried out staff assignments with the 43rd Infantry Division, War Department General Staff, I Armored Corps in the North African Campaign and Seventh United States Army during the invasion of Sicily.

== Post-World War II ==
After the war Billado returned to practicing law in Rutland. A Republican, he served in the Vermont House of Representatives in 1947, 1953, and 1955. He also served in local offices, including President of the Rutland School Board.

Billado also continued to serve in the National Guard, becoming Lieutenant Colonel and second in command of the 172nd Infantry Regiment in 1946.

Billado's military education included completion of the United States Army Command and General Staff College.

== Adjutant General ==
In 1955 the Vermont General Assembly elected Billado adjutant general. (Since the 1860s, the Vermont General Assembly elects the Adjutant General for a two-year term. At the time, elections took place in February of each odd-numbered year, and terms start in March.) He was promoted to Major General, and served until his death. Billado resided in Burlington after becoming Adjutant General.

In 1957 Billado made national headlines when he called for the firing of Secretary of Defense Charles Erwin Wilson after Wilson called the National Guard a haven for "draft dodgers" during the Korean War.

== Death and burial ==
Billado died suddenly at his home in Burlington on September 13, 1966, as the result of accidentally choking on a piece of food. He was buried in Colchester's Fort Ethan Allen Cemetery, across the road from the Vermont National Guard headquarters at Camp Johnson.

== Awards ==
Billado was a recipient of the Legion of Merit, Army Commendation Medal, and Vermont Distinguished Service Medal. In addition, he received the American Campaign Medal, American Defense Medal, World War II Victory Medal, European-African-Middle Eastern Campaign Medal with Battle Star, and Armed Forces Reserve Medal with gold and bronze hourglass devices.

=== Additional honors ===
The National Guard armory in Williston, Vermont, was named for him.

Billado was a member of the Lake Champlain Yacht Club. In his honor the club created the Billado Trophy, awarded annually to the club member whose boat finishes first on corrected time in the seasonal handicap races sailed with novice crews. The yacht club later reorganized its competitions, and four annual races were grouped together as the Billado Series.

== Family ==
In 1938 Billado married Ruth Bourquin (1908–2005). They had three children: Francis William, Barrie Lynne (Cohen), and Virginia Helen (Farrell).

Military offices
Preceded by Murdock A. Campbell	Vermont Adjutant General; 1955–1966	Succeeded by Reginald M. Cram
