= Reginald W. Buzzell =

U.S. Army brigadier general

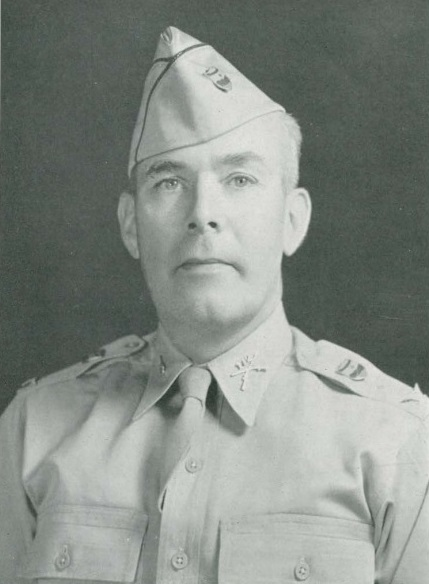
- Buzzell as commander of the 172nd Infantry Regiment in 1942
- Born: March 22, 1894; Magog, Quebec, Canada
- Died: January 23, 1959 (aged 64); Washington, D.C., U.S.
- Burial place: Park Lawn Cemetery, Bennington, Vermont
- Education: University of Vermont (attended)
- Spouse(s): Ruth M. Kipp (m. August–November 1917, her death); Josephine Start (m. 1925–1959, his death)
- Children: 3
- Military career
- Allegiance: United States; Vermont
- Branch: U.S. Army Infantry Branch
- Service years: 1914–1915; 1916–1945; 1947–1951
- Rank: Brigadier General
- Units: United States Army; Vermont Army National Guard
- Commands: Company L, 172nd Infantry Regiment; 3rd Battalion, 172nd Infantry Regiment; 172nd Infantry Regiment; Infantry Replacement Center, Camp Croft, South Carolina; Infantry Replacement Center, Camp Wheeler, Georgia; 43rd Infantry Division
- Conflicts: Pancho Villa Expedition; World War I World War II
- Other work: Postmaster, Newport, Vermont; Superintendent, Vermont Veterans Home

Reginald W. Buzzell (March 22, 1894 – January 23, 1959) was an American government official and military officer from Vermont. A longtime member of the Vermont Army National Guard, he was a veteran of the Pancho Villa Expedition, World War I and World War II and attained the rank of brigadier general.

A native of Magog, Quebec, Canada, he was raised and educated in Newport, Vermont and attended the University of Vermont. In his civilian career, Buzzell served as Newport's postmaster and superintendent of the Vermont Veterans Home in Bennington. In his military career, Buzzell served as an enlisted soldier in the Vermont Army National Guard and United States Army from 1914 to 1915 and 1916 to 1919. He attained the rank of sergeant and was a veteran of the Pancho Villa Expedition and World War I.

Buzzell received his officer's commission in 1919 and advanced through the ranks during the interwar period. As he rose in rank, Buzzell commanded Company L, 172nd Infantry Regiment, 3rd Battalion, 172nd Infantry Regiment, and the 172nd Infantry Regiment. During World War II, Buzzell commanded the regiment before receiving promotion to brigadier general and commanded the Infantry Replacement Centers at Camp Croft, South Carolina and Camp Wheeler, Georgia. In 1947, Buzzell was assigned as assistant division commander of the 43rd Infantry Division and served as acting division commander while commander Kenneth F. Cramer served as Chief of the National Guard Bureau.

In 1951, Buzzell retired from the military and his position at the veterans home. In retirement, he was a resident of Bennington. He died at Walter Reed Army Medical Center in Washington, D.C., on January 23, 1959. Buzzell was buried at Park Lawn Cemetery in Bennington.

== Biography ==
Reginald William Buzzell was born in Magog, Quebec, Canada on March 22, 1894, the son of William A. Buzzell and Harriet "Hattie" Mitson Buzzell Squires. His father died when he was six, and after his mother's remarriage, the family moved to Newport, Vermont, where Buzzell attended the local schools, including the Hillside District School. He graduated from Newport High School in 1914, and attended the University of Vermont (UVM) for a year as a member of the class of 1918. While at UVM, Buzzell studied mechanical engineering and joined the Delta Psi fraternity.

== Start of career ==
In October 1914, Buzzell began his United States Army career when he joined Company C, 1st Infantry Regiment, a unit of the Vermont Army National Guard. He served until November 1915, when he received an honorable discharge. He enlisted in Newport's Company L in March 1916, and attained the rank of sergeant. When units of the National Guard were activated for federal service during the Pancho Villa Expedition, Buzzell served with his company at Camp Shafter in Maverick County, Texas, along the Mexico–United States border. After working as a part-time letter carrier beginning in 1913, in 1916 he also began a full time career as a mail clerk and letter carrier based at the Newport post office.

== World War I ==
During World War I, Buzzell served as supply sergeant of Company G, 101st Ammunition Train, a unit of the 26th Division. The ammunition train was organized and trained at Camp Bartlett in Westfield, Massachusetts. After arrival in France in October 1917, the unit was assigned to Camp Coëtquidan in Morbihan, where duties included maintaining a fleet of trucks that transported supplies from nearby ports to the camp.

In February 1918, the 101st Ammunition Train moved to the Chemin des Dames sector, where they went into combat alongside French troops. In late March, the unit was transferred to the Toul sector. The 101st Ammunition Train participated in the Second Battle of the Marne in July, Battle of Saint-Mihiel in September, and the Meuse–Argonne offensive beginning in late September. During its combat service, the organization operated ammunition dumps and transported artillery and ammunition to front line units during fighting against the German army.

In January 1919, the 101st Ammunition Train left France for the United States. The unit was demobilized at Fort Devens, Massachusetts in April 1919, and Buzzell returned to Newport.

== Continued career ==
After the war, Buzzell returned to his job at the Newport post office. In November 1919, the post-war reconstitution of the National Guard included the reorganization of Newport's local unit as Company L, 172nd Infantry Regiment. In December, Company L's soldiers chose Buzzell to serve as their commander, and he received his commission as a captain. Buzzell also became active in founding Newport's American Legion post, and served as its adjutant.

In 1921, Buzzell took part in the planning and construction of a new National Guard armory in Newport. In August 1921, Buzzell was promoted to major and assigned to command the 172nd Infantry's 3rd Battalion. In December 1921, Marshal Ferdinand Foch, commander of French forces during the First World War, was aboard a Quebec-bound train that stopped in Brattleboro, Vermont to change engines. Governor James Hartness arranged for a reception in Foch's honor to take place while the engines were changed, and Buzzell was a member of Hartness's official party.

In 1924, Buzzell graduated from the United States Army Command and General Staff College at Fort Leavenworth, Kansas. In May 1924, he was appointed as Newport's postmaster. In November, he was elected commander of the American Legion post in Newport. When Clarence Ransom Edwards, the World War I commander of the 26th Division, was honored for his wartime leadership at a 1926 reception in St. Johnsbury, Vermont, Buzzell was among the guests of honor. In February 1932, Buzzell completed the Army's course for National Guard field grade officers at Fort Benning, Georgia. In February 1933, he was promoted to lieutenant colonel and assigned as executive officer of the 172nd Infantry Regiment.

Buzzell's term as postmaster expired in 1936 and after his successor took office, Buzzell continued to work as a clerk at the Newport post office. In July 1937, he was elected by the board of trustees to serve as superintendent of the Vermont Veterans Home in Bennington, and he moved from Newport to Bennington. At the same time Buzzell was elected, his wife, a registered nurse, was elected to serve as the home's matron. In May 1938, the officers of the 172nd Infantry Regiment elected Buzzell as commander with the rank of colonel, succeeding Leonard F. Wing, and the appointment became effective in July.

== World War II ==
In March 1941, the 172nd Infantry Regiment was activated for federal service in anticipation of U.S. entry into World War II. Buzzell led the regiment during its training at: Camp Blanding, Florida; Camp Shelby, Mississippi; and Fort Polk, Louisiana. He was in command during the 172nd's participation in the Louisiana Maneuvers and Carolina Maneuvers.

In August 1942, Buzzell was promoted to brigadier general and assigned as assistant commander of the Infantry Replacement Center at Camp Croft, South Carolina, of which he later became commander. He subsequently commanded the Infantry Replacement Center at Camp Wheeler, Georgia. Buzzell was responsible for providing basic training and infantry-specific training to new soldiers prior to their departure for service in overseas combat theaters, and he remained in command at Camp Wheeler until the end of the war. During the military's post-war demobilization, Major General Thomas G. Hearn was assigned to command Camp Wheeler, and Buzzell served as his deputy. He retired from the Army in October 1945, and returned to Vermont.

== Later life ==
In January 1946, Buzzell resumed working as superintendent of the Vermont Veterans Home. His wife, who had traveled with him during his wartime service, resumed working as the home's matron.

In February 1947, Buzzell was appointed as a brigadier general in the National Guard and assigned as assistant division commander of the 43rd Infantry Division. Buzzell served as acting division commander while commander Kenneth F. Cramer served in Washington, D.C., as Chief of the National Guard Bureau. In February 1950, Buzzell was involved in an auto accident while en route to Fort Totten, New York. When the 43rd Division was activated for federal service during the Korean War, Buzzell was medically unable to serve because he was still convalescing from his injuries. He resigned from the Vermont Veterans Home in May 1951, and he retired from the military for the second time in August 1951.

In retirement, Buzzell continued to reside in Bennington. In October 1958, he became ill and was admitted to Walter Reed Army Medical Center for treatment. Buzzell did not recover, and died at Walter Reed on January 23, 1959. Buzzell was buried at Park Lawn Cemetery in Bennington. After his death, Buzzell's family donated several of his uniform items, including caps and jackets, to the Bennington Museum.

== Family ==
In August 1917, Buzzell married Ruth M. Kipp. She contracted an illness soon after the wedding, which was diagnosed as typhoid. She died in Newport in November 1917. In August 1925, Buzzell married Josephine Start (1901–1999) of Scotstown, Quebec. With his second wife, Buzzell was the father of daughter Elizabeth (1926–1996) and sons William (1928–2018) and David (1932–2015).
