= 86th Field Artillery Regiment =

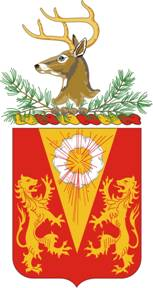
- Coat of arms
- Active: 1947–2010
- Country: United States
- Allegiance: Vermont
- Branch: Vermont Army National Guard
- Type: Field artillery
- Motto: Hic Murus Aheneus (This Is A Brazen Wall)

Insignia
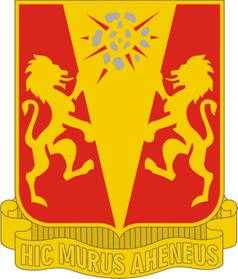
- Distinctive unit insignia

The 86th Field Artillery Regiment is a inactive parent field artillery regiment of the United States Army, last represented in the Vermont Army National Guard by the 1st Battalion, 86th Field Artillery Regiment. Perpetuating the Vermont Light Artillery Batteries of the American Civil War and subsequent Vermont artillery units, the regiment was organized following World War II as the 206th Field Artillery Battalion in the Vermont National Guard. The 206th saw active service in Germany with the 43rd Infantry Division during the Korean War, and became the 124th Artillery, a Combat Arms Regimental System parent regiment, in 1959. Represented by the 1st Howitzer Battalion, 124th Artillery, the regiment was renumbered as the 86th Artillery in 1964 when the 1st Battalion became the brigade artillery battalion of the 86th Armored Brigade. The 1st Battalion served in that role with the brigade for much of the rest of its existence.

== History ==
=== Origins ===
The 86th Field Artillery traced its lineage back to the 1st, 2nd, and 3rd Vermont Light Artillery Batteries of the American Civil War. Artillery returned to the Vermont Volunteer Militia on 22 November 1867 when a three-section light artillery battery headquartered at Springfield was organized. The volunteer militia battery was reduced to a section at Northfield known as the Norwich Cadets, composed of Norwich University students, on 27 November 1872. The Vermont Light Battery was reorganized on 11 April 1877 at Brattleboro, including the Norwich Cadets. The volunteer militia became the Vermont National Guard in 1894 and on 10 August 1899 the battery was disbanded. The Norwich Cadets continued as a battery and on 19 November 1907 expanded into Battery A, Light Artillery, and Company A, Signal Corps. Both units were converted into the 1st Squadron, 1st Cavalry on 1 January 1911. The squadron was mustered into Federal service on 24 June 1916 at Fort Ethan Allen when the National Guard was mobilized for duty on the Mexican border to replace Federal troops sent on the Pancho Villa Expedition. The squadron did not leave for the border as it was disbanded at Fort Ethan Allen less than a month later on 19 July. In the same year, the Norwich Cadets ceased being part of the National Guard and became a Reserve Officers' Training Corps unit.

=== 206th Field Artillery Battalion ===
The lineage of the Vermont Light Battery continued when it was reconstituted in the Vermont National Guard on 3 July 1946 as the 206th Field Artillery Battalion, part of the 43rd Infantry Division. The 206th, the first Vermont National Guard artillery unit since 1911, and the 172nd Infantry Regiment made up the bulk of the Vermont Army National Guard and were its only combat units in the early postwar period. The 206th received the heraldry of the 251st Field Artillery Battalion, which had served in the Pacific during World War II, although it did not perpetuate the lineage of the 251st. The headquarters and headquarters battery of the 206th at Burlington was organized and Federally recognized on 3 April 1947. In the following months, the rest of the battalion was organized and Federally recognized: Service Battery at Winooski on 16 April, Battery B at Essex Junction on 21 July, Battery A and the Medical Detachment at Waterbury on 13 November, and Battery C at Rutland on 14 November. In early June the 206th saw their first state call-up to maintain order after Rutland was struck by a flood, and in early August headquarters and headquarters and service batteries attended their first two-week annual training at Camp Johnson. Like much of the Vermont Army National Guard, the 206th was significantly understrength and by mid-1950 totalled 297 officers and men. The unit participated in annual training with the other Vermont units of the 43rd Division during August at Camp Edwards, Massachusetts in 1948 and 1949.

It was ordered into active Federal service on 5 September 1950 during the Korean War with the rest of the 43rd. The 206th went to Germany with the division and when the active service term of its Guardsmen ended they returned to Vermont, forming the 206th Field Artillery Battalion in the replacement National Guard of the United States (NGUS). The NGUS unit was organized and Federally recognized on 30 December 1952, headquartered at Fort Ethan Allen. The 43rd units in Germany were reflagged as units of the 5th Infantry Division after the last of the Guardsmen returned to the United States, with the 206th becoming the 50th Field Artillery Battalion on 15 June 1954. The 206th continued as part of the Vermont National Guard and on 1 January 1955 its headquarters location was changed to Winooski.

=== 1st Battalion, 86th Field Artillery ===
When the Combat Arms Regimental System was introduced, the 206th was reorganized and redesignated as the 124th Artillery on 1 March 1959. It thus became a parent regiment represented by the 1st Howitzer Battalion, 124th Artillery, which continued as part of the 43rd. When the division was inactivated during a reorganization of the National Guard, the regiment was renumbered as the 86th Artillery on 1 February 1964 with the 1st Howitzer Battalion becoming the 1st Battalion, 86th Artillery. The latter was part of the 86th Armored Brigade, formed from the Vermont units of the 43rd. By 1966, Headquarters Battery was located at Williston, Battery A at Waterbury, Battery B at Vergennes, and Battery C at Northfield. The brigade joined the 50th Armored Division on 1 February 1968 during another National Guard reorganization, but on 1 June 1975 the battalion became a nondivisional unit. The battalion rejoined the 86th Brigade on 1 May 1980. It formed part of the 86th Brigade of the 50th Armored together with the 1st and 2nd Battalions of the 172nd Armor during this period. The battalion transferred with the brigade to the 26th Infantry Division on 1 June 1988. The regiment continued in existence as a parent regiment when the United States Army Regimental System was introduced for the National Guard on 1 May 1989. When the 26th was inactivated on 1 September 1993, the 1st Battalion remained as the artillery battalion of the brigade.

Roughly half of the 1st Battalion, 86th Field Artillery, 193 personnel, were mobilized for active duty in January 2004 as Task Force Redleg. With their M109A5 155 mm self-propelled howitzers redundant for counterinsurgency warfare, the detachment of the battalion received six weeks of military police training at Fort Dix and arrived in Iraq in March. They served on convoy escort duty in southern Iraq under the control of the 16th Military Police Brigade. On 25 May two soldiers of the detachment were killed in a mortar attack on Forward Operating Base Kalsu. The 1st Battalion detachment lost three killed in action, one died of natural causes, and 22 wounded during the nearly yearlong deployment. The 16th Military Police Brigade and its attached units were awarded the Meritorious Unit Commendation in recognition of their actions. After the detachment returned to Vermont in February 2005, the battalion reequipped with 105 mm towed howitzers after the 2006 annual training.

The 1st Battalion was inactivated in 2010.

== Heraldry ==
=== Distinctive unit insignia ===
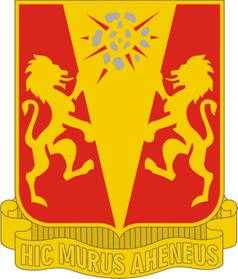

- Description

A Gold color metal and enamel device 1 1/16 inches (2.70 cm) in height overall consisting of a shield blazoned: Gules on a pile Or, between two lions rampant respecting each other of the last a shellburst Proper. Attached below the shield a Gold scroll inscribed “HIC MURUS AHENEUS” in base metal.

- Symbolism

The scarlet is for the Artillery. The gold pile is representative of the entering wedge driven into enemy territory by the fire of the organization, which is illustrated by the shellburst. The motto: “Hic Murus Aheneus” (This is a brazen wall), alludes to the “brazen wall formed by artillery barrage,” (i.e., “curtain of fire”).

- Background

The distinctive unit insignia was originally approved for the 251st Field Artillery Battalion on 24 February 1943. It was redesignated for the 206th Field Artillery Battalion on 17 March 1947. It was redesignated for the 124th Artillery Regiment on 18 July 1961. The insignia was redesignated for the 86th Artillery Regiment and amended to revise the symbolism on 2 October 1970. It was redesignated for the 86th Field Artillery Regiment on 11 July 1972.

=== Coat of arms ===
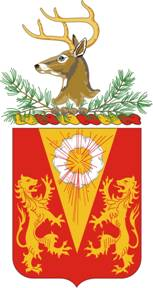

- Blazon
  - Shield: Gules on a pile Or, between two lions rampant respecting each other of the last a shellburst Proper.
  - Crest: That for the regiments and separate battalions of the Vermont Army National Guard: On a wreath of the colors Or and Gules a buck’s head erased within a garland of pine all Proper.
  - Motto: HIC MURUS AHENEUS (This Is A Brazen Wall).
- Symbolism
  - Shield: The scarlet is for the Artillery. The gold pile is representative of the entering wedge driven into enemy territory by the fire of the organization, which is illustrated by the shellburst. The motto: “Hic Murus Aheneus” (This is a brazen wall), alludes to the “brazen wall formed by artillery barrage,” (i.e., “curtain of fire”).
  - Crest: The crest is that of the Vermont Army National Guard.
- Background: The coat of arms was originally approved for the 251st Field Artillery Battalion on 24 February 1943. It was redesignated for the 206th Field Artillery Battalion with the addition of the Vermont Army National Guard crest on 17 March 1947. It was redesignated for the 124th Artillery Regiment on 18 July 1961. The insignia was redesignated for the 86th Artillery Regiment and amended to revise the symbolism on 2 October 1970. It was redesignated for the 86th Field Artillery Regiment on 11 July 1972
