= Leonard F. Wing =

United States Army general (1893–1945)

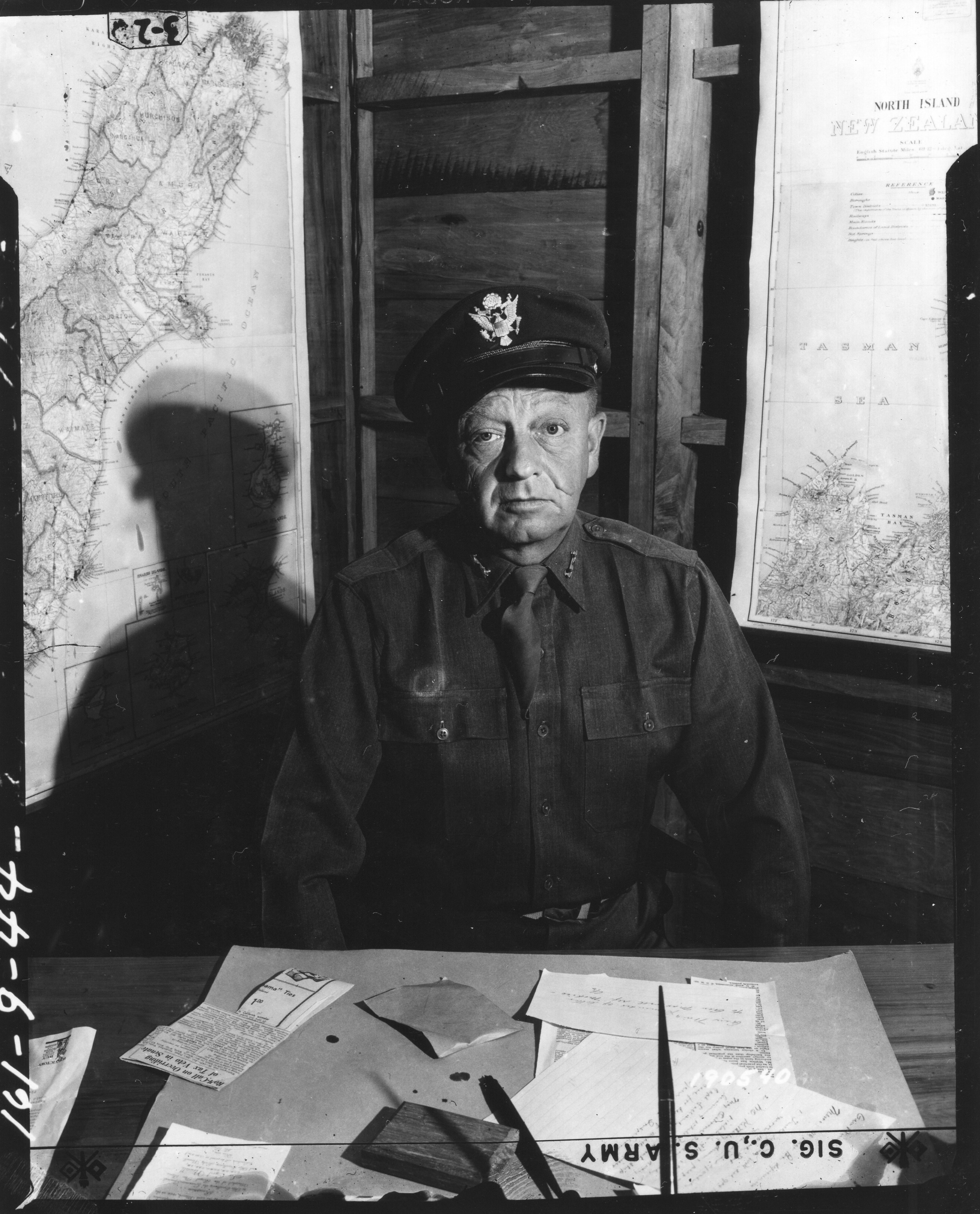
- Wing as 43rd Infantry Division commander c. March 1944
- Born: November 12, 1893; Ira, Vermont, US
- Died: December 19, 1945 (aged 52); Rutland, Vermont, US
- Military career
- Allegiance: United States
- Branch: United States Army
- Service years: 1918–1945
- Rank: Major general
- Nickname: "Red"
- Commands: 172nd Infantry Regiment; 86th Infantry Brigade; 68th Field Artillery Brigade; 43rd Infantry Division ("Winged Victory")
- Conflicts: World War I; World War II; Asiatic-Pacific Theater
- Awards: Distinguished Service Medal; Silver Star; Legion of Merit; Bronze Star; Presidential Unit Citation; Philippine Presidential Unit Citation
- Other work: Attorney; Judge; Chairman, Vermont Republican Party; Executive Assistant, Governor Stanley C. Wilson

Leonard Fish Wing Sr. (November 12, 1893 – December 19, 1945), nicknamed "Red", was a Vermont political figure and a division commander in the United States Army during World War II.

== Early life ==
Leonard Wing was born in Ira, Vermont on November 12, 1893, the son of David E. and Dora (Fish) Wing. He attended the schools of Ira and Middletown, and his family moved to Rutland in 1908. He graduated from Rutland High School in 1914, and then attended Norwich University. Afterwards Wing studied law with the Rutland firm of Lawrence, Lawrence and Stafford, and he attained admission to the bar in 1917.

== World War I military service ==
Wing enlisted in the Army for World War I, and served at Fort Ethan Allen, Vermont, Fort Gordon, Georgia, and Fort Dix, New Jersey. He completed officer training, received a commission and attained the rank of first lieutenant. He served as the supply officer for the 2nd Infantry Replacement Regiment until the end of the war, and was discharged at Fort Dix in December, 1918.

== Post-World War I ==
After his discharge Wing returned to Rutland and established a law practice. From 1919 to 1921 he served as Rutland City Attorney, and he was Rutland's City Judge from 1921 to 1925.

Wing was active in Republican party politics, and served on the state Republican Committee, of which he was chairman from 1925 to 1929. He also attended numerous state and national party conventions, including serving as a delegate to the 1940 Republican national convention.

In 1919 Wing joined the Vermont National Guard's 172nd Infantry Regiment as a second lieutenant. He rose through the ranks and in 1933 received promotion to colonel as the 172nd's commander. That year he earned statewide praise from business owners and condemnation from laborers after leading his regiment to break a strike of Barre granite workers.

In 1933 Wing was named executive assistant to Governor Stanley C. Wilson, serving until the end of Wilson's term in 1935.

Wing was promoted to brigadier general in 1937 as commander of the 86th Infantry Brigade, at the time a subordinate command of the New England based 43rd Infantry Division. He was succeeded as regimental commander by Reginald W. Buzzell, who had been his executive officer.

In 1939 Wing was elected to the Norwich University Board of Trustees.

== World War II ==
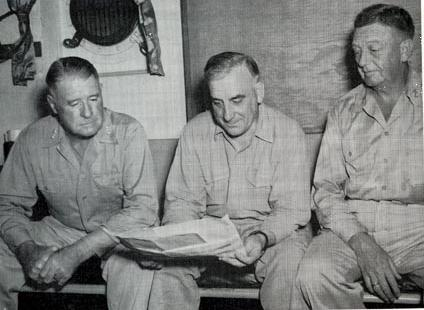
From left to right – I Corps Commander Major General Innis P. Swift, Vice Admiral Daniel E. Barbey, Commander 7th Amphibious Force, Major General Leonard F. Wing, Commander, 43rd Division. January 3, 1945, aboard USS Blue Ridge.

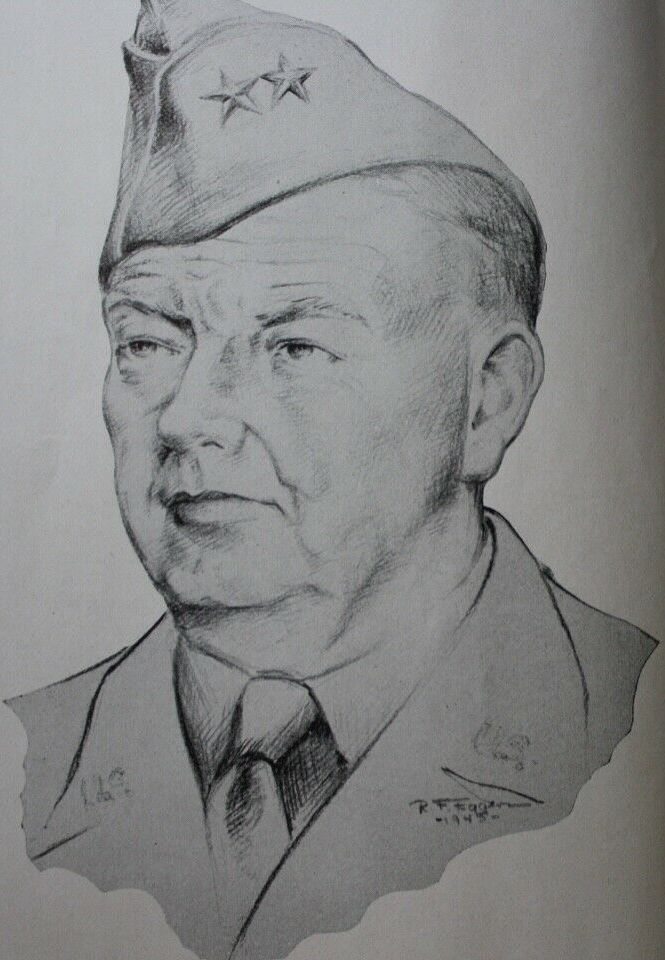
Frontispiece of 1946's Winged Victory: The Story of the 43d Infantry Division, 1941-1945

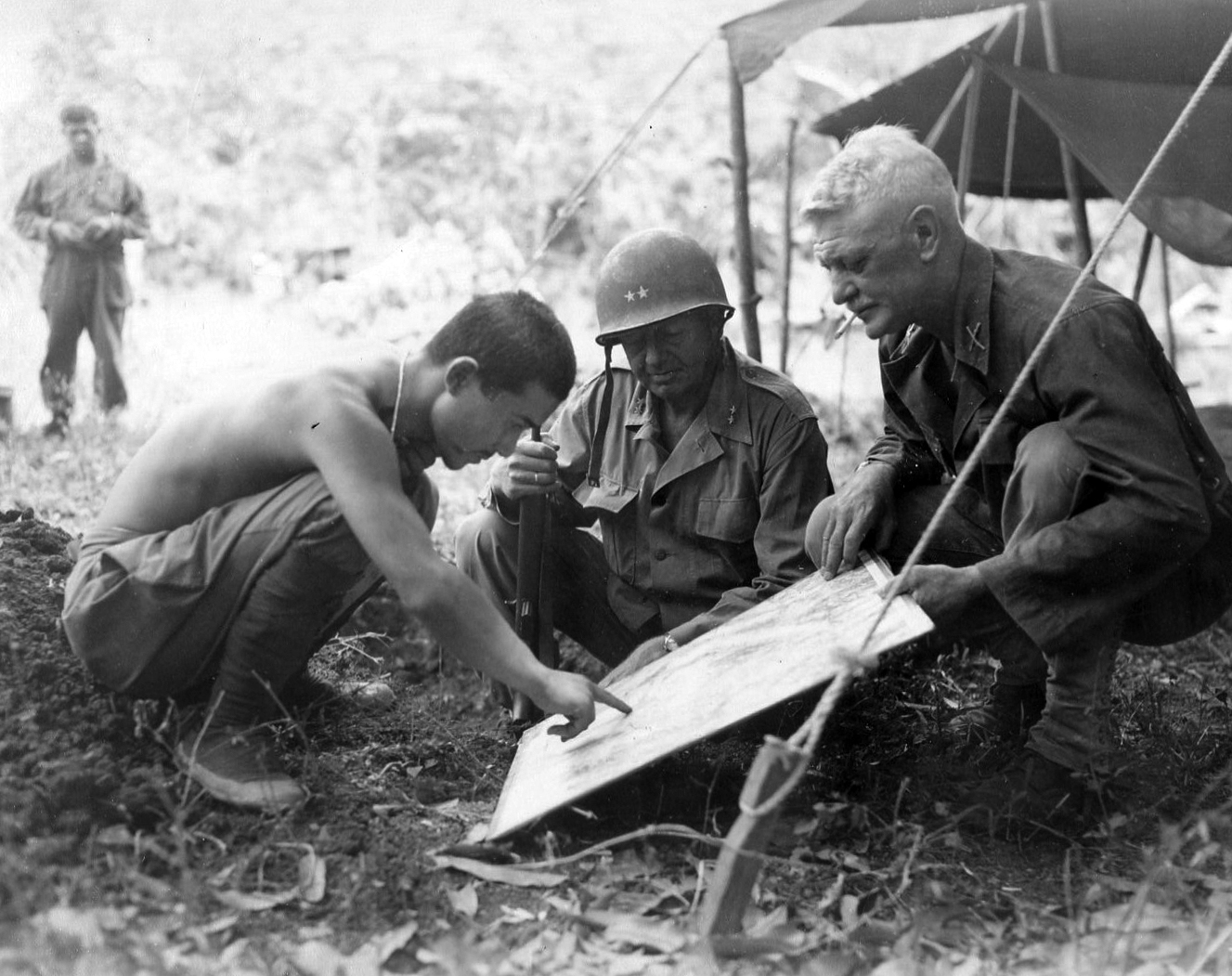
A Japanese mortarman captured by the 103d Infantry on Luzon points out Japanese positions to Major General Leonard P. Wing (center) and Colonel Joseph P. Cleland, March 17, 1945

In 1941 the 43rd Division mobilized for service in the Pacific Theater. In 1942, Wing was named commander of the division's 68th Field Artillery Brigade, and later that year he was appointed the 43rd's Assistant Division Commander. Wing became commander of the division as a major general in 1943, replacing Major General John H. Hester. Wing successfully rebuffed attempts to replace him with a Regular Army officer, as was done in most divisions, making him one of three National Guard officers to command combat divisions in World War II. The other National Guard officers who commanded combat divisions, Robert S. Beightler of the 37th Infantry Division and Raymond S. McLain of the 90th Infantry Division, received commissions in the Regular Army immediately after the war, which is likely the source of the claim that Wing was the only National Guard officer to command a combat division in World War II. Wing's success at keeping his command was especially noteworthy because he had been diagnosed with heart disease, and could have asked to be relieved on medical grounds.

The 43rd Division, named "Winged Victory" in honor of its commander, saw action at Guadalcanal, Rendova, New Georgia, New Guinea and Luzon. It played a vital role in the capture of the Ipo Dam outside Manila, Philippines, taking the city's main water source intact and breaking Japanese resistance, an action for which it received the U.S. Presidential Unit Citation and the Philippine Presidential Unit Citation.

The 43rd Division served on occupation duty in Japan before being deactivated in October, 1945.

== Post-World War II ==
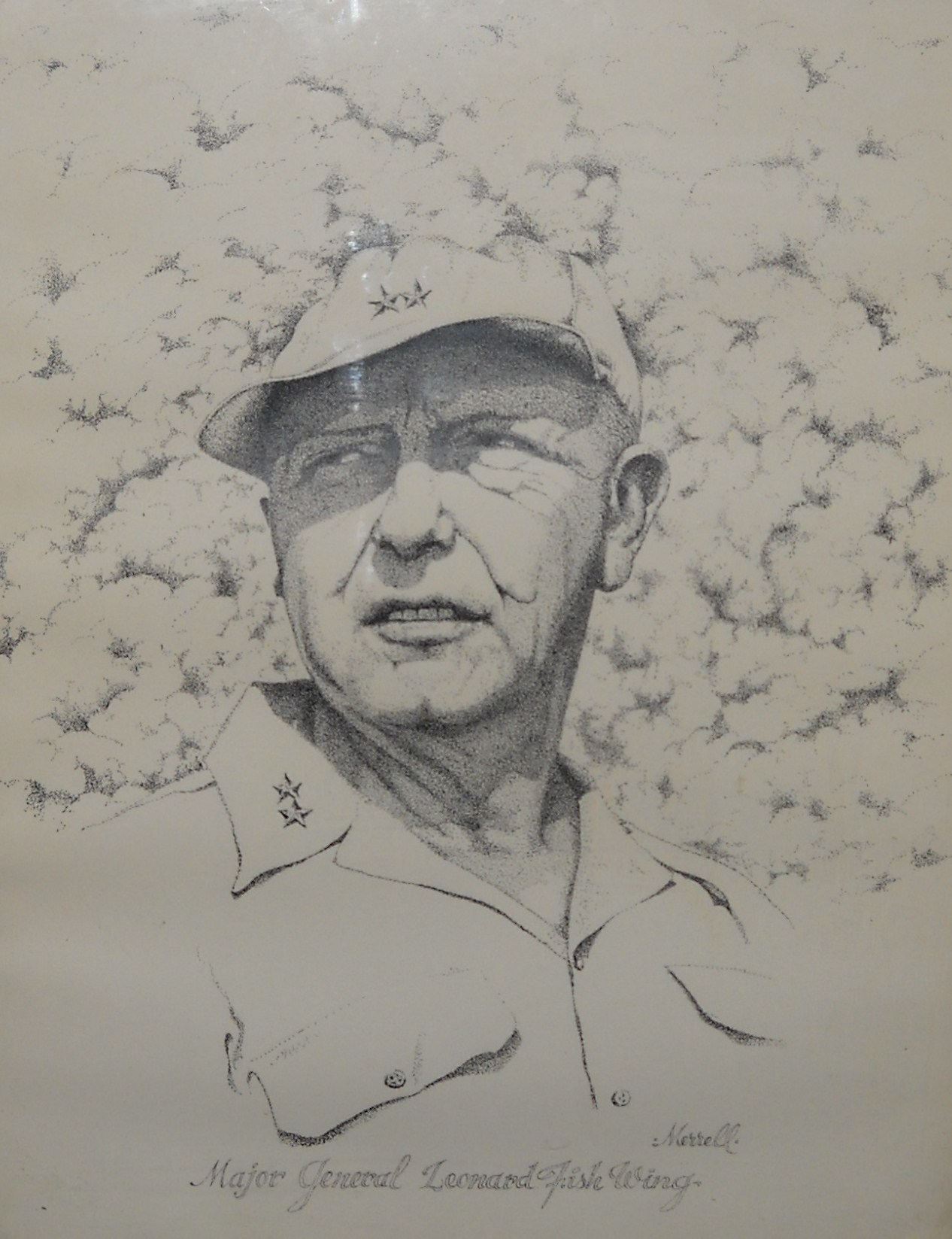
Drawing of Wing displayed at Headquarters, 3rd Battalion 172nd Infantry, Vermont National Guard, Jericho, Vermont.

After returning home at the end of 1945, Wing spent time in the hospital to recuperate from pneumonia and other ailments. He took part in victory parades throughout New England in November and December, and was elected President of the Vermont Bar Association. He was considered a likely candidate for governor, and if incumbent Mortimer Proctor adhered to tradition and left office after one term, Wing would likely have won the Republican nomination. In a state where only Republicans held statewide office from the 1850s to the 1960s, Wing would almost certainly have been elected governor in 1946.

== Death and political ramifications ==
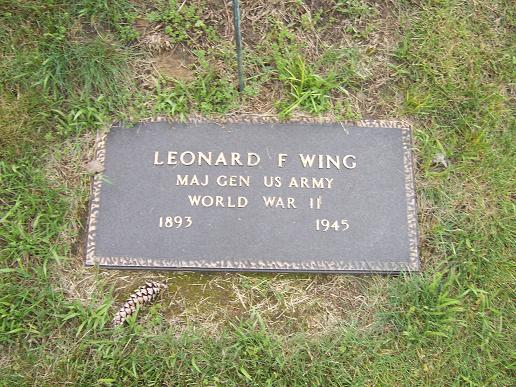
Bronze military grave marker, Leonard F. Wing

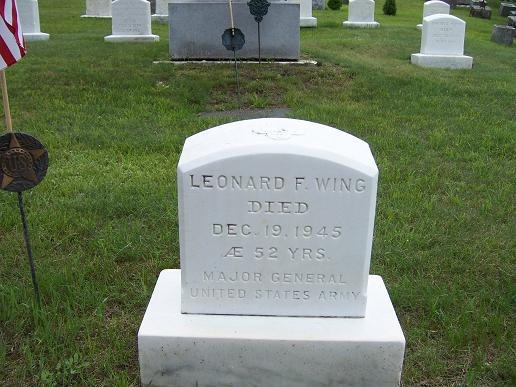
Individual grave marker, Leonard F. Wing

Wing's plans to run for governor were ended when he died of a heart attack at his home in Rutland on December 19, 1945. He was buried in Rutland's Evergreen Cemetery.

As a result of Wing's death, Ernest W. Gibson Jr., an officer on Wing's staff during the war, ran for the Republican nomination, defeated Governor Proctor, and won the 1946 general election.

== Awards and honors ==
General Wing's military awards and decorations included the Distinguished Service Medal, Silver Star, Legion of Merit, and Bronze Star.

Norwich University awarded Wing honorary Master of Science (1938) and Master of Military Science (1946) degrees.

== Personal ==
Leonard F. Wing was married twice. In 1919 he married Bernice Kidder (1894–1923), with whom he had a son. In 1924 Wing married Margaret Dorothy Clark (or Clarke) (1897–1960), with whom he had a son and a daughter.

Leonard F. Wing, Jr. (1923–2005), also a Norwich University graduate, and World War II veteran who was taken prisoner by the Germans and later escaped. He became a prominent attorney who served as President of the Vermont Bar Association. The younger Leonard Wing served in the Vermont National Guard, attaining the rank of brigadier general as commander of the 86th Armored Brigade in the late 1960s. In 1991 he endowed the Major General Leonard F. Wing Scholarship at Norwich University.

Bruce Clark Wing was born in Rutland on February 5, 1925, and died in Rutland on May 11, 2000.

Patricia Margaret Wing was born in Rutland in 1926.

The Wing family remained prominent in Vermont legal circles, including Leonard Wing, Jr.'s daughter, Joan Loring Wing, (1948–2009), an attorney in Rutland who served as President of the Vermont Bar Association.

Military offices
Preceded by John R. Hodge	Commanding General 43rd Infantry Division; 1943–1945	Succeeded by Post deactivated
