= 86th Infantry Brigade Combat Team =

US Army National Guard light infantry brigade

86th Infantry Brigade Combat Team (Mountain)
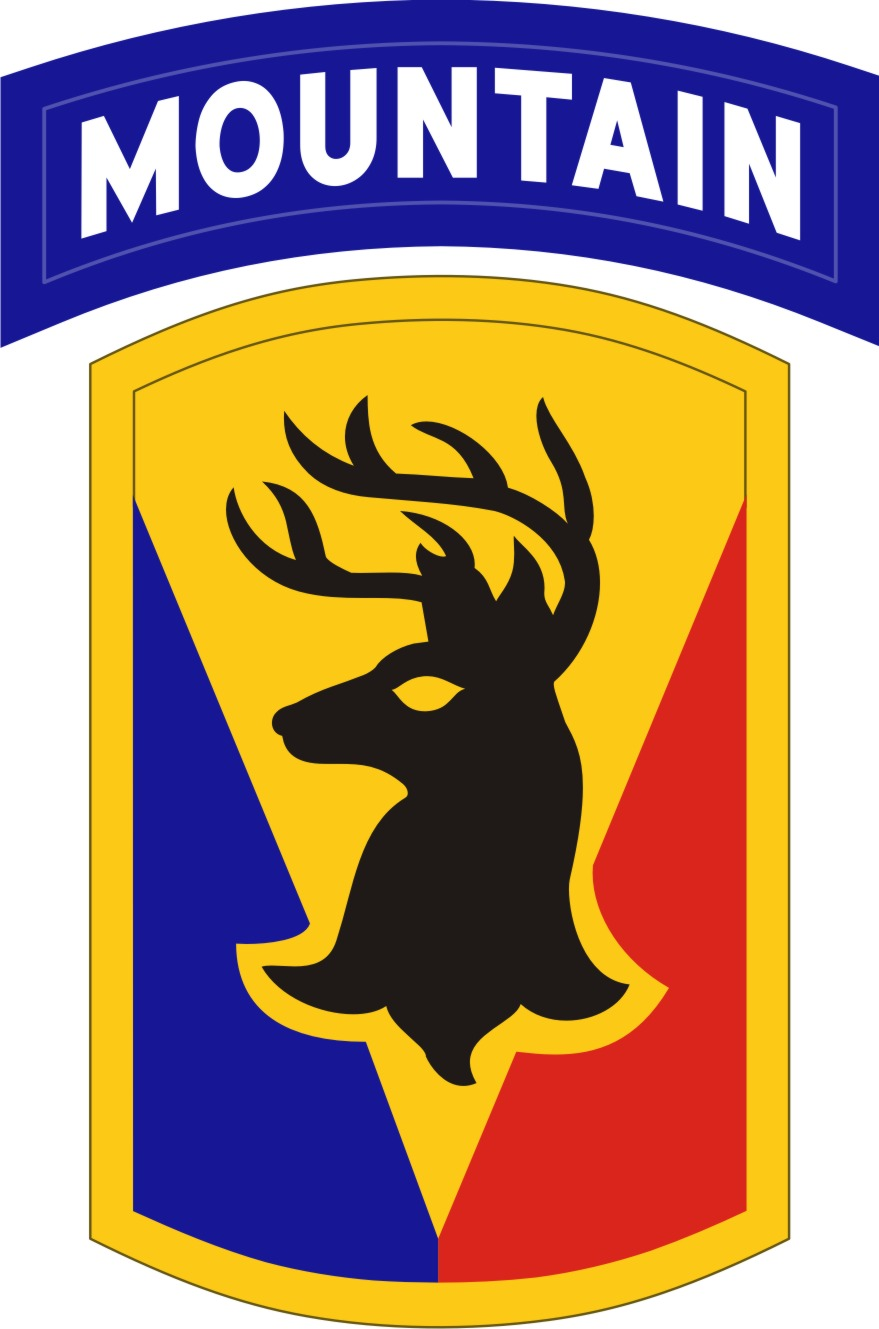
- 86th IBCT's shoulder sleeve insignia
- Active: 17 June 1878–22 June 1916 (Vermont Volunteer Militia); 22 June 1916–3 May 1919 (57th Pioneer Infantry Co.); 30 June 1921–1 November 1945 (Service Co. 172d Inf. Regt.); 29 January 1947–1 April 1963 (HHC 172d Inf. Regt.); 1 April 1963–1 February 1964 (86th Inf. Bge.); 1 February 1964–1 September 1993 (86th Armored Bge.); 1 September 1993–2006; 2006–present (86th BCT)
- Country: United States
- Allegiance: Vermont
- Branch: United States Army; United States Army National Guard
- Type: Mountain Infantry
- Size: Brigade
- Part of: Vermont Army National Guard; 42nd Infantry Division (United States)
- Nickname: The Vermont Brigade (special designation)
- Anniversaries: 30 June 1921
- Engagements: World War I (57th Pioneer Infantry Co.); Champagne-Marne; Aisne-Marne; St. Mihiel; Meuse-Argonne; Ile de France 1918; Lorraine 1918; World War II (Service Co. 172d Inf. Regt.); New Guinea; Northern Solomons with arrowhead; Luzon with arrowhead
- Decorations: Philippine Presidential Unit Citation, Streamer embroidered 17 October 1944 to 4 July 1945 (Headquarters and Headquarters Company)

Commanders
- Current commander: Colonel Frank A. Tantillo (since September 2024)
- Notable commanders: Leonard F. Wing; Wayne H. Page; Bruce M. Lawlor; Thomas E. Drew

Insignia
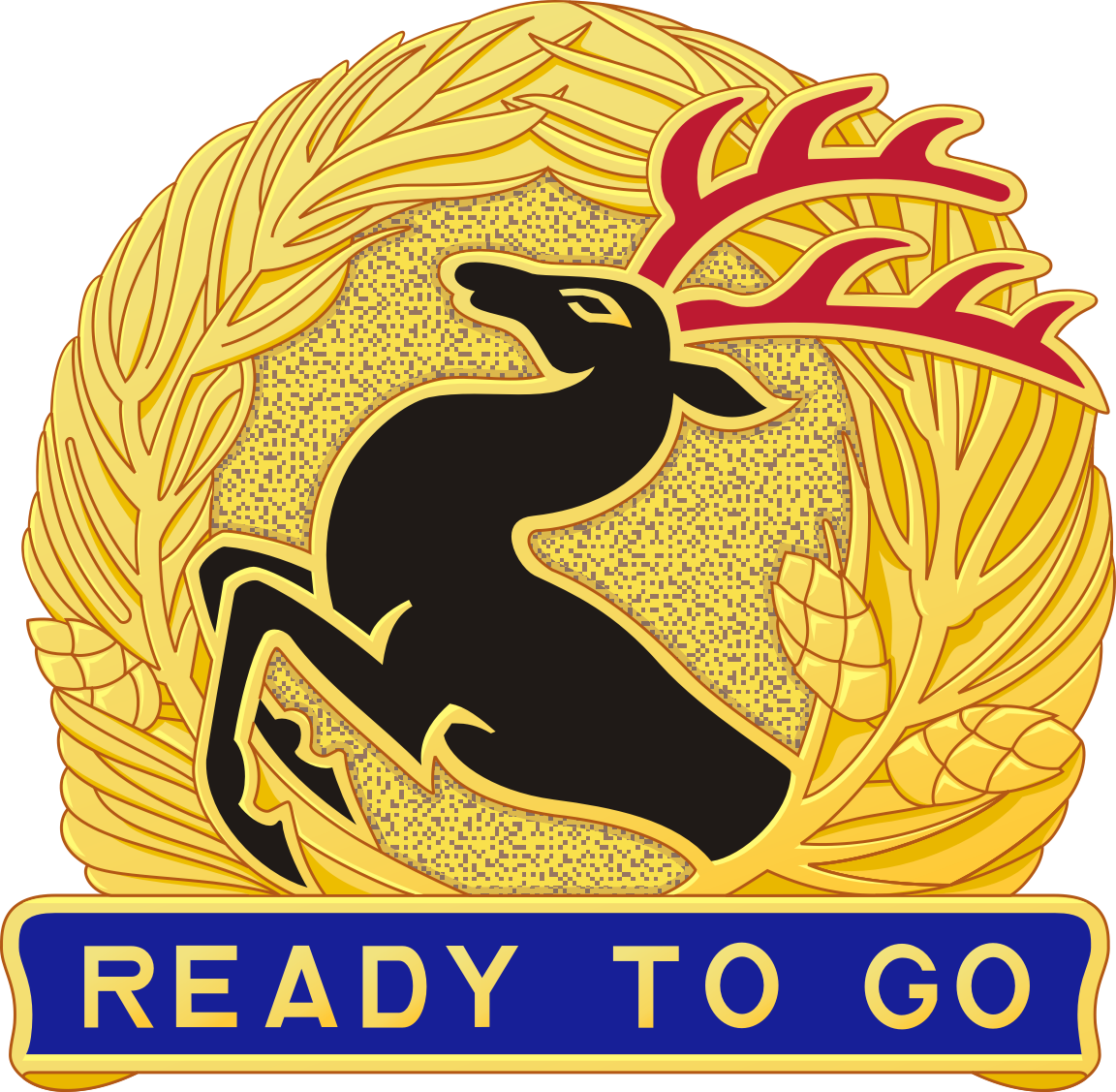
- The brigade's distinctive unit insignia

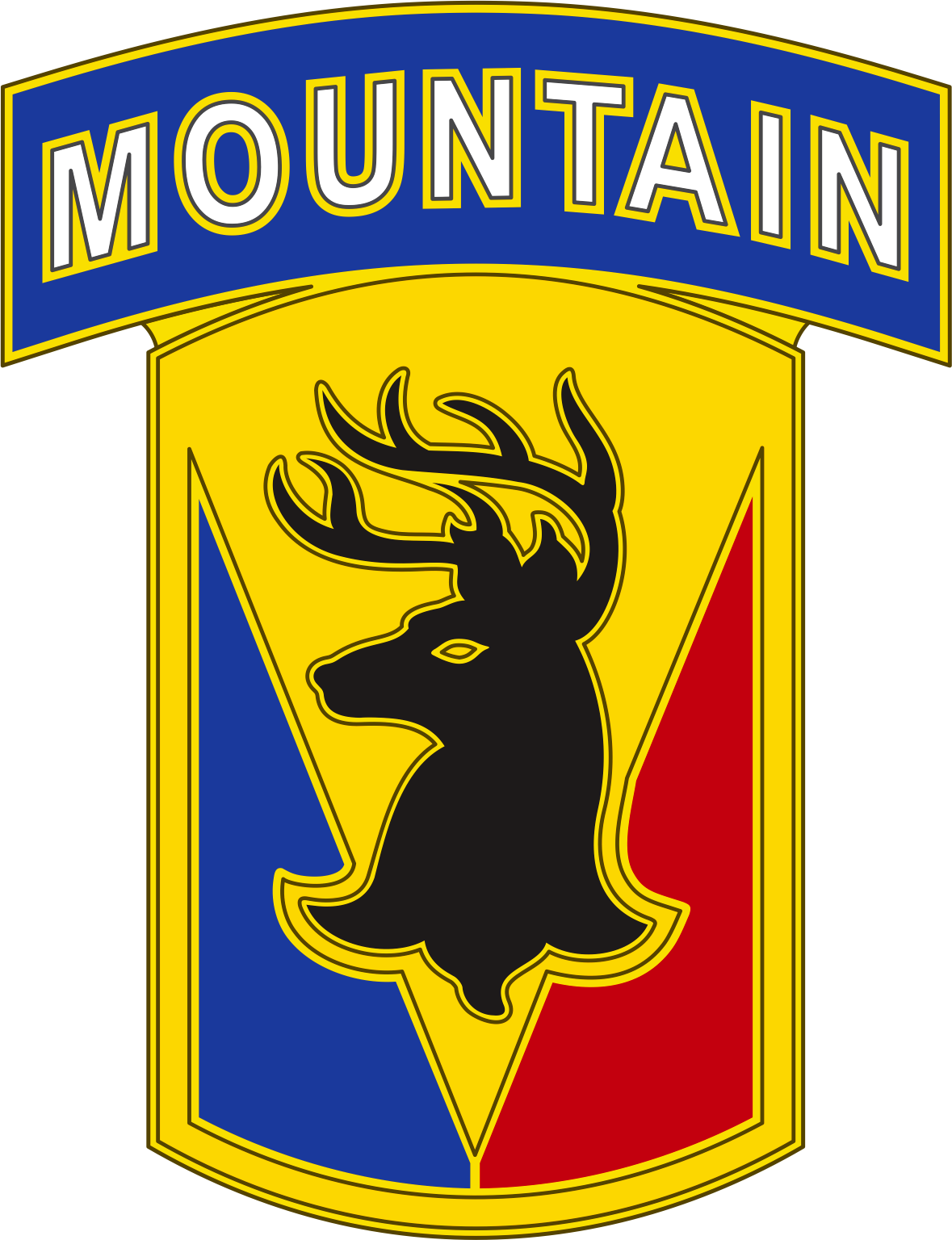
- Combat service identification badge (CSIB)

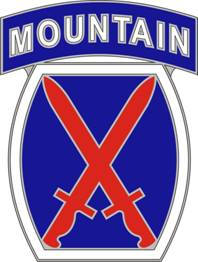
- Former CSIB

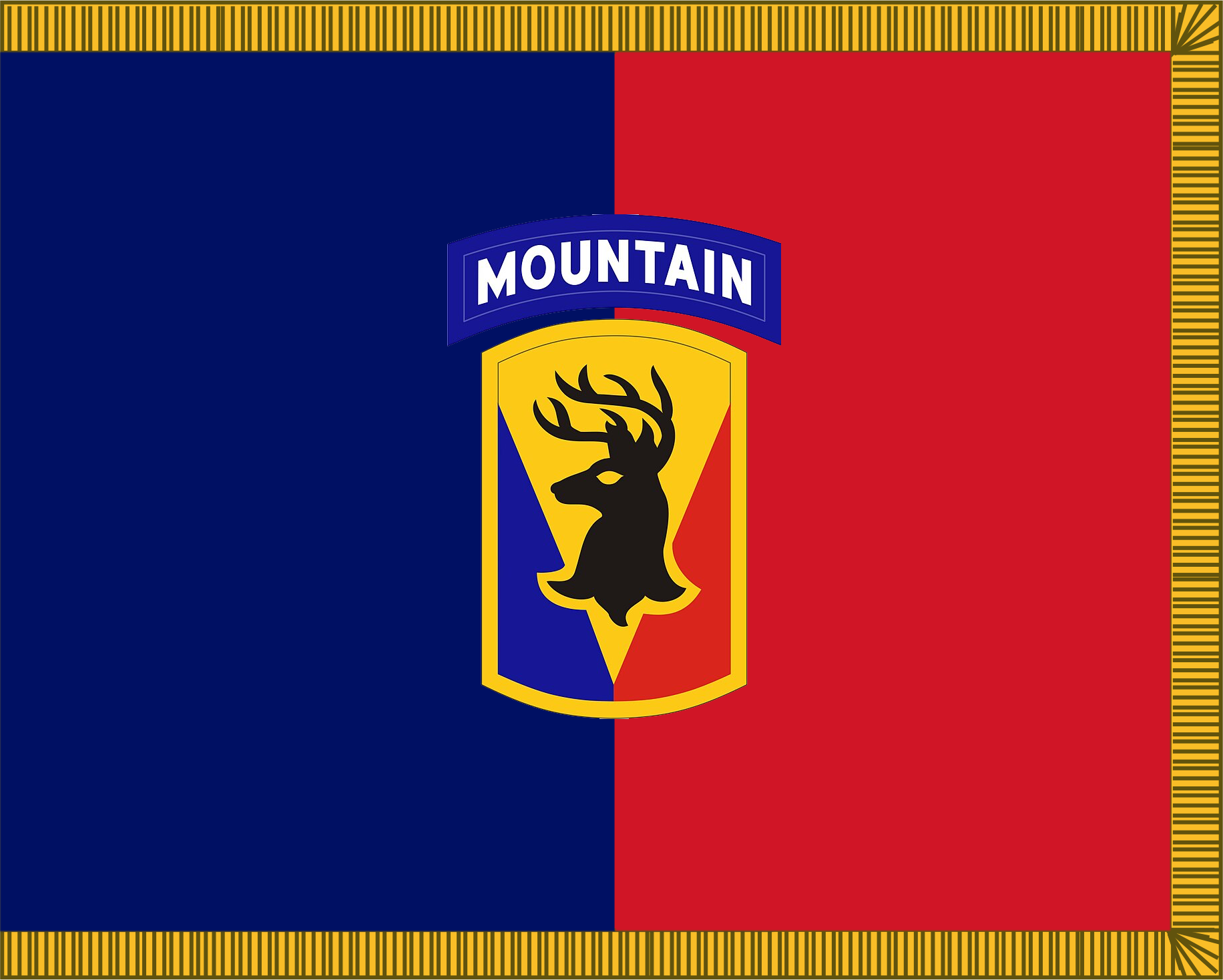
- 86th Infantry Brigade Combat Team Flag

The 86th Infantry Brigade Combat Team (Mountain) ("The Vermont Brigade") is an Army National Guard light infantry brigade headquartered in Vermont. It was reorganized from an armored brigade into an Infantry Brigade Combat Team (IBCT) as part of the United States Army's transformation for the 21st century. The 86th IBCT utilizes the Army Mountain Warfare School, co-located at Ethan Allen Firing Range in Jericho, Vermont, to train in individual military mountaineering skills so the entire brigade can be skilled in such warfare. This large conventional unit level mountain warfare capability had been lost when the 10th Mountain Division deactivated after World War II. This left the 86th IBCT as the only mountain warfare unit in the U.S. military whose soldiers were trained in mountain warfare, with individual soldiers being graduates of Ranger School, the Special Forces Advanced Mountain Operations School, and the Army Mountain Warfare School instead of entire units that specialized in such tactics. "The Vermont Brigade" configured itself to be such a unit.

== History ==
The lineage of the 86th Brigade goes back to 1878 in Montpelier with the Vermont Volunteer Militia and carries forth the campaign streamers of those units who would go on to be reorganized as the 86th Brigade.

The United States Army reorganized in the 1920s, following World War I. The army's system for numbering divisions during the war allocated 26 to 50 to the National Guard, and the post-war reorganization kept this convention, with the 26th Division, which served overseas during the war, allocated to the Massachusetts National Guard. The new 43rd Division was allocated to Maine, Vermont, Connecticut, and Rhode Island. The 86th Infantry Brigade, one of the division's subordinate units, was made up of the 172nd (Vermont), 103rd (Maine and New Hampshire) and 102nd (Connecticut) Infantry Regiments. The 102nd Infantry was subsequently allocated to the 85th Infantry Brigade.

=== 1920s to 1940s ===
From 1921 until the start of World War II the 86th Brigade continued as a subordinate command of the 43rd Division. The brigade headquarters was originally organized in Augusta, Maine, and received federal recognition in January 1923.

== Organization 1936 ==
- Headquarters and Headquarters Company (Augusta, Maine)
  - 103rd Infantry Regiment (Portland, Maine)
    - Service Company (minus Band), (Portland, Maine)
    - Medical Detachment (Portland, Maine)
    - Band (Lewiston, Maine)
    - Howitzer Company (Portland, Maine)
    - 1st Battalion (Buckfield, Maine)
  - Headquarters Company (Mechanic Falls, Maine)
    - Company A (Biddeford, Maine)
    - Company B (Rumford, Maine)
    - Company C (Norway, Maine)
    - Company D (Westbrook, Maine)
    - 2nd Battalion (Portland, Maine)
  - Headquarters Company (Pittsfield, Maine)
    - Company E (Lewiston, Maine)
    - Company F (Augusta, Maine)
    - Company G (Waterville, Maine)
    - Company H (Lewiston, Maine)
    - 3rd Battalion (Lewiston, Maine)
  - Headquarters Company (Augusta, Maine)
    - Company I (Millinocket, Maine)
    - Company K (Belfast, Maine)
    - Company L (Skowhegan, Maine)
    - Company M (Gardiner, Maine)
  - 172nd Infantry Regiment (Rutland, Vermont)
    - Service Company (minus Band) (Montpelier, Vermont)
    - Medical Detachment (Burlington, Vermont)
    - Band (Brattleboro, Vermont)
    - Howitzer Company (Bennington, Vermont)
  - 1st Battalion (Rutland, Vermont)
    - Headquarters Company (Rutland, Vermont)
    - Company A (Rutland, Vermont)
    - Company B (Ludlow, Vermont)
    - Company C (Lyndonville, Vermont)
    - Company D (St. Johnsbury, Vermont)
    - 2nd Battalion (Montpelier, Vermont)
    - Headquarters Company (Northfield, Vermont)
    - Company E (Bellows Falls, Vermont)
    - Company F (Northfield, Vermont)
    - Company G (Windsor, Vermont)
    - Company H (St. Albans, Vermont)
    - 3rd Battalion (Brattleboro, Vermont)
    - Headquarters Company (Orleans, Vermont)
    - Company I (Brattleboro, Vermont)
    - Company K (Burlington, Vermont)
    - Company L (Newport, Vermont)
    - Company M (Barre, Vermont)

=== World War II ===
The 43rd Infantry Division, including the 86th Brigade, continued as a square division until it was reorganized for World War II. On 24 February 1941, the 43rd Division, including the 86th Brigade, was activated for wartime service. The 86th Brigade underwent pre-deployment training at Camp Blanding, Florida, and Camp Shelby, Mississippi. On 19 February 1942 the 86th Brigade Headquarters was disbanded, as were other infantry brigade headquarters, with regiments under the triangular division concept now reporting directly to division commanders. The 43rd Division served in the Pacific throughout World War II, with the former 86th Brigade commander Leonard F. Wing becoming the assistant division commander under Major General John H. Hester and Major General John R. Hodge and the division commander from August 1943 to the division's inactivation in October 1945.

=== Post World War II ===
The 43rd Division continued in service after World War II, organized mainly in Connecticut, until being deactivated in 1967. The 172nd Infantry Regiment continued in service as a Vermont organization.

In 1963 the 86th Brigade Headquarters was reactivated, and in 1964 it was reorganized as a separate armored brigade. Army combat arms battalions kept regimental designations to maintain lineage and honors, but were no longer organized as regiments. 1st Battalion, 172nd Armor, a unit of the 86th Armored Brigade, was headquartered in St. Albans, and 2-172 Armor was headquartered in Rutland.

In 1968 the 86th Brigade was assigned to the 50th Armored Division, receiving M48A1 and soon after, M48A3 tanks. Between 1975 and 1976 Vermont and New Jersey armor battalions started turning in their old tanks and began receiving M48A5 tanks. During this time, many Vermont tank crews competed in gunnery exercises held in West Germany and consistently brought back awards. Training was rigorous during the Soviet threat peak years of the late 1970s to mid 1980s. Germany was the primary area of operations of the 50th Armored Division if it had been activated.

In 1984–5, Isby and Kamps listed the brigade as headquartered at Montpelier, Vermont, with the 1st and 2nd Battalions of the 172nd Armor and the 1st Battalion, 86th Field Artillery Regiment.

Reorganizing the Army National Guard to meet the new 'Division 86' structure in the mid-1980s was a challenging process. By October 1986 the brigade was reassigned to the 26th Infantry Division. Shortly thereafter, the 86th Brigade received M60A3 medium tanks.

As an armor unit the 86th Brigade excelled at gunnery, becoming the only National Guard armor unit to consistently accomplish Tank Table XII, which requires a platoon of four tanks to advance and fire simultaneously on a live fire range.

When the 26th Division inactivated in 1993, the 86th Brigade joined the 42nd Infantry Division and was soon to receive M1 Abrams main battle tanks. From 1988 to 1993, the brigade was commanded by Thomas D. Kinley, who went on to command the 42nd Division from 1996 to 1999. The brigade was deployed with various elements and attachments, to Iraq in 2004–2005 as Task Force Redleg, on a security mission to Kuwait in 2004 as Task Force Green Mountain, redeploying in 2005, and to Ramadi, Iraq, in 2005–2006 as Task Force Saber with the 2-28th Infantry Brigade Combat Team from the Pennsylvania Army National Guard.

In 2006, the brigade was re-designated as the 86th IBCT (Mountain) and began a transformation from a "heavy" brigade to a specialized light infantry formation, using 3rd Battalion 172nd Infantry Regiment (Mountain), previously a separate battalion, as the nucleus. The 86th brigade turned in its Abrams tanks and ended its armor designation, after almost 43 years of such history.

Turning armor formations into infantry and cavalry units while adding 1st Battalion 102nd Infantry from Connecticut, the brigade slowly formed from 2006 to 2008. The 86th IBCT welcomed the addition of the 1st Battalion, 101st Field Artillery Regiment from the Massachusetts Army National Guard on 14 September 2008.

The 86th IBCT mobilized in December 2009 at Camp Atterbury, Indiana, and completed a Joint Readiness Training Center rotation at Fort Polk prior to deployment in support of Operation Enduring Freedom. The brigade returned home in December 2010 after being replaced by 2nd IBCT, 34th Infantry Division. The 86th returned to Fort Polk JRTC program for another exercise mission in 2016.

== Operation Enduring Freedom ==
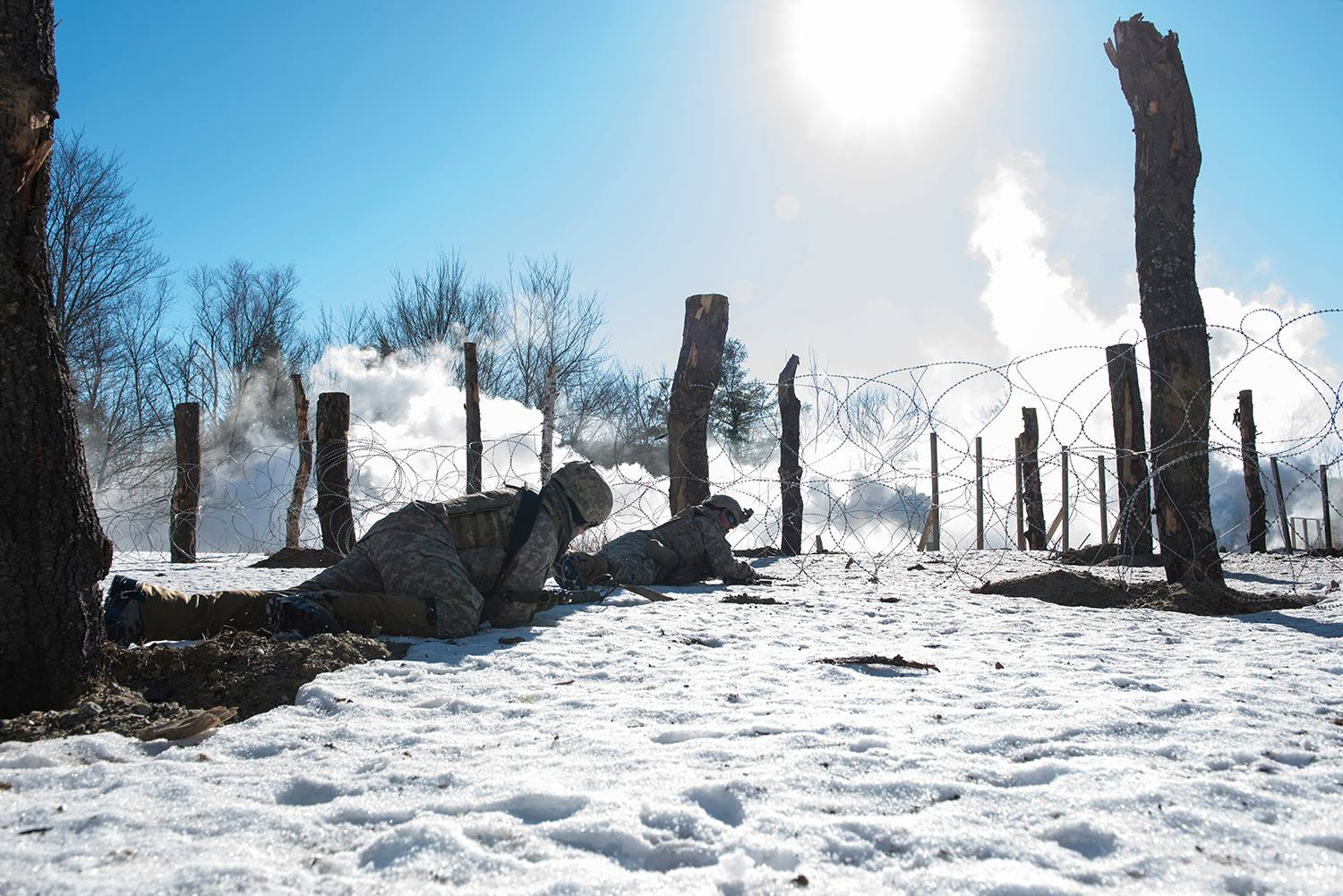
Combat engineers from the 86th IBCT practise obstacle clearing at Camp Ethan Allen Training Site.

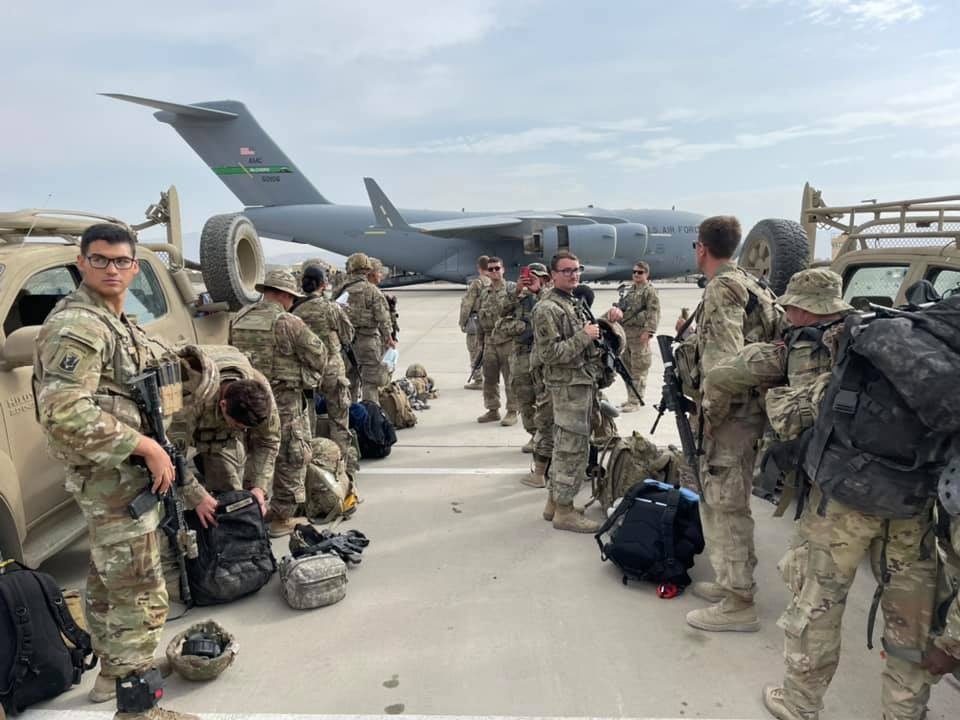
101st Field Artillery Regiment, 86th IBCT at Kabul International Airport during Operation Allies Refuge.

Around February 2008 soldiers of the 86th IBCT were beginning to receive notification of their upcoming deployment. The brigade commander at the time was Colonel William F. Roy. In 2009, the brigade did a rotation at JRTC in Fort Polk, Louisiana. In early December 2009, the brigade was officially mobilized and to report to Camp Atterbury, Indiana. While in Indiana, the brigade trained and prepped for their future deployment to Afghanistan.

After receiving numerous replacements and volunteer soldiers, the brigade was sent back to JRTC for one more rotation before they left the country. The majority of the brigade landed in Afghanistan in early March. The brigade headquarters was on Bagram Airfield in RC-East. The brigade was tasked with numerous missions being conducted all over eastern Afghanistan. The missions included partnering with the Afghan National Security Forces (ANSF), assisting the government of the Islamic Republic of Afghanistan, and securing over 30,000 soldiers on Bagram Airfield while ensuring the base was continuing its daily operations.

The brigade left Afghanistan in early December, returning to Camp Atterbury. The brigade was released from federal service and returned to the northeast to continue their respective state missions. A large amount of the brigade was awarded the Meritorious Unit Commendation for their service from 8 March 2010 to 4 December 2010 for their exceptional performance while deployed in support of Operation Enduring Freedom while 3rd Battalion, 172nd Infantry Regiment (Mountain) was awarded the Valorous Unit Award. In 2021, the 86th IBCT was sourced to support several missions around the world. The BDE HQ and 1-172D CAV deployed in support of KFOR29; 3-172D IN deployed in support of Operation Enduring Freedom - Operation Spartan Shield conducting missions in several countries throughout CENTCOM; 1-102D IN deployed to AFRICOM, supporting missions throughout the Horn of Africa; 1-101 FA deployed in support of Operation Enduring Freedom in the CENTCOM area of responsibility; and 1-157TH IN supplemented personnel for the sister unit missions.

== Organization 2025 ==
As of February 2026 the 86th Infantry Brigade Combat Team (Mountain) consists of the following units:

- 86th Infantry Brigade Combat Team (Mountain), at Ethan Allen Firing Range (VT)
  - Headquarters and Headquarters Company, 86th Infantry Brigade Combat Team (Mountain), at Ethan Allen Firing Range (VT)
  - 1st Squadron, 172nd Cavalry Regiment (Mountain), in St. Albans (VT)
    - Headquarters and Headquarters Troop, 1st Squadron, 172nd Cavalry Regiment (Mountain), in St. Albans (VT)
    - Troop A, 1st Squadron, 172nd Cavalry Regiment (Mountain), in Newport (VT)
    - Troop B, 1st Squadron, 172nd Cavalry Regiment (Mountain), in Bennington (VT)
    - Troop C (Dismounted), 1st Squadron, 172nd Cavalry Regiment (Mountain), in Lyndonville (VT)
  - 1st Battalion, 102nd Infantry Regiment (Mountain), in New Haven (CT)
    - Headquarters and Headquarters Company, 1st Battalion, 102nd Infantry Regiment (Mountain), in New Haven (CT)
    - Company A, 1st Battalion, 102nd Infantry Regiment (Mountain), in Norwalk (CT)
    - Company B, 1st Battalion, 102nd Infantry Regiment (Mountain), in Middletown (CT)
    - Company C, 1st Battalion, 102nd Infantry Regiment (Mountain), in New Britain (CT)
    - Company D (Weapons), 1st Battalion, 102nd Infantry Regiment (Mountain), in Middletown (CT)
  - 1st Battalion, 157th Infantry Regiment (Mountain), in Colorado Springs (CO)
    - Headquarters and Headquarters Company, 1st Battalion, 157th Infantry Regiment (Mountain), in Colorado Springs (CO)
    - Company A, 1st Battalion, 157th Infantry Regiment (Mountain), in Colorado Springs (CO)
    - Company B, 1st Battalion, 157th Infantry Regiment (Mountain), in Fort Lupton (CO)
    - Company C, 1st Battalion, 157th Infantry Regiment (Mountain), in Grand Junction (CO)
    - Company D (Weapons), 1st Battalion, 157th Infantry Regiment (Mountain), in Alamosa (CO)
      - Detachment 1, Company D (Weapons), 1st Battalion, 157th Infantry Regiment (Mountain), in Colorado Springs (CO)
  - 3rd Battalion, 172nd Infantry Regiment (Mountain), at Ethan Allen Firing Range (VT)
    - Headquarters and Headquarters Company, 3rd Battalion, 172nd Infantry Regiment (Mountain), at Ethan Allen Firing Range (VT)
    - Company A, 3rd Battalion, 172nd Infantry Regiment (Mountain), at Ethan Allen Firing Range (VT)
    - Company B, 3rd Battalion, 172nd Infantry Regiment (Mountain), in Brewer (ME)
    - Company C, 3rd Battalion, 172nd Infantry Regiment (Mountain), in Milford (NH)
    - Company D (Weapons), 3rd Battalion, 172nd Infantry Regiment (Mountain), in Westminster (VT)
  - 1st Battalion, 101st Field Artillery Regiment, in Brockton (MA)
    - Headquarters and Headquarters Battery, 1st Battalion, 101st Field Artillery Regiment, in Brockton (MA)
    - Battery A, 1st Battalion, 101st Field Artillery Regiment, in Fall River (MA)
    - Battery B, 1st Battalion, 101st Field Artillery Regiment, in Pittsfield (MA)
    - Battery C, 1st Battalion, 101st Field Artillery Regiment, in Danvers (MA)
  - 572nd Brigade Engineer Battalion, in Rutland (VT)
    - Headquarters and Headquarters Company, 572nd Brigade Engineer Battalion, in Rutland (VT)
    - Company A (Combat Engineer), 572nd Brigade Engineer Battalion, in Bradford (VT)
    - Company B (Combat Engineer), 572nd Brigade Engineer Battalion, in Vergennes (VT)
    - Company C (Signal), 572nd Brigade Engineer Battalion, in New London (CT)
    - Company D (Military Intelligence), 572nd Brigade Engineer Battalion, in Denver (CO)
      - Detachment 1, Company D (Military Intelligence), 572nd Brigade Engineer Battalion, at Buckley Space Force Base (CO) (RQ-28A UAV)
  - 186th Brigade Support Battalion, in Northfield (VT)
    - Headquarters and Headquarters Company, 186th Brigade Support Battalion, in Northfield (VT)
    - Company A (Distribution), 186th Brigade Support Battalion, in Berlin (VT)
    - Company B (Maintenance), 186th Brigade Support Battalion, in Colchester (VT)
    - Company C (Medical), 186th Brigade Support Battalion, in Winooski (VT)
    - Company D (Forward Support), 186th Brigade Support Battalion, in Swanton (VT) — attached to 1st Squadron, 172nd Cavalry Regiment (Mountain)
    - Company E (Forward Support), 186th Brigade Support Battalion, in Hartford (VT) — attached to 572nd Brigade Engineer Battalion
      - Detachment 3, Company E (Forward Support), 186th Brigade Support Battalion, in Denver (CO)
    - Company F (Forward Support), 186th Brigade Support Battalion, in Quincy (MA) — attached to 1st Battalion, 101st Field Artillery Regiment
    - Company G (Forward Support), 186th Brigade Support Battalion, in Morrisville (VT) — attached to 3rd Battalion, 172nd Infantry Regiment (Mountain)
    - Company H (Forward Support), 186th Brigade Support Battalion, in Southington (CT) — attached to 1st Battalion, 102nd Infantry Regiment (Mountain)
    - Company I (Forward Support), 186th Brigade Support Battalion, in Windsor (CO) — attached to 1st Battalion, 157th Infantry Regiment (Mountain)

== See also ==
- National Guard of the United States
- Brigade insignia of the United States Army
- Tabs of the United States Army
- Ram's Head Device
