= 172nd Infantry Regiment (United States, 1982–present) =

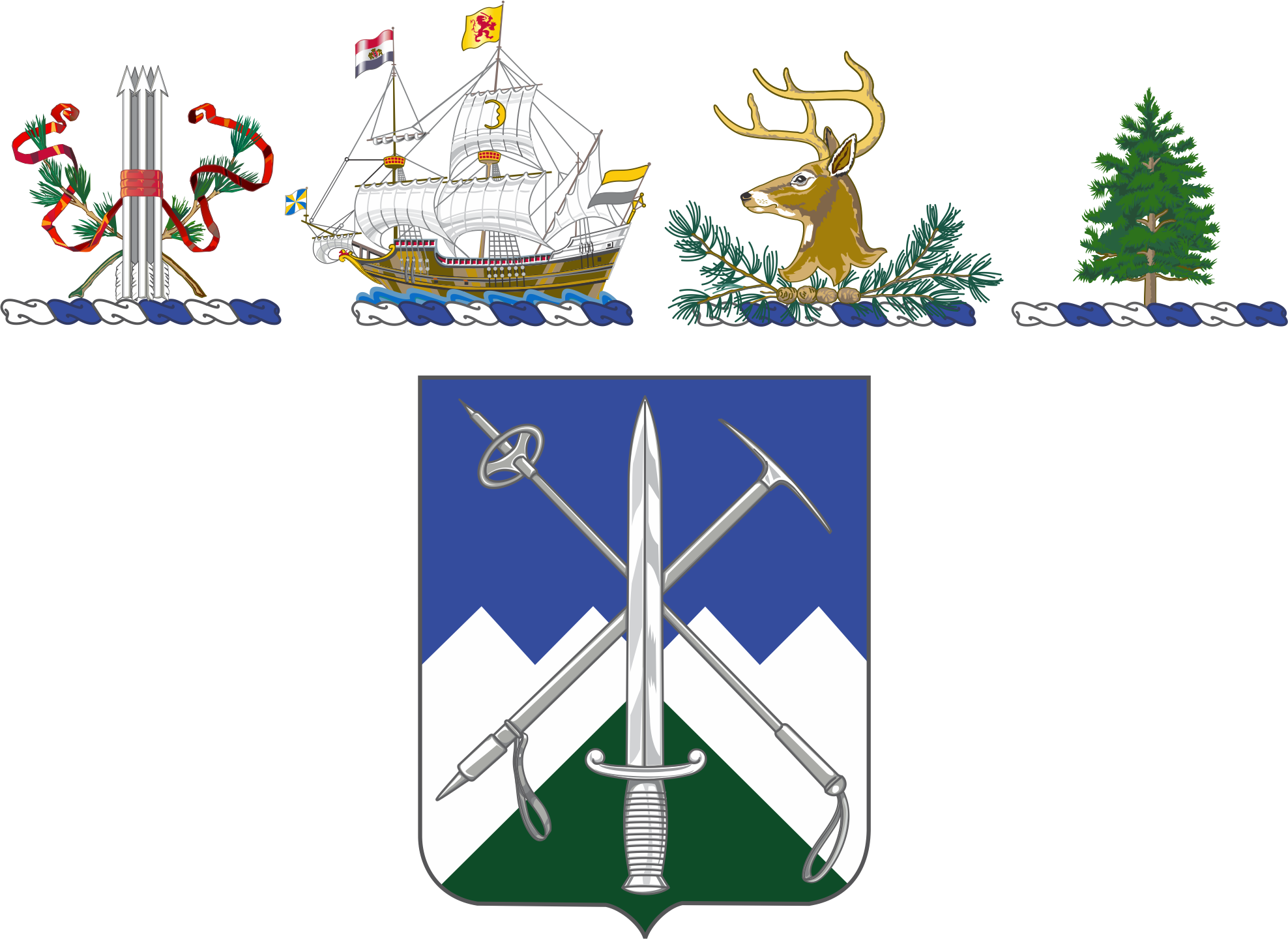
- Coat of arms
- Active: 1982-present
- Country: United States
- Branch: United States Army
- Type: Infantry
- Role: Mountain Warfare
- Part of: 86th Infantry Brigade Combat Team (United States)
- Motto: ASCEND TO VICTORY
- Colors: Blue

Insignia
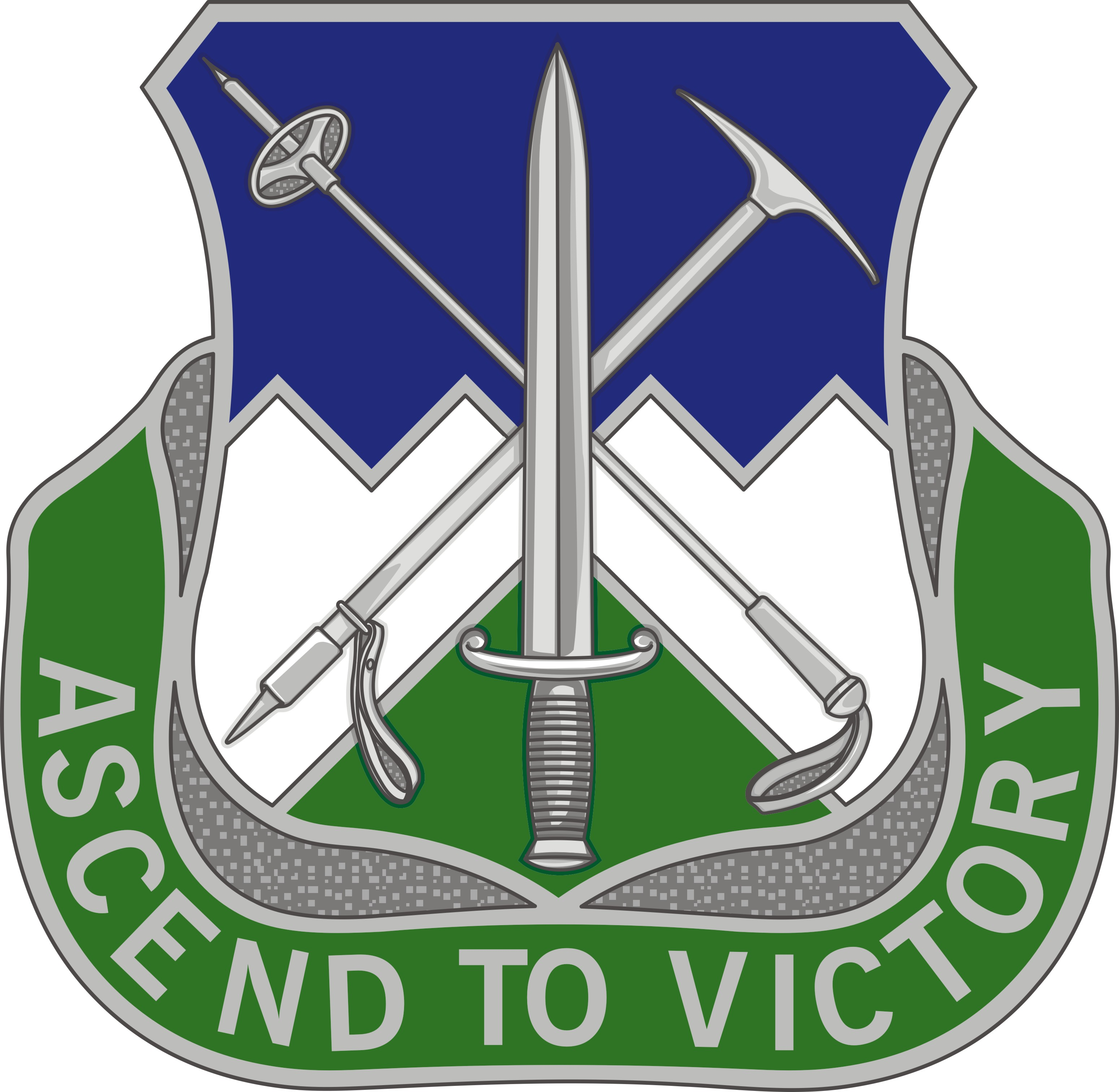
- Distinctive unit insignia

The 172nd Infantry Regiment is a Vermont Army National Guard infantry regiment which specializes in mountainous and cold weather operations. It falls under the command of the Vermont Army National Guard's 86th Infantry Brigade Combat Team (Mountain). Before the creation of the Infantry Brigade Combat Team in 2008, the regiment was recognized as the only conventional unit in the United States Army trained and equipped for mountain operations. The regiment draws heritage from the original 10th Mountain Division, which fought during World War II, both in the type of training they conduct and in the specialized equipment the unit maintains.

The regiment shares a name and numerical designation with the former 172nd Infantry Regiment, which is now an armored cavalry unit, but the two units are not lineally related.

== Mountain battalion history ==
The 172d Infantry (Regiment) (Mountain) was constituted on 1 September 1982 in the Vermont Army National Guard as the 72d Infantry, a parent regiment under the Combat Arms Regimental System, and organized to consist of Company A. Located in Vermont, Company A's mission was to conduct limited offensive and defensive operations and to provide support expertise to combat units engaged in mountain and winter operations. It was also tasked to provide special reconnaissance for combat units operating in these environments.

The regiment was redesignated 1 April 1983 as the 172d Infantry, and was reorganized on 1 December 1983 to consist of Company A and the 3d Battalion. Reorganized 1 October 1984 in the Maine, New Hampshire, New York, and Vermont Army National Guard as the 3d Battalion, 172nd Infantry Regiment (Mountain). Withdrawn 1 May 1989 from the Combat Arms Regimental System and reorganized under the United States Army Regimental System with headquarters at Jericho, Vermont. Reorganized 1 September 1992 in the Maine, New Hampshire, Rhode Island, and Vermont National Guard.

The Mountain Battalion Headquarters, HHC, and Company A are located in the Green Mountains of Vermont. The battalion headquarters is co-located with the Army's Mountain Warfare School. Company B and Company C are located in Maine and New Hampshire, respectively, while Company D and Company E (Forward Support Company) are located in Vermont.

In 2000, the Mountain Battalion developed a training relationship with the 1st Battalion (Airborne), 508th Infantry of the US Army's Southern European Task Force in Vincenza, Italy. During this time, the 'Mountain Men" of the 172d deployed numerous times to Europe and trained side-by-side with the paratroopers of SETAF and the US Army's Combined Maneuver Training Center in Hohenfels, Germany.

Operations in response to the 9/11 attacks saw the battalion's first combat deployments. The initial missions were company-size elements sent to Afghanistan (Battalion HQ), Kuwait (HHC), and Iraq (A, B, C Companies) during the early years of the War on Terrorism.

After returning from these separate missions, the battalion was assigned in October 2006 to be the nucleus of the newly formed 86th Infantry Brigade Combat Team (Mountain). Several years of training at the battalion and brigade level followed, taking the battalion to Montana, Virginia and other far-flung locations in preparation for an upcoming 86th IBCT (Mountain) deployment to Afghanistan as part of the Army's Force Generation System (ARFORGEN). This culminated in the entire brigade's mobilization and two trips to the Joint Readiness Training Center (JRTC) at Fort Polk, LA in late 2009 and early 2010.

Titled Task Force Avalanche, the battalion was then deployed to Paktia Province in Eastern Afghanistan in 2010. Detached to serve under the 3rd Brigade, 101st ABN (Air Assault), Mountain Soldiers conducted 10 months of counterinsurgency operations against the Taliban. The battalion returned from Afghanistan in late 2010 having earned the Valorous Unit Award.

In 2021, the Mountain Battalion was called upon to deploy a second time as part of the 86th IBCT (Mountain). Once again mobilized as Task Force Avalanche, the battalion would support numerous missions in several countries throughout CENTCOM's area of responsibility under Operation Enduring Freedom - Operation Spartan Shield. The battalion's Soldiers were awarded the Humanitarian Service Medal for its involvement in Kabul, Afghanistan Refugee Airlift of over 122,000 people as the United States brought it's war in Afghanistan to a close. Task Force Avalanche was awarded the Meritorious Unit Award for its efforts during the deployment.

The battalion is the only organization in the US Army specifically organized, trained, equipped, and tasked to close with and destroy the enemy in a total mountain environment. Approximately 50% of the soldiers in the battalion are coded with the Special Qualification Identifier (SQI) "E" Military Mountaineer, which is awarded to soldiers who graduate the Military Mountaineer Basic Course at the Army Mountain Warfare School, located in Jericho, Vermont. No other unit has the capability to conduct combat operations in such extreme environments.

The Mountain Infantrymen of this battalion follow a long heritage of citizen soldiers and warriors, who have served the country for almost 400 years.

In June 2026, Charlie Company, 3rd Battalion, 172nd Infantry Regiment deployed to Ft. Bliss to train before going to the Middle East to support Operation Spartan Shield.

== 3-172 IN (MTN) Shoulder Sleeve Insignia history ==
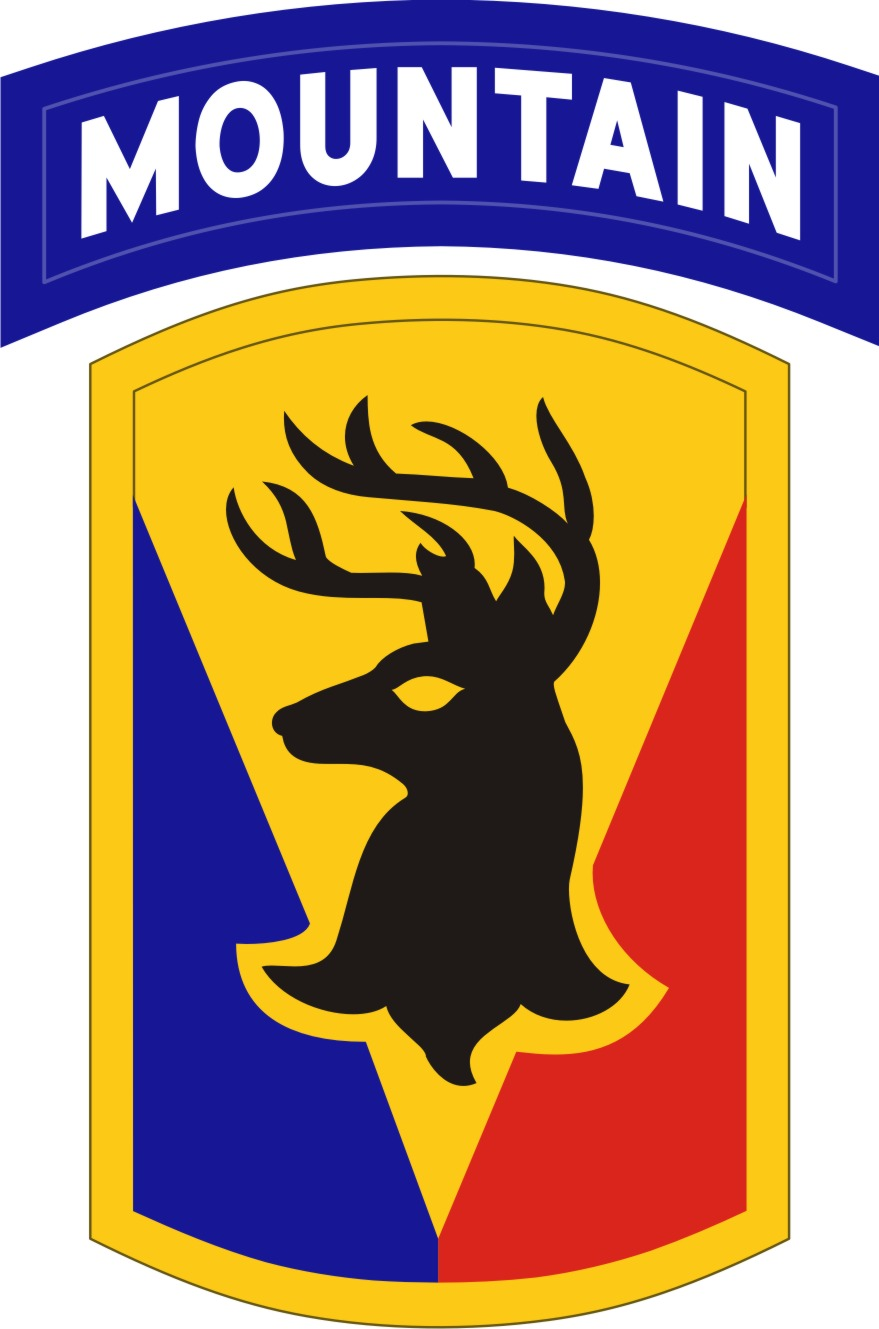

From the unit's inception in 1982, until the formation of the 86th IBCT in 2007, the battalion wore the First Army insignia with "Mountain" Tab as its SSI. This was originally only temporarily authorized, but as time passed no further provision of SSI for the organization was made. This is a debated and controversial unit insignia as it is almost completely unknown amongst the senior leadership of the United States Army. Many soldiers incorrectly believe that the 10th Mountain Division and the 86th IBCT are the only units ever authorized to wear a Mountain Tab.

There are numerous veterans of OIF and OEF who are authorized to wear the First Army insignia with "Mountain" Tab as a "combat patch" (SSI-FWTSI). The only known proof of authorization for wear of the First Army insignia with Mountain Tab for members of 3-172 IN (MTN) hangs framed in the unit's home Armory in Jericho, VT.

Note: Department of the Army policy states that tabs such Mountain and Airborne are integral parts of the shoulder sleeve insignia, and all soldiers within a unit wear the same SSI. Subordinate units within a command are not authorized to add Mountain or Airborne Tabs if their units happen to be Mountain or Airborne within larger non-Airborne or non-Mountain commands. This practice, however unauthorized, has gone on for decades, particularly with small Airborne units within non-Airborne commands. Additionally, although US Army units, such as the 4th Infantry Division, being stationed at Fort Carson, CO the "Mountain Post" has requested to be authorized to add the Mountain Tab over their SSIs, the Department of the Army has denied all such requests. The Mountain Tab is part of a shoulder sleeve insignia, not an individual or unit qualification award or recognition for combat service in mountains.

== The Mountain Creed ==
Motivation, drive, determination and honor are the hallmark of the Mountain Soldier. My uniform's appearance and respect for those appointed over me shall set the standard for others to follow.

Ours is not an impossible mission. To meet the enemy on the field of battle requires that I be proficient in my job, Mountain skills, and the tactics required to operate in an alpine environment.

Ultimately mine is a mission of peace. However, if called upon, I will, without hesitation, respond to my country's call. Through personal sacrifice, I will gallantly defend my country and its allies.

Never shall I quit until my objective is achieved. Failure to complete my mission, whether in peace or war will invariably cause the unit as a whole to fail.

Training is essential to my survival and to that of my brother Mountain Soldiers. Without the knowledge training provides I will surely fail. Whether training with allies or at the lowest level I will continuously challenge myself to attain the highest standards.

Always will I keep my equipment and myself ready for whatever task I may be given. The sheer nature of my unit's mission requires that I maintain my equipment and master its capabilities and employment. My brother Soldiers and Countrymen count on my ability to shoot better, climb higher, ski farther, and fight with more cunning and aggression than any enemy I may face.

Initiative is the force that will allow me to prevail on the field of battle. I will do more than is required of myself to further my unit's mission and ensure its total victory in combat.

Never will I leave a fallen Soldier on the field of battle. I will courageously continue to fight until the enemy is vanquished and the last round expended and all the members of my unit are accounted for. I will conduct myself with honor, pride, and an esprit de corps second to none, whether in peace or wartime whether at home or abroad, for my mission is to...ASCEND TO VICTORY!

== Distinctive unit insignia ==
- Description

A Silver color metal and enamel device 1 1/8 inches (2.9 cm) in height consisting of a shield blazoned as follows: Per fess dancetty of four Azure and Argent issuant in base a mount Vert and overall in bend a ski pole crossed by an ice axe in bend sinister, in pale overall a sword point up of the second. Attached below and to the sides a green motto scroll bearing the words "ASCEND TO VICTORY" in Silver letters.

- Symbolism

Blue and white are the colors associated with Infantry. The indented partition line denotes the four states represented in the regiment, and with the ice axe and ski pole, also refers to the (Mountain) designation of the regiment. The upright sword denotes the unit's basic Infantry mission and the green mountain in base alludes to the headquarters, State of Vermont, which means "green mountain."

- Background

The distinctive unit insignia was approved on 16 March 1987.

== Coat of arms ==
=== Blazon ===
- Shield

Per fess dancetty of four Azure and Argent issuant in base a mount Vert and overall in bend a ski pole crossed by an ice axe in bend sinister, in pale overall a sword point up of the second.

- Crest

That for the regiments and separate battalions of the New Hampshire Army National Guard: On a wreath of the colors Argent and Azure two pine branches saltirewise Proper crossed behind a bundle of five arrows palewise Argent bound together by a ribbon Gules the ends entwining the branches. That for the regiments and separate battalions of the New York Army National Guard: On a wreath of the colors Argent and Azure the full-rigged ship "Half Moon" all Proper. That for the regiments and separate battalions of the Vermont Army National Guard: On a wreath of the colors Argent and Azure a buck's head erased within a garland of pine branches, all Proper. That for the regiments and separate battalions of the Maine Army National Guard: On a wreath of the colors Argent and Azure a pine tree Proper.

Motto ASCEND TO VICTORY.

  - Symbolism
- Shield

Blue and white are the colors associated with Infantry. The indented partition line denotes the four states represented in the regiment, and with the ice axe and ski pole, also refers to the (Mountain) designation of the regiment. The upright sword denotes the unit's basic Infantry mission and the green mountain in base alludes to the headquarters, State of Vermont, which means "green mountain."

- Crest

The crests are those of the New Hampshire, Rhode Island, Vermont and Maine Army National Guard.

- Background

The coat of arms was approved on 16 March 1987.
