= 43rd Infantry Division (United States) =

- 43rd Infantry Division shoulder sleeve insignia
- Active: 1925–1945; 1946–1963
- Country: United States
- Branch: United States Army
- Type: Infantry
- Size: Division
- Nickname: "Winged Victory Division"
- Engagements: World War II; New Guinea; Northern Solomons; Philippines campaign
- Decorations: Presidential Unit Citation (4 Battalions)

Commanders
- Notable commanders: John R. Hodge; Leonard F. Wing; Kenneth F. Cramer

Insignia
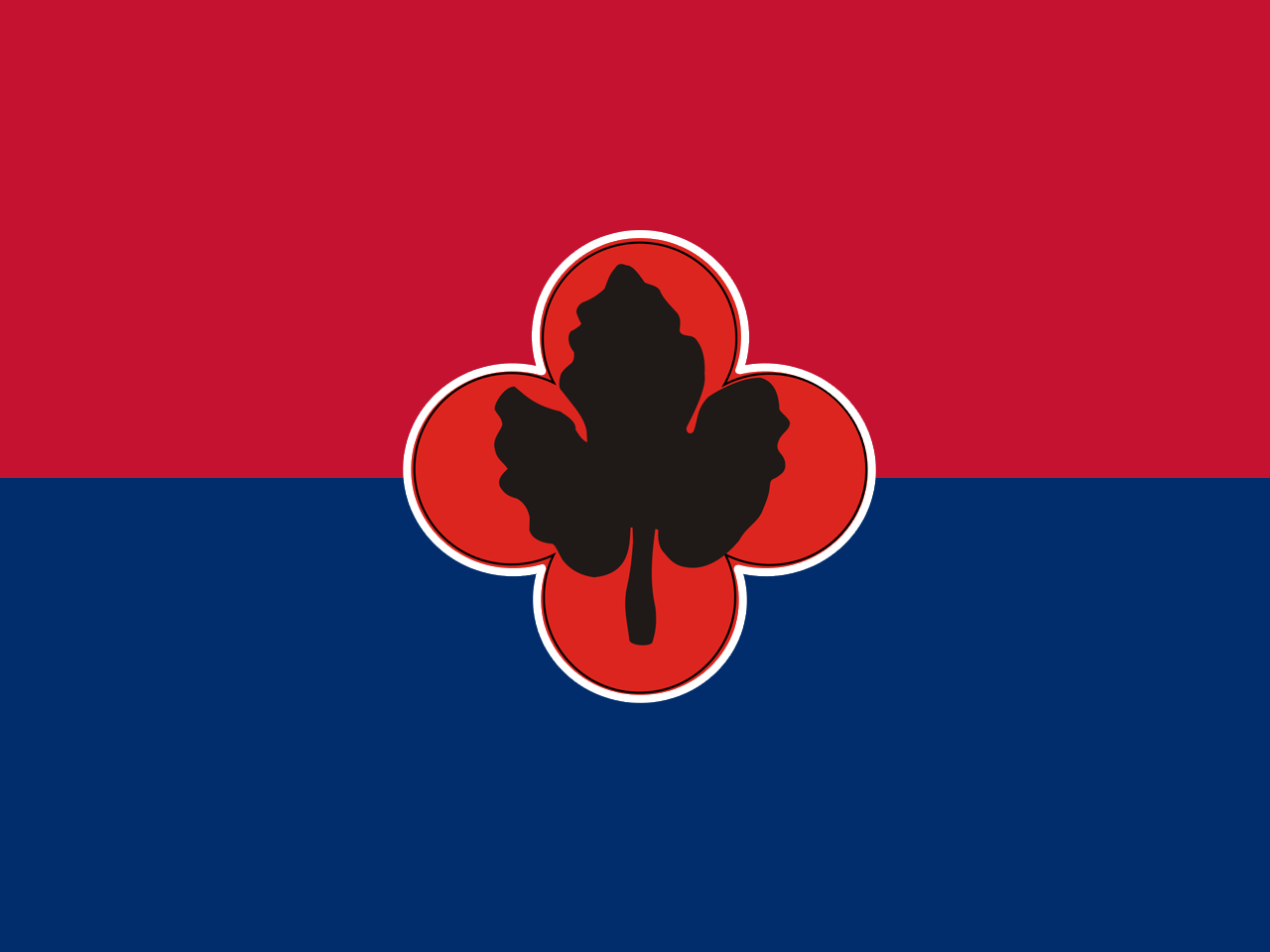
- Flag of the United States Army 43rd Infantry Division

The 43rd Infantry Division was a formation of the United States Army from 1920 to 1963, serving in the Pacific during World War II. It was activated in 1920 as a National Guard Division in Connecticut, Maine, Rhode Island, and Vermont. The 143rd Regional Support Group of the Connecticut National Guard now carries on the heritage.

== History ==
=== Formation and interwar period ===
The 1920 amendments to the National Defense Act of 1916 provided for eighteen National Guard divisions. Seventeen National Guard divisions had served in the First World War; the 42nd "Rainbow" Division was not reconstituted after the war, and the 39th "Delta" Division was eliminated from the force structure in 1923 by being renamed the 31st Division. The 43rd, 44th, and 45th Divisions were constituted as new units. The 43rd Division was allotted as the National Guard division for the New England states of Connecticut, Maine, Rhode Island, and Vermont; units from these states had previously belonged to the 26th Division, which became a Massachusetts-only outfit.

The 43rd Infantry Division was constituted in the National Guard on 19 October 1920, allotted to the First Corps Area, and assigned to the I Corps, with the division headquarters being organized and federally recognized in Hartford, Connecticut, on 21 March 1925. The 43rd Division consisted of two infantry brigades, the 85th in Connecticut, and the 86th in Vermont. The 85th Infantry Brigade included the 102nd and 169th Infantry Regiment, both based in Connecticut. The 86th Infantry Brigade was made up of the 172nd Infantry Regiment in Vermont and the 103rd Infantry in Maine. In addition, the 68th Field Artillery Brigade was based in Providence, Rhode Island.

The division staff, composed of personnel from all four states, came together each summer to conduct joint training, usually held at the Connecticut State Camp military area near Niantic. The staff participated in the First Army command post exercises at Camp Dix, New Jersey, in 1931 and 1934, and at Fort Devens, Massachusetts, in 1936 and 1937. From 1922 to 1939, the division's subordinate units generally held separate summer camps at locations within their respective states: Connecticut units at Niantic; Rhode Island units at Quonset Point; Maine units at Camp Keyes, near Augusta; and Vermont units at Fort Ethan Allen. The division was assembled in one place for the first time at Fort Devens in June 1930. During that camp, training was conducted at the squad and platoon level due to the relative inexperience of the units’ soldiers. The next opportunity for the 43rd Division to function as a complete unit came in August 1935 when it participated in the First and Second Corps Area phase of the First Army maneuvers at Pine Camp, New York. In 1939, the “Winged Victory” Division again participated in the First Army maneuvers, this time at Plattsburg, New York, as part of the provisional I Corps. The 43rd Division's last major training event before induction was the First Army maneuvers near Canton, New York, in August 1940. The division was relieved from the I Corps on 30 December 1940 and assigned to the IV Corps. It was inducted into federal service at home stations on 24 February 1941 and ordered to move to Camp Blanding, Florida, where it arrived on 13 March 1941. After the division's initial train-up period, it participated in the IV Corps Louisiana Maneuvers in August 1941, in the GHQ maneuvers near Bellwood, Louisiana, in September 1941, and in the First Army Carolina Maneuvers near Peachland-Camden, in October–November 1941.

==== Organization 1924 ====
Units in italics indicate the state of headquarters allocation but at the given date, the headquarters was not yet organized.

- 43rd Division (Connecticut National Guard)
  - 85th Infantry Brigade, in New London (CT)
    - 169th Infantry Regiment, in Hartford (CT)
    - 170th Infantry Regiment, in New Haven (CT) (redesignated 102nd Infantry Regiment on 28 February 1924)
  - 86th Infantry Brigade, in Augusta (ME)
    - 103rd Infantry Regiment, in Portland (ME)
    - 172nd Infantry Regiment, in Brattleboro (VT)
  - 68th Field Artillery Brigade, in Providence (RI)
    - 103rd Field Artillery Regiment, in Providence (RI)
    - 152nd Field Artillery Regiment (Maine National Guard)
    - 118th Ammunition Train (Vermont National Guard)
  - 118th Engineer Regiment (Rhode Island National Guard)
  - 118th Medical Regiment, in New Haven (CT)
  - Headquarters, Special Troops (Connecticut National Guard)
    - Division Headquarters Company, in Putnam (CT)
    - 43rd Signal Company, in Providence (RI)
    - 43rd Tank Company (Light), in Branford (CT)
    - 43rd Military Police Company (Connecticut National Guard)
    - Motorcycle Company No. 118, in Hartford (CT)
    - 118th Ordnance Company (Medium) (Rhode Island National Guard)
  - 43rd Division Train, Quartermaster Corps (Vermont National Guard)
  - 43rd Division Air Service, in Hartford (CT)

=== World War II ===
==== WWII division organization ====
===== Square division =====
On 24 February 1941, the 43rd Division was inducted into federal service at home stations and then moved to Camp Blanding in Florida. At the time the division still retained its World War I square organization and consisted of the following units.

43rd Division square organization (click to enlarge)

- 43rd Division, in New London (CT)
  - 43rd Division Headquarters
  - 85th Infantry Brigade, in New Haven (CT)
    - Headquarters and Headquarters Company
    - 102nd Infantry Regiment, in New Haven (CT)
      - Headquarters and Headquarters Company
      - 3× Infantry battalions
        - each battalion consists of: 1× Headquarters and Headquarters Detachment, 3× Rifle companies, 1× Weapons Company
      - Anti-Tank Company (M3 37mm Anti-Tank guns)
      - Service Company
    - 169th Infantry Regiment, in Hartford (CT)
      - same organization as 102nd Infantry Regiment
  - 86th Infantry Brigade, in Rutland City (VT)
    - Headquarters and Headquarters Company
    - 103rd Infantry Regiment, in Portland (ME)
      - same organization as 102nd Infantry Regiment
    - 172nd Infantry Regiment, in Bennington (VT)
      - same organization as 102nd Infantry Regiment
  - 68th Field Artillery Brigade, in Providence (RI)
    - Headquarters and Headquarters Battery
    - 103rd Field Artillery Regiment, in Providence (RI)
      - Headquarters and Headquarters Battery
      - 2× Light Field Artillery battalions
        - Headquarters and Headquarters Battery
        - 3× Howitzer batteries (M1897 75mm field guns), replaced by M2 105mm towed howitzers in 1941)
        - Service Battery
    - 152nd Field Artillery Regiment, in Bangor (ME)
      - same organization as 103rd Field Artillery Regiment
    - 192nd Field Artillery Regiment, in New London (CT)
      - Headquarters and Headquarters Battery
      - 2× Medium Field Artillery battalions
        - Headquarters and Headquarters Battery
        - 3× Howitzer batteries (M1918 155mm towed howitzers, replaced by M1 155mm towed howitzers in 1941)
        - Anti-Tank Battery (M1897 75mm anti-tank guns)
        - Service Battery
  - 118th Engineer Regiment, in Providence (RI)
    - Headquarters and Headquarters and Service Company
    - 2× Engineer battalions
      - each battalion consists of: 1× Headquarters, 3× Engineer companies
  - 118th Medical Regiment, in New Haven (CT)
    - Headquarters and Headquarters and Service Company
    - Collecting Battalion
      - battalion consists of: 1× Headquarters, 3× Collecting companies
    - Ambulance Battalion
      - battalion consists of: 1× Headquarters, 3× Ambulance companies
    - Clearing Battalion
      - battalion consists of: 1× Headquarters, 3× Clearing companies
  - 118th Quartermaster Regiment, in West Hartford (CT)
    - Headquarters and Headquarters Company
    - 2× Truck battalions
      - each battalion consists of: 1× Headquarters, 2× Truck companies
    - Light Maintenance and Car Battalion
      - battalion consists of: 1× Headquarters, 1× Light Maintenance Company, 1× Car Company
    - Service Company
  - Headquarters, Special Troops, in Danielson (CT)
    - Headquarters Company, 43rd Division, in Putnam (CT)
    - 43rd Signal Company, in Providence (RI)
    - 118th Ordnance Company, in Providence (RI)
    - 43rd Military Police Company, in Danielson (CT)

After the division's basic training, it participated in the Louisiana Maneuvers in August–September 1941 and the Carolina Maneuvers later that same year. The division then relocated to Camp Shelby in Mississippi, where it was located when the United States entered the war.

===== Triangular division =====
On 19 February 1942, as a part of an Army-wide reorganization of National Guard divisions, the 43rd Division was reorganized as a triangular division. The division's two brigade headquarters were disbanded in favor of a structure containing three separate regimental commands reporting directly to the division headquarters, as well as four field artillery battalions under a division artillery headquarters, with the engineer, medical, and quartermaster regiments also reduced to battalions. The 102nd Infantry Regiment had already sailed to Bora Bora in French Polynesia on 19 January 1942. On 19 February 1942, the regiment was officially relieved from assignment to 43rd Division and assigned to the General Headquarters Reserve. With the reorganization the division was renamed 43rd Infantry Division. Afterwards the 43rd Infantry Division was composed of the following units:

43rd Infantry Division triangular organization (click to enlarge)

- 43rd Infantry Division
  - 43rd Infantry Division Headquarters
  - 43rd Cavalry Reconnaissance Troop (Mechanized) (M3 scout cars and then M8 Greyhound armored cars)
  - 103rd Infantry Regiment (assigned to division on 1 September 1942)
    - Headquarters and Headquarters Company
    - 3× Infantry battalions
      - each battalion consists of: 1× Headquarters and Headquarters Company, 3× Rifle companies, 1× Heavy Weapons Company
    - Cannon Company (T12 Gun Motor Carriages and T19 Howitzer Motor Carriages, later replaced by either M3 105mm towed howitzers or M7 Priest self propelled howitzers)
    - Anti-Tank Company (M3 37mm anti-tank guns, which were replaced by 1944 with M1 57mm anti-tank guns)
    - Service Company
  - 169th Infantry Regiment
    - same organization as 103rd Infantry Regiment
  - 172nd Infantry Regiment
    - same organization as 103rd Infantry Regiment
  - 43rd Infantry Division Artillery
    - Headquarters and Headquarters Battery
    - 103rd Field Artillery Battalion
      - Headquarters and Headquarters Battery
      - 3× Batteries (M2 105mm towed howitzers)
      - Service Battery
    - 152nd Field Artillery Battalion
      - same organization as 103rd Field Artillery Battalion
    - 169th Field Artillery Battalion
      - same organization as 103rd Field Artillery Battalion
    - 192nd Field Artillery Battalion
      - Headquarters and Headquarters Battery
      - 3× Batteries (M1 155mm towed howitzers)
      - Service Battery
  - Headquarters Special Troops
    - Headquarters Company, 43rd Infantry Division
    - 43rd Signal Company
    - 43rd Quartermaster Company
    - 743rd Ordnance Light Maintenance Company
    - 118th Military Police Platoon
    - 43rd Infantry Division Band (attached)
  - 43rd Quartermaster Battalion (Between September and November 1942 Quartermaster battalions were disbanded and their platoons used to form a Quartermaster Company and an Ordnance Company, which were both assigned to Headquarters Special Troops)
    - Headquarters and Headquarters Company (includes a service platoon and a maintenance platoon)
    - Truck Company
  - 118th Engineer Combat Battalion
    - Headquarters and Headquarters and Service Company
    - 3× Engineer combat companies
  - 118th Medical Battalion
    - Headquarters and Headquarters Detachment
    - 3× Collecting companies
    - Clearing Company

==== Combat chronicle ====
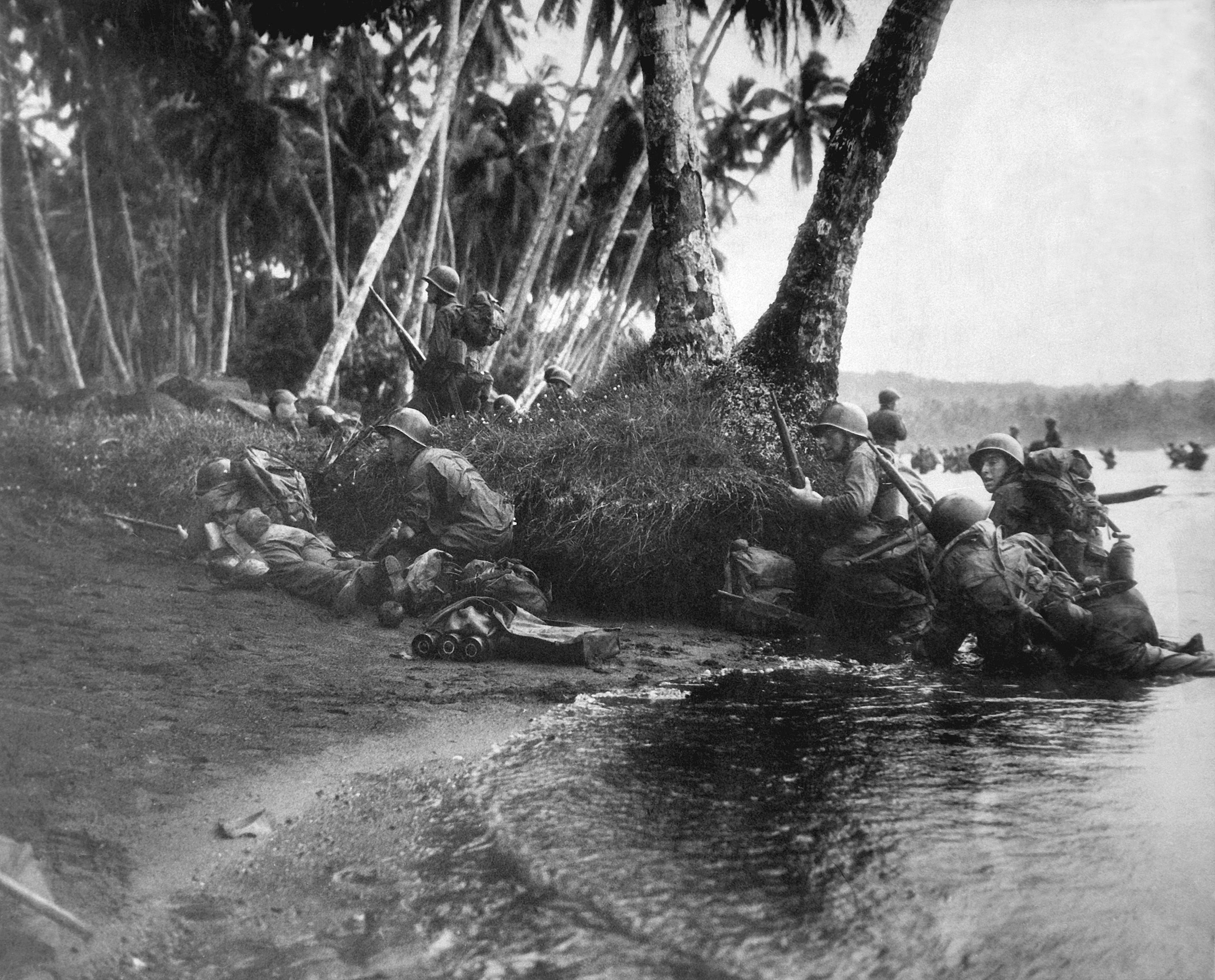
43rd ID soldiers landing on Rendova Island in the Solomon Islands, 30 June 1943.

The 43rd Infantry Division landed in New Zealand on 23 October 1942. The 172nd Infantry Regiment arrived at Espiritu Santo, 26 October.

The division staged for shipment overseas at Fort Ord, California, on 6 September 1942 and departed San Francisco on 1 October. The division arrived in New Zealand on 23 October 1942, prior to being committed to combat in the South West Pacific Theater under the command of General Douglas MacArthur. The division moved to Noumea, New Caledonia, in November and to Guadalcanal, 17 February 1943. The Russell Islands were occupied without opposition, 21 February, and training continued. Elements landed on Vangunu and Rendova Islands against minor resistance, 30 June.

Rendova served as the major staging point for the assault on the island of New Georgia. The assault on New Georgia was met with determined enemy resistance. The Japanese fought fiercely before relinquishing Munda and its airfield, 5 August. Vela Cela and Baanga were taken easily, but the Japanese resisted stubbornly on Arundel Island before withdrawing, 22 September.

After training at Munda, the 43rd moved to Guadalcanal and thence to New Zealand for rest and rehabilitation. On 19 July 1944, the division was deployed to the Aitape-Wewak campaign, assuming defensive positions at Aitape. It engaged in patrols and reconnaissance at Tadji and along the Drinumor River, 25 July, and took the offensive, 8 August 1944, ending organized resistance on the 25th. On 9 January 1945, the 43rd made an assault landing in the San Fabian area, Lingayen Gulf, Luzon. Under enemy fire, the Division secured the beachhead and fought into the Lingayen Plain by 12 February. The offensive was resumed against the enemy north and west of Fort Stotsenburg, 27 February. After ending Japanese resistance in the Zambales Mountains with help from the Philippine resistance, the 43rd swung south against the Shimbu Line. On 6 May 1945, the attack continued in the Bulacan area. Ipo Dam was secured and enemy opposition smashed in the Ipo area, 19 May. Mopping-up activities continued until 30 June 1945. The Division left Manila, 7 September 1945, and arrived in Yokohama, Japan on 13 September for occupation duty. The division began preparations for departure for home on 27 September 1945, and officially began their departure on 29 September. The first ship arrived in San Francisco on 8 October 1945, three years and seven days after the first ship had left on 1 October 1942. The division troops were then moved to Camp Stoneman near Pittsburg, California, and arrangements were made to send each man to the Army separation center nearest his home.

==== Casualties ====
- Total battle casualties: 6,026
- Killed in action: 1,128
- Wounded in action: 4,887
- Missing in action: 9
- Prisoner of war: 2

==== Statistics ====
- Overseas: 1 October 1942.
- Campaigns: New Guinea, Northern Solomons, Luzon.
- Presidential Unit Citations: 4 Infantry Battalions (Luzon).
- Personal Awards: MH-2; DSC-40; DSM-2; SS-736; LM-53; SM-51; BSM-2,496; AM-27.
- Commanders: Maj. Gen. Morris B. Payne (February–August 1941), Maj. Gen. John H. Hester (8 October 1941-July 1943), Maj. Gen. John R. Hodge (July 1943 to August 1943), Maj. Gen. Leonard F. Wing (August 1943 to inactivation).
- Returned to U.S.: 19 October 1945.
- Inactivated: 26 October 1945.

==== Commanders ====
- Morris B. Payne, July 1927 to August 1941
- John H. Hester, August 1941 to July 1943
- John R. Hodge, July 1943 to August 1943
- Leonard F. Wing, August 1943 to November 1945

=== Cold War ===
143rd Regional Support Group
- Active: 1997 - Present
- Country: United States
- Branch: United States Army National Guard
- Role: Support
- Size: Group
- Part of: Connecticut Army National Guard
- Garrison/HQ: MG Maurice Rose Armed Forces Reserve Center, Middletown, CT
- Website: https://ct.ng.mil/Units/Major-Separate-Commands/143rd-Regional-Support-Group/

Commanders
- Current commander: Col. Benjamin Neumon
- Command Sergeant Major: CSM David Moorehead

Insignia
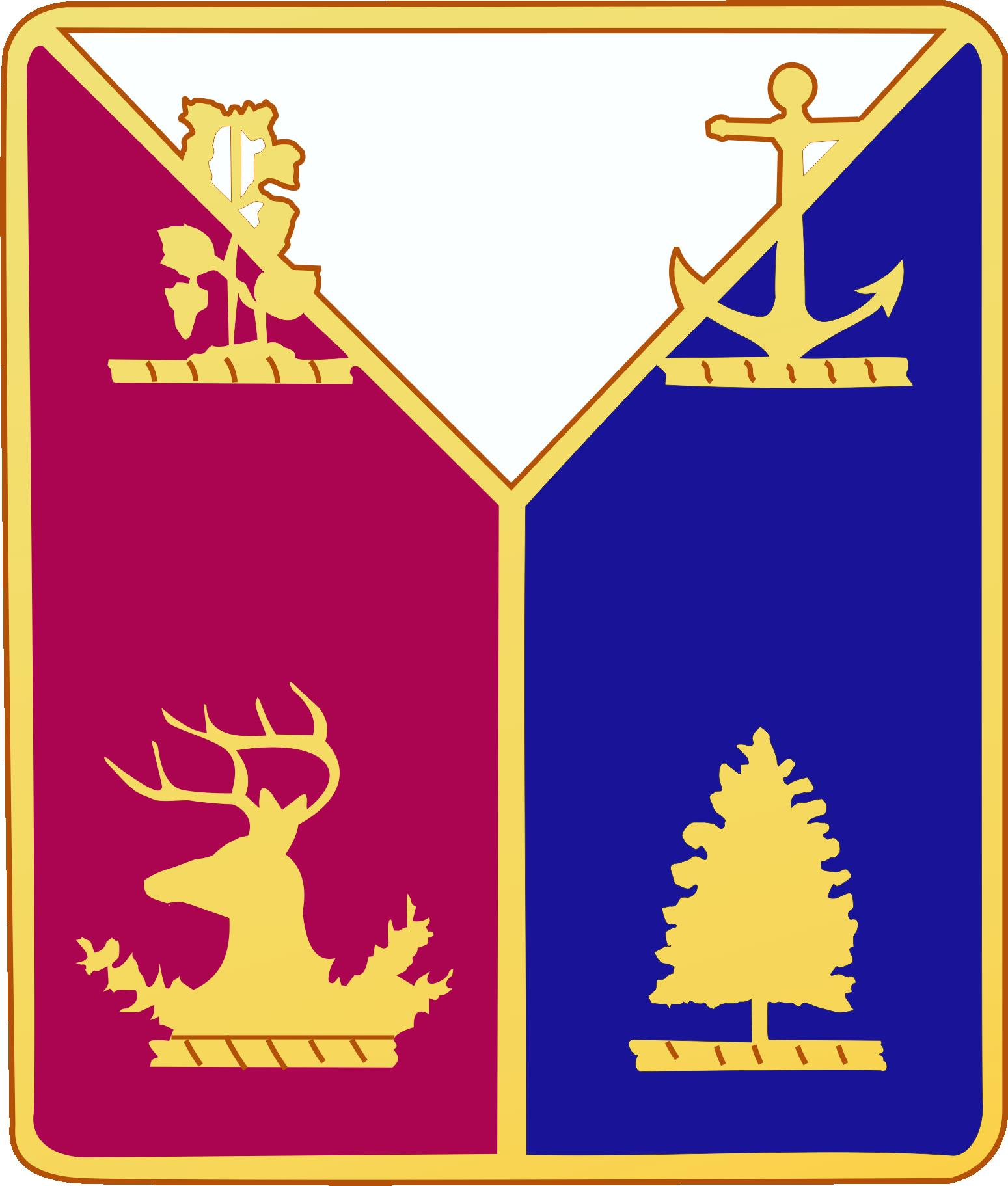
- 143rd Regional Support Group DUI

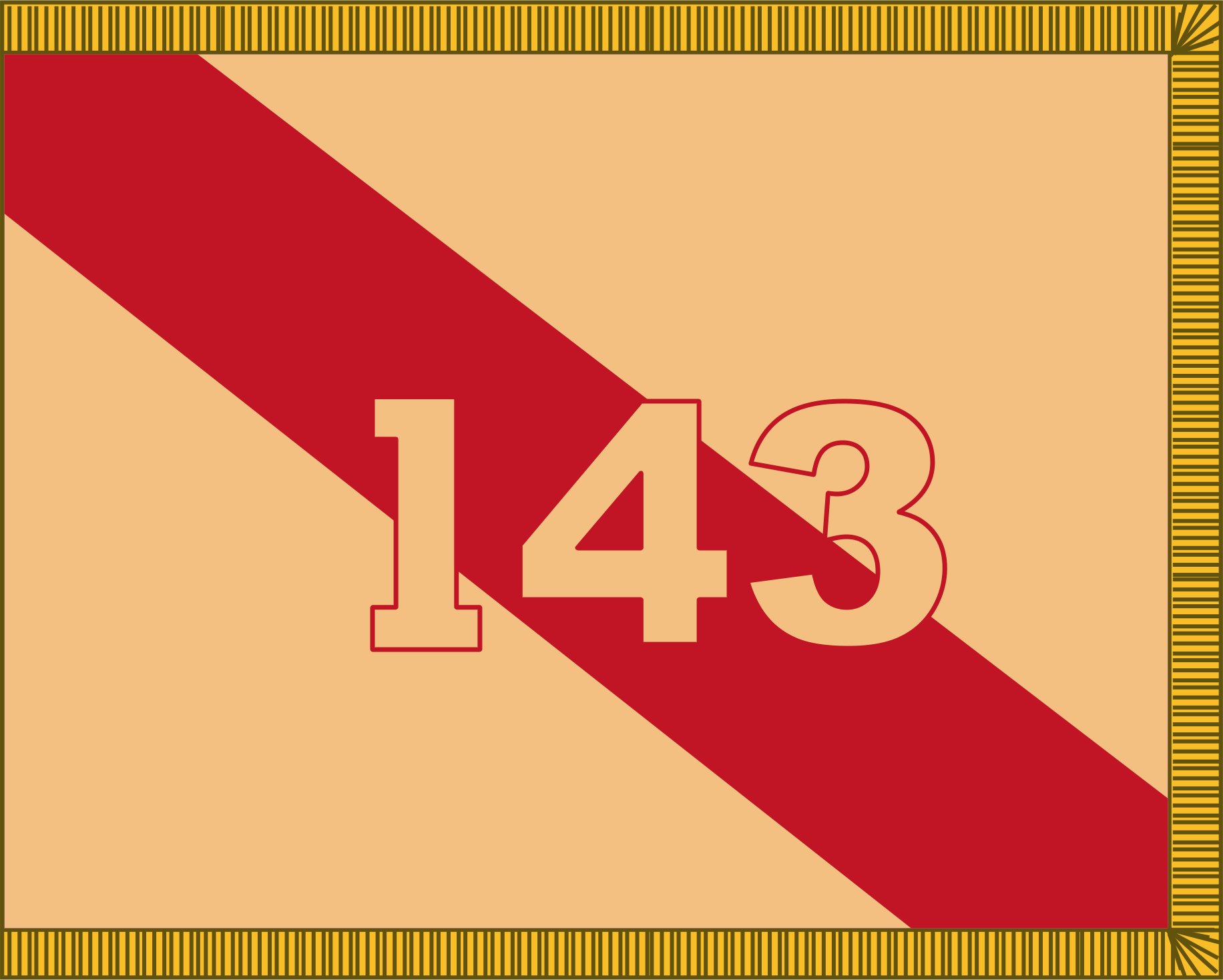
- 143rd Regional Support Group Flag

In 1946 the Division was reorganized again, and was now made up of units from Connecticut, Vermont and Rhode Island. The 172d Infantry with the 206th Field Artillery Battalion were based in Vermont. The division headquarters, 102d and 169th Infantry Regiments, and 963d Field Artillery and 192d Field Artillery were organized in Connecticut. In addition, Connecticut was also home to the 143d Tank Battalion. Rhode Island was home to Headquarters, 43d Division Artillery; the 103d Field Artillery Battalion; the 118th Engineer Battalion; and the 43d Signal Company. Combat Support units were based throughout all three states.

During the Korean War, the 43d Division was again ordered into active Federal Service on 5 September 1950 and was moved to Seventh United States Army, VII Corps in West Germany in 1951. On 15 June 1954, the 43d Infantry Division was released and returned to state control. Its elements, stationed in the Augsburg/Munich area, were reflagged as the units of the 5th Infantry Division. Division elements in the Nuernberg Area such as the 169th Infantry Regiment became units of the 9th Infantry Division. The 169th Infantry reflagged as the 39th Infantry Regiment.

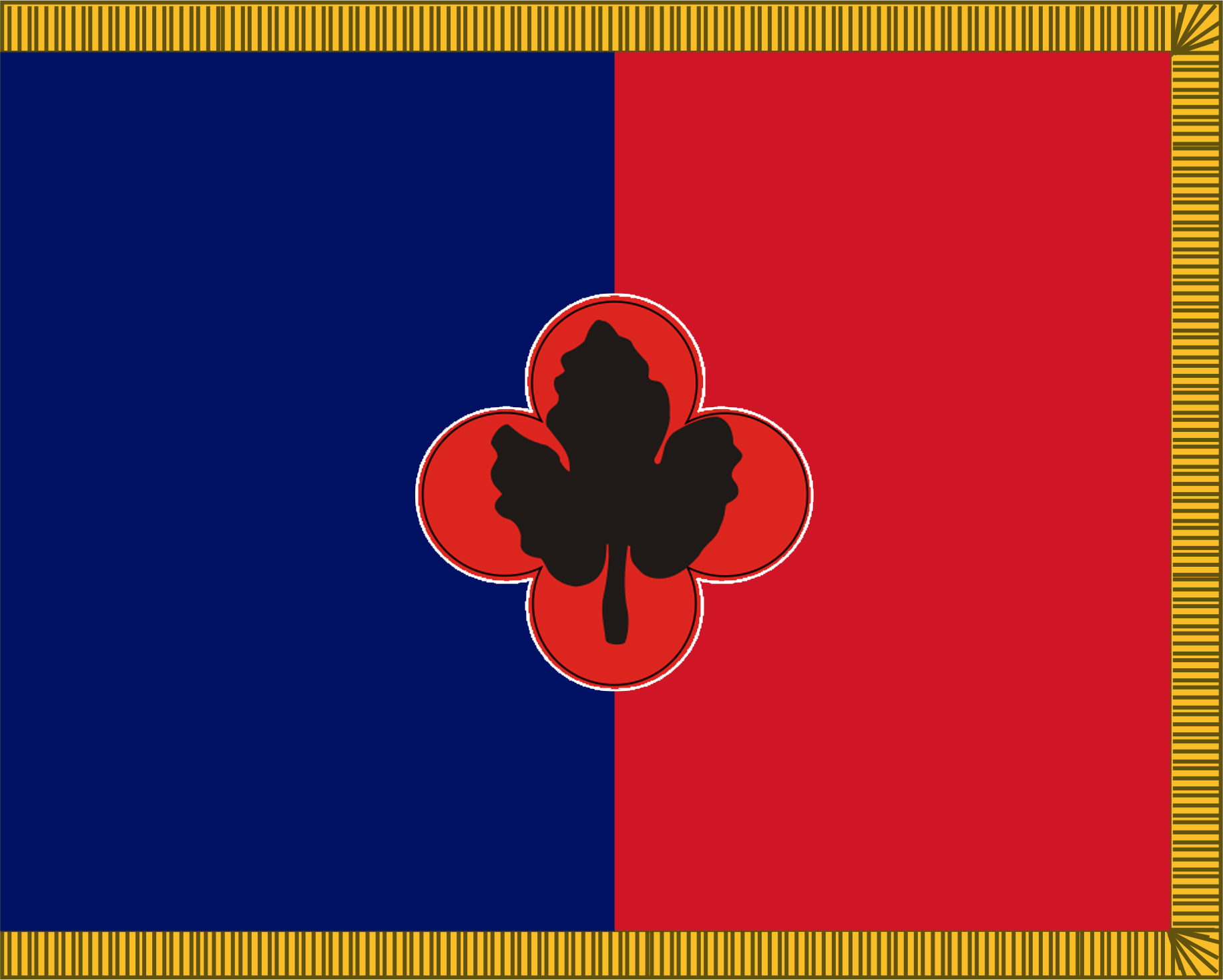
43rd Infantry Brigade Flag

The 43d Infantry Division was inactivated on 1 May 1963 as a result of National Guard restructuring. Its headquarters was reorganized as Headquarters Company, 43rd Brigade, 26th Infantry Division. The 43rd Brigade was relieved from assignment to the 26th Division on 1 September 1993, when the 26th Division was inactivated. It was then reorganized as Headquarters Company, 43rd Infantry Brigade. It was then reorganized for a short time as a Field Artillery Brigade.

It was reorganized and redesignated as the Headquarters and Headquarters Company, 143rd Area Support Group on 30 September 1997 in the Connecticut Army National Guard.

The unit became a Regional Support Group in 2020 after a deployment to Jordan. The change from Area to Regional was not considered a redesignation and had no formal ceremony other than an uncasing of their unit colors after turning over their base support mission to their relief.

== Current Organization ==
- 143rd Regional Support Group, in Middletown
  - Headquarters and Headquarters Company, 143rd Regional Support Group, in Middletown
  - 118th Medical Battalion (Multifunctional), in Middletown
    - Headquarters and Headquarters Detachment, 118th Medical Battalion (Multifunctional), in Middletown
    - 141st Medical Company (Ground Ambulance), in Middletown
    - 142nd Medical Company (Area Support), in Danbury
  - 143rd Combat Sustainment Support Battalion, in Waterbury
    - Headquarters and Headquarters Company, 143rd Combat Sustainment Support Battalion, in Waterbury
    - 102nd Army Band, in Rockville
    - 130th Public Affairs Detachment, in Waterbury
    - 906th Quartermaster Platoon (Field Feeding), in Waterbury
    - 1048th Transportation Company (Medium Truck) (Cargo), in Enfield
  - 192nd Engineer Battalion, in Stratford
    - Headquarters and Headquarters Company, 192nd Engineer Battalion, in Stratford
    - Forward Support Company, 192nd Engineer Battalion, in Stratford
    - 246th Engineer Detachment (Fire Fighting Team — Fire Truck), in East Lyme
    - 247th Engineer Detachment (Well Drilling), in Norwich
    - 248th Engineer Company (Engineer Support Company), in Norwich
    - 250th Engineer Company (Multirole Bridge), in New London
    - 256th Engineer Detachment (Fire Fighting Team — Fire Truck), in East Lyme

== Recognition ==
U.S. Route 7 is signed as the 43rd Infantry Division Memorial Highway between Norwalk and Danbury, CT. Vermont Route 100 is signed as the 43 Infantry Division Highway.
