= 172nd Cavalry Regiment =

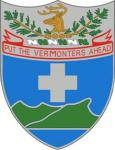
- 172nd Cavalry Regiment distinctive unit insignia
- Active: 1861–present
- Country: United States
- Branch: United States Army
- Type: Armored cavalry
- Size: One battalion
- Engagements: American Civil War; World War I; World War II; War on terror

The 172nd Cavalry Regiment is an armored cavalry regiment of the Vermont Army National Guard, with one battalion currently active. First organized in 1861, the regiment has seen combat in the American Civil War, World War I, World War II, and the war on terror. Originally an infantry regiment, elements of the unit were consolidated with an antiaircraft unit in 1959 and converted into an armored regiment. In 1964, the remainder of the 172nd Infantry was consolidated with the 172nd Armor, as an armored regiment.

In 2007, the regiment was retitled cavalry. In 1982, a new infantry unit designated the 172nd Infantry Regiment was organized in the Vermont Army National Guard, but it does not share the lineage of the previous 172nd Infantry/Cavalry, only the numerical designation.

== History ==
=== American Civil War ===
On 19 April 1861, a regiment of infantry was constituted in the Vermont Militia from volunteer companies (the Green Mountain Guards at Swanton the Woodstock Light Infantry at Woodstock the Ransom Guards at St. Albans the Bradford Guards at Bradford, the Cavendish Light Infantry at Cavendish, the New England Guards at Norhfield, the Allen Greys at Brandon, the Howard Guards at Burlington, the Union Guard at Middlebury. and the Rutland Light Guard at Rutland, designated on 27 May as the 1st Regiment, Vermont Volunteers, and mustered into federal service as a three months regiment on 9 May at Rutland. It was mustered out of federal service on 15 August 1861 at Brattleboro and was reorganized as militia companies. Several of these companies formed the 12th Regiment, Vermont Volunteers, organized from 12 August-25 September 1862 and mustered into federal service 4 October 1862 at Brattleboro. The regiment was mustered out of federal service 14 July 1863 at Brattleboro, and reorganized 22 November 1864 in the Vermont Militia as the 1st Brigade, of the 1st, 2nd, 3rd, and 4th Infantry Regiments.

=== Spanish-American War ===
During the Spanish-American War, the 1st Vermont Volunteer Infantry was mustered into federal service on 16 May 1898 at Burlington, and mustered out of federal service 26 October–7 November 1898 and resumed state status.

=== Pancho Villa Expedition and World War I ===
Mustered into Federal service 22 June 1916 at Fort Ethan Allen, Vermont; mustered out of Federal service 9–11 October 1916 at Fort Ethan Allen, Vermont (Company B mustered into Federal service 30 March 1917 at St. Albans) Regiment (less Company B) mustered into Federal service 10 April 1917 at Fort Ethan Allen, Vermont; drafted into Federal service 5 August 1917 (1st Regiment, Vermont State Guard, organized 27 June 1917 to replace regiment in Federal service) Reorganized and redesignated 9 February 1917 as the 57th Pioneer Infantry Demobilized 4 March 1919 at Camp Devens, Massachusetts Consolidated 20 June 1917 with the 1st Regiment, Vermont State Guard, and with Companies D, E, and F, 101st Ammunition Train (organized 27 August 1917 from personnel of the 1st Infantry Regiment [Vermont] and elements of the Coast Artillery, Massachusetts National Guard, and assigned to the 26th Division; demobilized 3 May 1919 at Camp Devens, Massachusetts) and consolidated unit reorganized in the Vermont National Guard as the 1st Infantry.

=== Interwar period ===
On 22 February 1919, the 57th Pioneer Infantry was demobilized at Camp Devens, Massachusetts. On 25 June 1919, the headquarters of the 1st Infantry Regiment, Vermont National Guard was organized and federally recognized at Brattleboro.

The Headquarters Company was organized on 21 January 1922 at Brattleboro. The Howitzer Company was organized on 17 March 1922 at Bennington. The Service Company (less Band) was organized at Montpelier on 30 June 1921, while the Band was organized on 1 June 1922 at Brattleboro. The Medical Detachment was organized on 26 April 1920 at Burlington. The Headquarters Company, 1st Battalion, and Company A were organized at Rutland, Company B at Ludlow (13 June 1921), Company C at Lyndonville (18 April 1921), and Company D at St. Johnsbury (1 October 1919). The Headquarters Company, 2nd Battalion, was organized at Northfield, Company E at Bellows Falls (20 May 1920), Company F at Northfield (9 March 1921), Company G at Windsor (28 March 1921), and Company H at St. Albans (24 June 1919). The Headquarters Company, 3rd Battalion, was organized at Orleans (6 October 1921), Company I at Brattleboro (2 July 1920), Company K at Burlington (15 January 1920), Company L at Newport, and Company M at Barre (28 July 1921).

The initial assignment of the "172nd" designation to a unit of the Vermont National Guard by the War Department can be traced to 1 October 1921. On 10 April 1922, the 1st Infantry was redesignated the 172nd Infantry and was assigned to the 86th Infantry Brigade of the 43rd Division. The division also consisted of National Guardsmen from Connecticut, Maine, and Rhode Island. The regimental headquarters was relocated to St. Johnsbury, on 1 January 1929, to Northfield on 17 July 1930, to Rutland on 16 February 1933, to Bennington, on 1 September 1938, and back to Brattleboro in 1940.

Company H, 172nd Infantry was originally organized as the Machine Gun Company, 1st Infantry, but was redesignated Company H on 1 April 1921. Company M, 172nd Infantry, was first organized at Burlington on 15 January 1920. On 1 April 1921, it was redesignated Company K; a new Company M was subsequently organized at Barre. In fall 1939, howitzer companies in National Guard infantry regiments were disbanded. On 1 October, the Howitzer Company, 172nd Infantry, at Bennington, was redesignated as Company I, while on 2 October, the existing Company I at Brattleboro was absorbed as part of the Headquarters Company already in that city.

The 172nd Infantry was commanded by Colonel Ernest W. Gibson from 17 March 1922 – 17 December 1923, Colonel John W. Tinker from 27 December 1923 – 28 December 1929, Colonel Murdock A. Campbell from 28 December 1929 – 16 February 1933, Colonel Leonard F. Wing from 16 February 1933 – 2 July 1938, and Colonel Reginald W. Buzzell from 2 July 1938 to November 1941. The 2nd Battalion was organized in December 1922 with faculty members of Norwich University and cadets of its ROTC program, and remained substantially organized as such until 1941. Regimental elements were called up for riot control during labor troubles at paper mills in Bellows Falls and Wilder from 25 July–5 August 1921, flood relief duty at Waterbury and Montpelier, from 3–21 November 192, riot control during a granite workers’ strike at Barre, 8 May–3 June 1930, and the 3rd Battalion performed flood relief duty at Bennington, Windsor and Brattleboro from 18 to 22 March 1936. The 172nd Infantry was inducted into federal service on 24 February 1941 and moved to Camp Blanding, Florida.

=== World War II ===
The regiment was subsequently organized as a Regimental Combat Team (RCT) for service in the Pacific. The new RCT comprised the 172nd Infantry Regiment, the 103rd Field Artillery Battalion and parts of ordnance, engineer, medical and signal units. The 172nd RCT almost saw disaster at Espiritu Santo, New Hebrides on 26 October 1942, when its troop transport, the liner SS President Coolidge, struck two U.S. mines in the harbor. The captain, realizing that the ship was lost, attempted to run it aground so that the troops could disembark. The ship sank, but the regiment got ashore with few casualties, to fight in the New Georgia Campaign, including during the Drive on Munda Point. It was inactivated on 1 November 1945 at Camp Stoneman, California.

=== Korean War ===
The 172nd Infantry was reorganized and federally recognized on 28 October 1946 with headquarters at Brattleboro. During the Korean War, it was ordered into active federal service 5 September 1950. On 29 January 1953, a duplicate unit, the 172nd Infantry (NGUS) was organized and federally recognized with headquarters at Montpelier. The original 172nd Infantry was released from federal service on 15 June 1954 with headquarters at Montpelier, and federal recognition was concurrently withdrawn from the 172nd Infantry (NGUS).

=== Cold War ===
On 1 March 1959, elements of the 172nd Infantry were consolidated with the 124th Antiaircraft Artillery Battalion to form the 172nd Armor, a parent regiment under the Combat Arms Regimental System consisting of the 1st Medium Tank Battalion and the 2nd Reconnaissance Squadron, elements of the 43rd Infantry Division (United States), and the 172nd Infantry, a parent regiment under the Combat Arms Regimental System, consisting of the 1st Battle Group, an element of the 43rd Infantry Division. On 1 April 1963, the 172nd Armor was reorganized with the 1st and 2nd Battalions, elements of the 86th Infantry Brigade. The 172nd Infantry was concurrently reorganized to consist of the 1st Battalion, an element of the 86th Infantry Brigade. The 172nd Armor and 172nd Infantry were consolidated on 1 April 1964 and designated as the 1st and 2nd Battalions, 172nd Armor, elements of the 86th Armored Brigade, and the 3rd Battalion. Reorganized 1 February 1968 to consist of the 1st and 2nd Battalions, elements of the 50th Armored Division. Reorganized 1 June 1988 to consist of the 1st and 2nd Battalions, elements of the 26th Infantry Division. The regiment was withdrawn on 1 May 1989 from the Combat Arms Regimental System and reorganized under the United States Army Regimental System with headquarters at St. Albans.

=== Twenty-first century ===
Later the regiment was:

- Redesignated 1 October 2005 as the 172d Armored Regiment
- Reorganized 17 February 2006 to consist of the 1st and 2d Battalions, elements of the 42d Infantry Division. Both battalions were released from active Federal service in May 2006 and reverted to state control.
- Reorganized and redesignated 1 September 2007 as the 172d Cavalry Regiment, to consist of the 1st Squadron, an element of the 86th Infantry Brigade Combat Team

The former 2d Battalion had a separate lineage from that point onwards.

== Campaign credits ==
Battle honors earned by the current 172nd Cavalry and previous or consolidated units:

- American Civil War
  - Mississippi River
  - Gettysburg
  - Alabama 1865
  - Florida 1864
  - Louisiana 1862–1863
  - Virginia 1861–1862
- World War I
  - Champagne-Marne
  - Aisne-Marne
  - St. Mihiel
  - Meuse-Argonne
  - Ile de France 1918
  - Lorraine 1918
- World War II
  - New Guinea
  - Northern Solomons with arrowhead
  - Luzon with arrowhead
  - Rhineland
  - Central Europe
- War on Terrorism
  - Ramadi Iraq 2006
  - Parwan Providence Afghanistan 2010

== Decorations ==
- Army Presidential Unit Citation, streamer embroidered IPO DAM, LUZON, earned by the 2nd Battalion, 172nd Infantry)
- Army Meritorious Unit Commendation, streamer embroidered AFGHANISTAN 2010, earned by the 1st Squadron, 172nd Cavalry Regiment.
- Philippine Presidential Unit Citation, streamer embroidered 17 OCTOBER 1944 TO 4 JULY 1945, earned by the 172nd Infantry.
- Headquarters Company, 1st Squadron, additionally entitled to a Navy Unit Commendation, streamer embroidered ANBAR PROVINCE FEB –JUN 2006 (earned by Headquarters Company, 1st Battalion, 172nd Armored Regiment).
