= Mashamoquet Brook State Park =

State park in Windham County, Connecticut

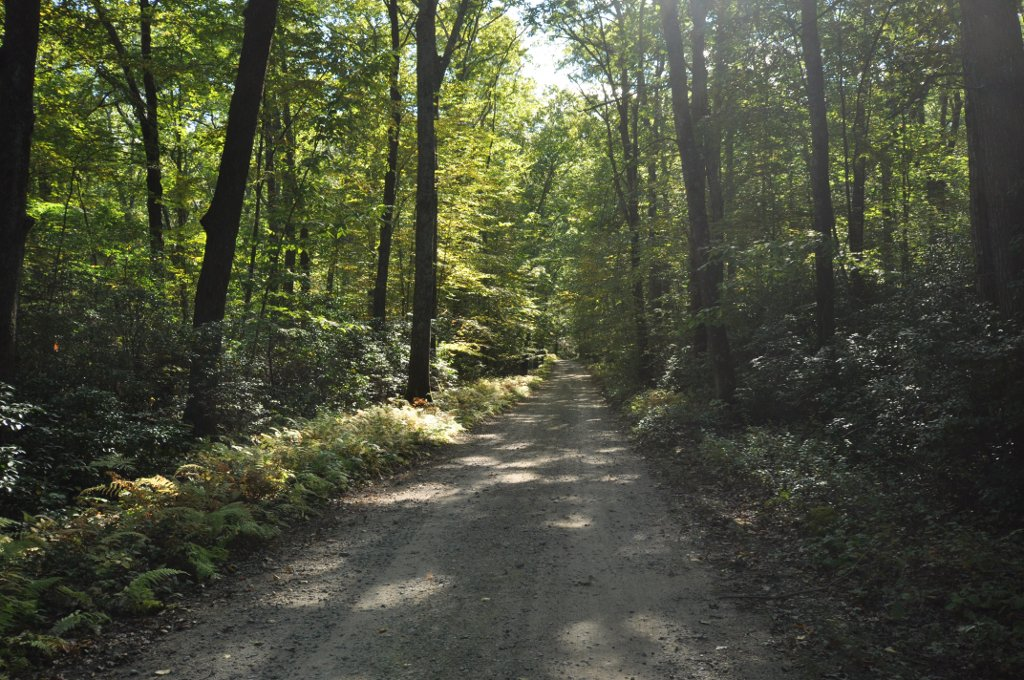

- Location within Connecticut Location within the United States
- Location: Pomfret, Connecticut, United States
- Coordinates: 41°51′04″N 71°59′05″W
- Area: 917 acres (371 ha)
- Elevation: 594 ft (181 m)
- Established: 1918
- Administrator: Connecticut Department of Energy and Environmental Protection
- Designation: Connecticut state park
- Website: Official website

Mashamoquet Brook State Park (/mæʃˈmʌkɪt -/ mash-MUH-kit) is a public recreation area in the town of Pomfret, Connecticut. Notable features of the state park include the Wolf Den national historic site, the Brayton Grist Mill, and the Table Rock and Indian Chair natural stone formations. The state park offers facilities for camping, swimming, fishing, and picnicking. It is managed by the Connecticut Department of Energy and Environmental Protection.

== History ==
Mashamoquet Brook first came to the attention of the State Park Commission when former Pomfret resident Sarah Fay donated eleven and a half acres of the stream's hemlock-lined gorge to the state in 1918. In 1925, that parcel was combined with the Wolf Den, site of Israel Putnam's legendary wolf slaying, which the Daughters of the American Revolution had purchased in 1899. The donation of the Hotchkins Wolf Den Farm parcel in 1957 together with other purchases and gifts brought the park to its present size of over 900 acres.
