= Bernard Ryan =

Bernard Ryan may refer to:

- Bernard Ryan (Irish republican) (c. 1901–1921), Irish revolutionary
- Bernard Ryan Jr. (1923–2020), American writer
- Bernie Ryan (1934–2017), Australian rules footballer
