= Henry U. Harder =

Adjutant general of Vermont

Henry Harder
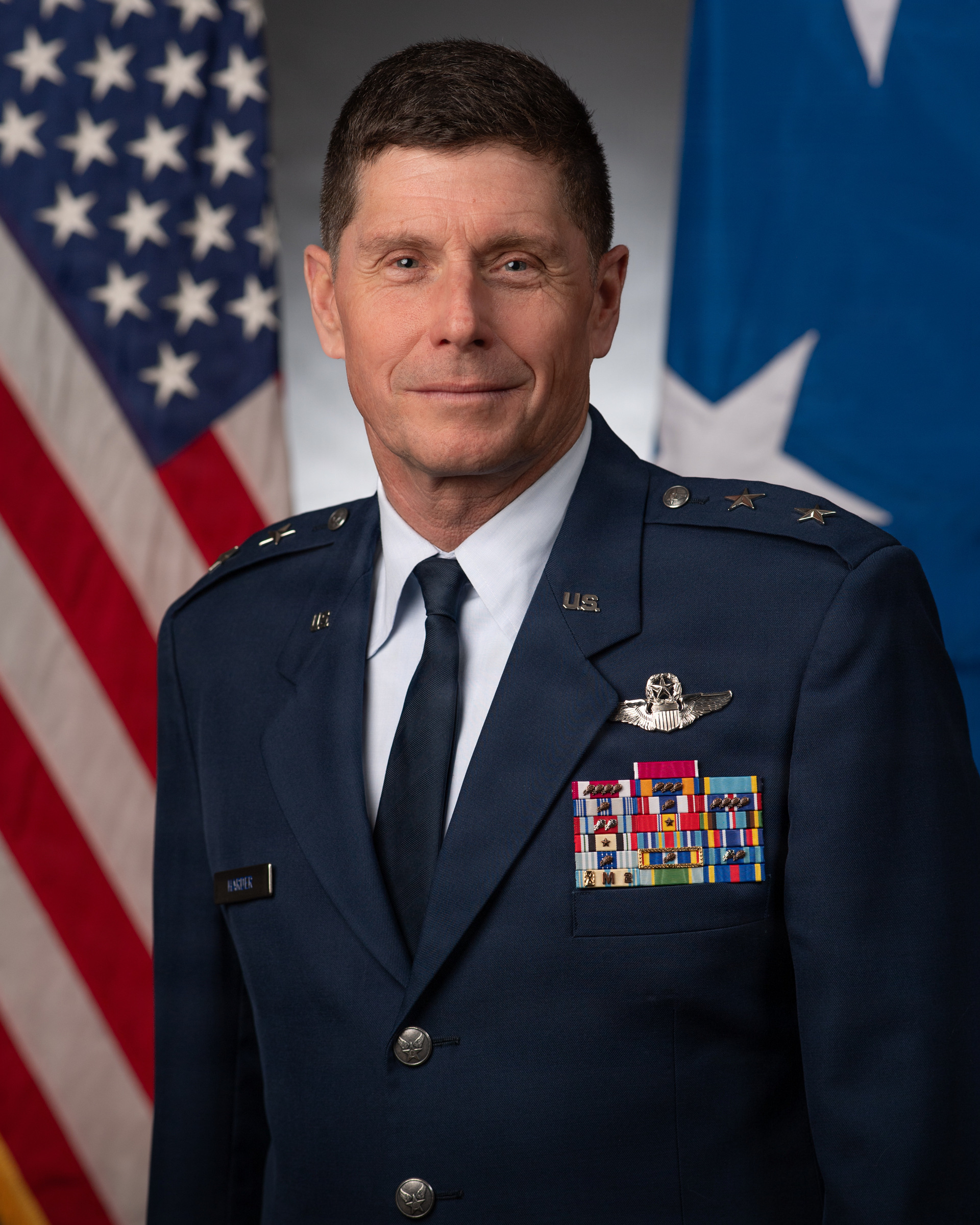
- Harder as adjutant general in 2026
- Born: 1965 (age 60–61); Greenwich, Connecticut, US
- Education: University of Vermont; Air Command and Staff College; Air War College
- Spouse: Natalie Rae Borrok (m. 1996)
- Children: 3
- Relatives: Isabel Rockefeller Lincoln (grandmother); Frederic W. Lincoln IV (grandfather)
- Military career
- Service: United States Air Force
- Service years: 1989–present
- Rank: Major General
- Nickname: Hank
- Unit: Vermont National Guard
- Commands: Flight Commander, 134th Fighter Squadron; 158th Operations Support Flight; 229th Information Operations Squadron; 158th Mission Support Group; Vermont Air National Guard; Adjutant General of Vermont
- Wars: Iraq War
- Awards: Legion of Merit; List
- Website: vt.public.ng.mil

Henry U. Harder (born 1965) is a career officer in the United States Air Force. A longtime member of the Vermont Air National Guard, he served as Vermont's assistant adjutant general for air from 2020 to 2025 and concurrently served as the deputy adjutant general from 2024 to 2025. From 2025 to 2026, he continued as deputy adjutant general. In February 2026, he was chosen by the Vermont General Assembly to succeed Gregory C. Knight as Adjutant General of Vermont.

== Early life ==
Henry Upham Harder Jr. was born in Greenwich, Connecticut in 1965, a son of Henry U. Harder Sr. and Calista (Lincoln) Harder. Harder's father was a United States Navy veteran of World War II who became the president and chief executive officer of Chubb & Son. His maternal grandparents were Isabel Rockefeller Lincoln and Frederic W. Lincoln IV. Percy Avery Rockefeller and Isabel Goodrich Stillman were his great-grandparents, and his great-great-grandparents were William Avery Rockefeller Jr. and Almira Geraldine Goodsell.

Harder was educated in Connecticut and graduated from Middletown, Rhode Island's St. George's School in 1983. He attended the University of Vermont (UVM) from 1983 to 1987, and graduated with a Bachelor of Arts degree in political science. In 1996, he received his graduate certificate as an education specialist from UVM. After his college graduation, Harder joined the Vermont Air National Guard; he completed the Academy of Military Science course as a distinguished graduate in 1989 and received his commission as a second lieutenant.

== Start of career ==
After receiving his commission, Harder attended Undergraduate Pilot Training at Williams Air Force Base, Arizona from March 1990 to April 1991, followed by F-16 pilot training at Kingsley Field Air National Guard Base, Oregon. From December 1991 to June 1997 he was assigned as an F-16 pilot with the 134th Fighter Squadron in Burlington, Vermont. He was the plans officer for the 158th Fighter Wing in Burlington from June 1997 to March 1998.

Harder's next posting was chief of safety for the 158th Fighter Wing, where he served until June 2002. In 1999, he completed the Squadron Officer School at Maxwell Air Force Base, Alabama by distance learning. Harder is rated as a command pilot, and he has logged more than 3,000 flight hours. Aircraft he has flown include the F-16A/B/C/D, AT-38, T38, and T37.

=== Family ===
In July 1996, Harder married Natalie Rae Borrok, a University of Florida graduate who worked as a journalist for Burlington's WCAX-TV. They reside in Shelburne and are the parents of three children, Haley, Henry, and Charles.

== Later career ==
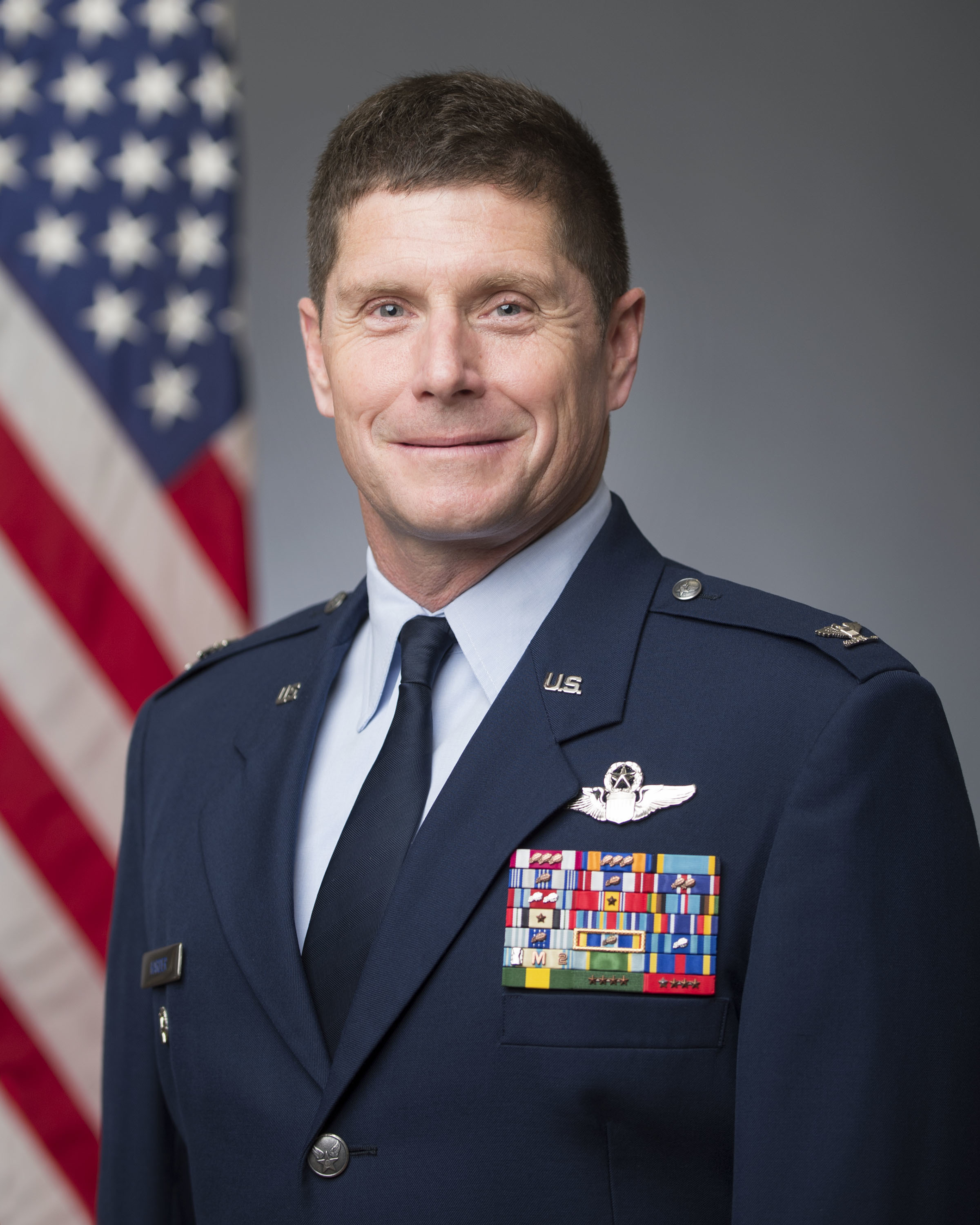
Harder as a colonel in 2018

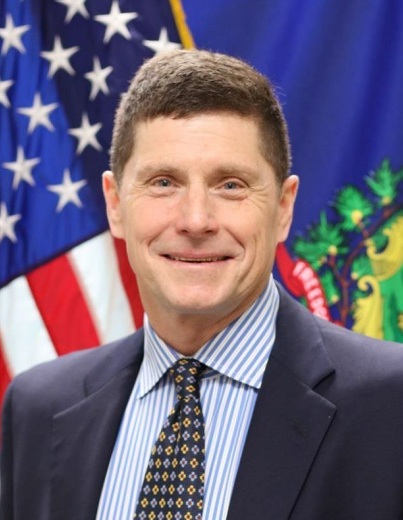
Harder as deputy adjutant general in 2025

From June 2002 to June 2004, Harder was assigned as operations plans officer for the 134th Fighter Squadron. In 2004, he completed the distance learning course at Maxwell Air Force Base's Air Command and Staff College. From June 2004 to March 2008, he was a flight commander for the 134th Fighter Squadron. Harder served as commander of the 158th Operations Support Flight from April 2008 to January 2010. In February 2010, Harder was assigned as commander of the 229th Information Operations Squadron, where he remained until September 2013. In 2013, he completed the Air War College distance learning course. Harder served in the Iraq War and logged more than 300 combat flight hours during his four tours.

Harder served as director of communications and cyber at the Vermont National Guard's Joint Force Headquarters (JFHQ–VT) from October 2013 to March 2014. In 2014, he completed the Cybersecurity Executive Education Seminar at the Harvard Kennedy School. He was then assigned as director of the air staff at JFHQ–VT, where he served until February 2016. Harder next commanded the 158th Mission Support Group, where he served until June 2017. In 2017, Harder completed Leadership for Strategic Impact, an on-campus executive program for senior leaders at Dartmouth College's Tuck School of Business. From June 2017 to July 2019, Harder served as vice commander of the 158th Fighter Wing. He was assigned to the Air Force's Retired Reserve from August 2019 to January 2020.

In January 2020, Harder received promotion to brigadier general and assignment as Vermont's assistant adjutant general for air. In 2021, he completed the United States Northern Command's Dual Status Commander's Course at Peterson Space Force Base, Colorado. In June 2023, he was assigned as commander of the Vermont Air National Guard. In January 2024, he was appointed deputy adjutant general, a state position in which he served while continuing to serve as assistant adjutant general. In 2024, he attended the Africa Regional Seminar in Washington, D.C. that was presented by Alan L. Freed Associates. In July 2025, he received promotion to major general and he retired as assistant adjutant general in August while continuing in the deputy adjutant general's role. In February 2026, Harder won the Vermont General Assembly election for a two-year term (March 2026 to March 2028) to succeed Major General Gregory C. Knight as Adjutant General of Vermont.

== Awards ==
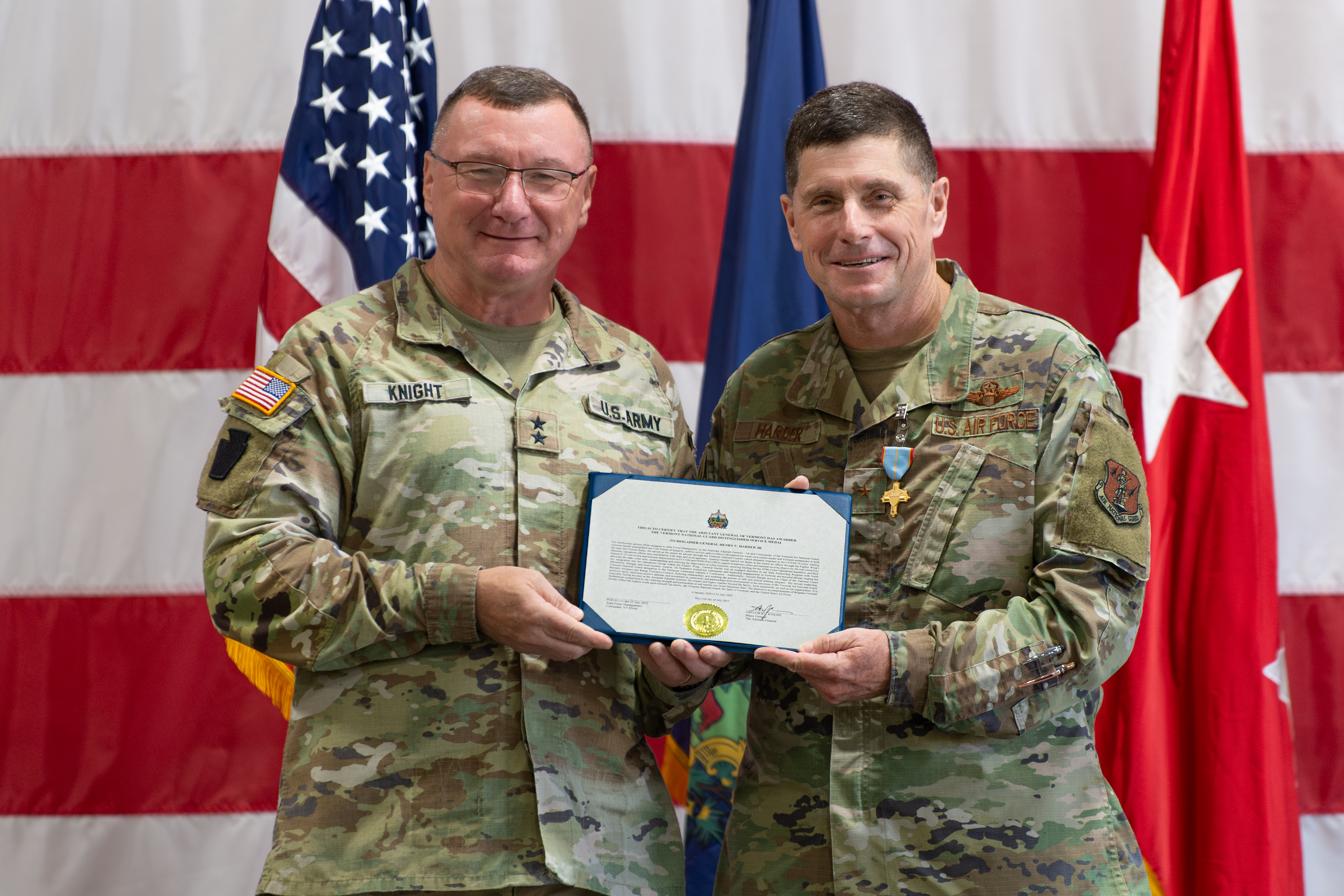
Harder receiving the Vermont Distinguished Service Medal in 2025

Harder's awards include:

- Legion of Merit
- Meritorious Service Medal with 4 oak leaf clusters
- Air Medal with 3 oak leaf clusters
- Aerial Achievement Medal
- Air Force Achievement Medal with oak leaf cluster
- Meritorious Unit Award with oak leaf cluster
- Air Force Outstanding Unit Award with 2 oak leaf clusters
- Combat Readiness Medal with two silver oak leaf clusters
- National Defense Service Medal with bronze service star
- Iraq Campaign Medal with bronze service star

== Promotion dates ==
Harder's effective dates of rank are:

- Second Lieutenant, 21 December 1989
- First Lieutenant, 21 December 1992
- Captain, 7 January 1995
- Major, 11 September 1999
- Lieutenant Colonel, 8 June 2005
- Colonel, 22 May 2014
- Brigadier General, 2 January 2020
- Major General, 31 July 2025
