= Avery Rockefeller =

American investment banker and conservationist

- Born: September 11, 1903; Manhattan, New York
- Died: May 22, 1986 (aged 82); Overhills, North Carolina
- Education: Yale University
- Occupation: Banker
- Spouse: Anna Griffith Mark (m. 1923)
- Children: 3
- Parent: Percy Avery Rockefeller
- Relatives: See Rockefeller family

Avery Rockefeller (September 11, 1903 – May 22, 1986) was an American investment banker and conservationist who was a member of the Rockefeller family.

== Early life ==
Rockefeller was born on September 11, 1903, to Percy Avery Rockefeller and Isabel Goodrich Stillman. His paternal grandparents were William Avery Rockefeller Jr. and Almira Geraldine Goodsell. His maternal grandfather was James Jewett Stillman (1850–1918), the chairman of the board of directors of the National City Bank. His father's brother, William Goodsell Rockefeller (1870–1922), married his mother's sister, Elsie Stillman (1872–1935).

He attended Yale University, graduating in 1926.

== Career ==
In 1928, Rockefeller joined the storied J. Henry Schroder Banking Corporation and became Assistant Treasurer in 1931.

On July 8, 1936, Rockefeller co-founded Schroder, Rockefeller & Co., Inc. Its purpose was to take over the underwriting and general securities business formerly carried out by the J. Henry Schroder Banking Corporation. The firm had a capital of $3,000,000. Its first President, Carlton P. Fuller, was former vice president of the J. Henry Schroder Banking Corporation. The original stock holders were Rockfeller, Fuller, Gerald E. Donovan, John. L. Simpson, Frederick B. Adams and the J. Henry Schroder Banking Corporation itself. He served as vice president and later president of Schroder, Rockefeller & Co.

In 1961, James E. Madden was appointed as president and Avery Rockefeller was appointed as chairman of the board. Rockefeller retired in 1967 and the company was merged into the J. Henry Schroder Banking Corporation.

In 1950, he was elected a director of J. Henry Schroder Banking Corporation, and served until 1970. He was also a director of the Air Reduction Company, the J. Henry Schroder Bank & Trust Company.

=== Philanthropy ===
Rockefeller founded the Wild Wings Foundation, a conservation organization with projects in Belize and the Adirondacks.

== Personal life ==
On September 20, 1923, Rockefeller secretly married Anna Griffith Mark (1906–1996), whose father was steel manufacturer Clayton Mark (1858–1936). Following the marriage, the newlyweds eloped, planning to complete their education before telling their parents. However, the arrival of their first child in 1924 forced them to reveal the marriage. By his wife Anna he had three children:

- Avery Rockefeller Jr. (1924–1979), who married Lucia Peavy Ewing, daughter of Sherman Ewing, in 1948.
- Ann Rockefeller (b. 1926 – d. 2023), who married Edward Scales Elliman (1923–2009), son of Douglas Elliman, president of the same real estate company.
- Joan Rockefeller (1931–1992), who married David Hunter McAlpin Jr. (1928–2022), a minister, in 1953.

Avery, like his father, had a large collection of jewelry and valuable items. In 1935, Avery's home was looted of jewelry, only a few years after his father's house had been looted.

Rockefeller died of a heart attack at his home in Overhills, North Carolina on May 22, 1986.
