= Pomfret Town House =

- U.S. National Register of Historic Places
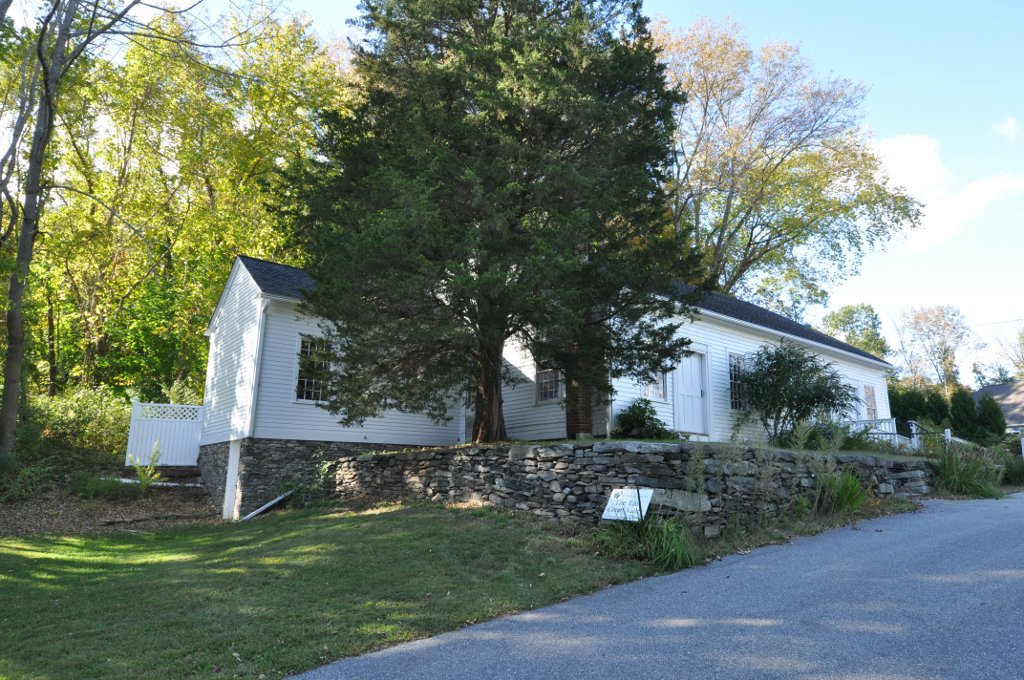

- Location within Connecticut Location within the United States
- Location: 17 Town House Road, Pomfret, Connecticut
- Coordinates: 41°51′53″N 71°57′50″W
- Area: less than one acre
- Built: 1841
- NRHP reference No.: 88003221
- Added to NRHP: January 19, 1989

Pomfret Town House is an historic town hall at 17 Town House Road in Pomfret, Connecticut. Built in 1841, it is one of the state's oldest surviving purpose-built town halls. It served that function for many years, and is now maintained by the local historical society as a museum and society meeting hall. The building was listed on the National Register of Historic Places in 1989.

== Description and history ==
The Pomfret Town House is located in the village of Pomfret Center, on the west side of Town House Road. It is a modest single-story wood frame structure with a gable roof and clapboard siding. Its main facade features two entrances, each with simple molded surrounds, and five windows with plain framing. The interior is a large open space, clad in narrow wood flooring that covers original wide board floors. A small ell extends to one side, and there is a 19th-century privy on the grounds.

The town of Pomfret was incorporated in 1713. For many years its town meetings were held in local churches and other buildings. In 1831, calls began to be made for a dedicated town hall for such meetings. Disputes within the community about where to locate the building prompted the town to retain a council composed of members from neighboring towns to decide the issue. The three-man council chose this spot, roughly midway between Pomfret Center and Abington, two of the town's larger villages. This building was erected in 1841 and was used for many years as the site of Pomfret's town meetings. It is now owned by the Pomfret Historical Society.

== See also ==
- National Register of Historic Places listings in Windham County, Connecticut
