= Frederic W. Lincoln IV =

American businessman (1898–1968)

- Born: Frederic Walker Lincoln IV; October 15, 1898; New York City, U.S.
- Died: April 7, 1968 (aged 69); New York City, U.S.
- Education: Pomfret School
- Alma mater: Princeton University
- Spouse: Isabel Rockefeller (m. 1925)
- Children: 4
- Parent: Frederic Walker Lincoln III
- Relatives: Frederic W. Lincoln Jr. (grandfather)
- Military career
- Allegiance: United States
- Branch: United States Army Signal Corps; United States Navy Reserve
- Rank: Commander
- Conflicts: World War I; World War II

Frederic Walker Lincoln IV (15 October 1898 – 7 April 1968) was chairman of the board of trustees of the New York Medical College and the Flower and Fifth Avenue Hospital who married into the Rockefeller family.

== Early life ==
Frederic Walker Lincoln IV was born on October 15, 1898, in New York City to Philena and Frederic Walker Lincoln III. His father was a distant cousin of Abraham Lincoln. His paternal grandparents were Emily Caroline Lincoln and Frederic W. Lincoln Jr., the former mayor of Boston, Massachusetts, during the Civil War. Together, his parents had five children, of which he was the only boy:

- Florence Lincoln (1897–1998), who married William A. Rockefeller (1896–1973) in 1918. After their divorce, she married George Sloan (died 1955), chairman of the board of the Metropolitan Opera Association. After his death, she married H. Bartow Farr (died 1972) in 1959. He was a partner in the law firm Willkie Farr & Gallagher.
- Frederic Walker Lincoln IV (1898–1968).
- Mary Knight Lincoln (1898–1974), who married W. Stapley Wonham (1898–1973) in 1923.
- Philena Hope Lincoln (1901–1993), who married Reginald G. Coombe (1895–1976) in 1922.
- Emily Caroline Lincoln (1906–1991), who married Sidney Lanier (1902–1986) in 1927, the grandson of poet Sidney Lanier (1842–1881).

He was educated at Pomfret School and then Princeton University, where he graduated in 1921.

== Military service and career ==
He joined his father's export-import firm H. W. Peabody & Co., of which he became a partner, until World War II began. He enlisted as a sergeant in the aviation section of the Army Signal Corps and fought in World War I. He joined his father's export-import firm H. W. Peabody & Co., of which he became a partner, until World War II began and he joined the Naval Air Reserve, retiring with the rank of Commander.

Lincoln was chairman of the board of trustees of the New York Medical College and the Flower and Fifth Avenue Hospital, retiring in 1965. In the same year, he was awarded an honorary degree from the New York Medical College.

== Personal life ==
On September 26, 1925, at Christ Episcopal Church in Greenwich, Connecticut, he was married by Rev. John Lewis Lincoln to Isabel Rockefeller (1902–1980), daughter of Percy Avery Rockefeller (1878—1934), and granddaughter of William Rockefeller (1841–1922) and James Jewett Stillman (1850–1918). Together, Frederic and Isabel had four daughters:

- Isabel Lincoln, who married Basil B. Elmer
- Calista Lincoln (died 2012), who married Henry U. Harder
- Percy Lincoln, who married William B. Chappell
- Florence Lincoln, who married Thomas L. Short

Lincoln died at his home at 941 Park Avenue on April 7, 1968, in New York City. He also had a home in Deerpark, Greenwich, Connecticut.
