= Isabel Rockefeller Lincoln =

Rockefeller family member

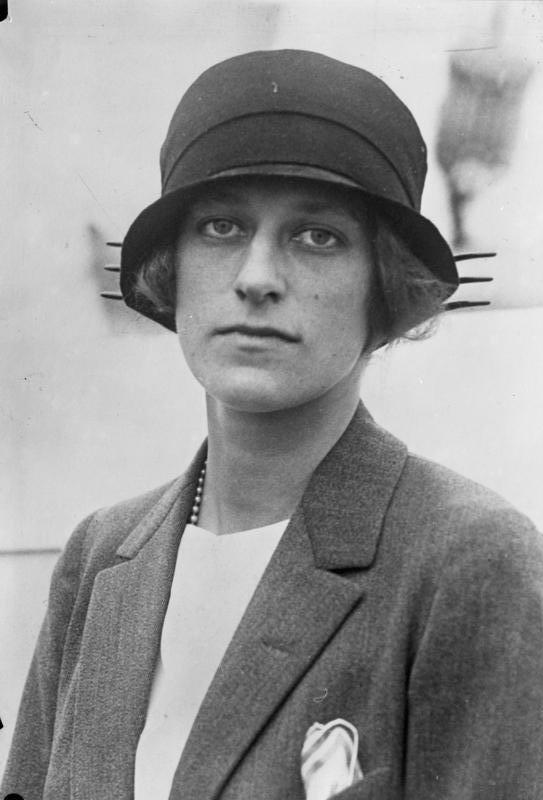
- Lincoln in 1930
- Born: Isabel Stillman Rockefeller; June 23, 1902
- Died: March 23, 1980 (aged 77)
- Education: Westover School
- Alma mater: Columbia University
- Spouse: Frederic W. Lincoln IV (m. 1925; died 1968)
- Children: 4
- Parent(s): Percy Avery Rockefeller; Isabel Goodrich Stillman
- Family: Rockefeller family

Isabel Stillman Rockefeller (June 23, 1902 – March 23, 1980) was a member of the Rockefeller family.

== Early life and education ==
Isabel was born on June 23, 1902, to Percy Avery Rockefeller (1878–1934) and Isabel Goodrich Stillman. Percy Rockefeller, a financier and industrialist, was a son of Standard Oil co-founder William Avery Rockefeller Jr. (1841–1922) and Almira Geraldine Rockefeller. He was also a nephew of Standard Oil co-founder John Davison Rockefeller. Isabel Stillman was a daughter of James Jewett Stillman (1850–1918), a banker, and Sarah Elizabeth Rumrill. Together Percy and Isabel had five children:

- Isabel Stillman Rockefeller (1902–1980)
- Avery Rockefeller (1903–1986)
- Winifred Rockefeller (1904–1951)
- Faith Rockefeller (1909–1960)
- Gladys Rockefeller (1910–1988)

She attended Westover School and was a member of Junior League, of which she took an active part. She became a member of the advisory board and helped produce a play called Ready Made. She also performed singing and dancing numbers. She studied bacteriology at Columbia University for three years, and then went to Europe for 5 months with her mother. She was a frequent face in New York City high society after her introduction as a debutante in 1920.

Lincoln was a member of the board of trustees St. Luke's–Roosevelt Hospital Center (Mount Sinai Morningside as of 2020) from 1956 until her death in 1980.

== Personal life ==
In June 1925, it was announced that she would marry Frederic W. Lincoln IV. Her double cousin William Avery Rockefeller III (1896–1973) was married to a sister of Frederic. The day before Isabel's marriage to Mr. Lincoln, a large party was held in their honor by William Avery Rockefeller III. The wedding was held on September 26, 1925, at Christ Episcopal Church in Greenwich, Connecticut, by Rev. John Lewis. The day after the wedding, the newlyweds were again honored at a large function at the Field Club of Greenwich. A week-long honeymoon in Buenos Aires followed in November. Isabel and Frederic had four daughters:

- Isabel Lincoln (1927–2016), who married Basil B. Elmer in 1951
- Calista Lincoln (1930–2012), who married Henry U. Harder in 1952 and was the mother of Henry U. Harder Jr.
- Percy Lincoln, who married William B. Chappell
- Florence Lincoln, who married Thomas L. Short

Lincoln died on March 23, 1980.

== See also ==
- Rockefeller family
