= Brayton Grist Mill =

- U.S. National Register of Historic Places
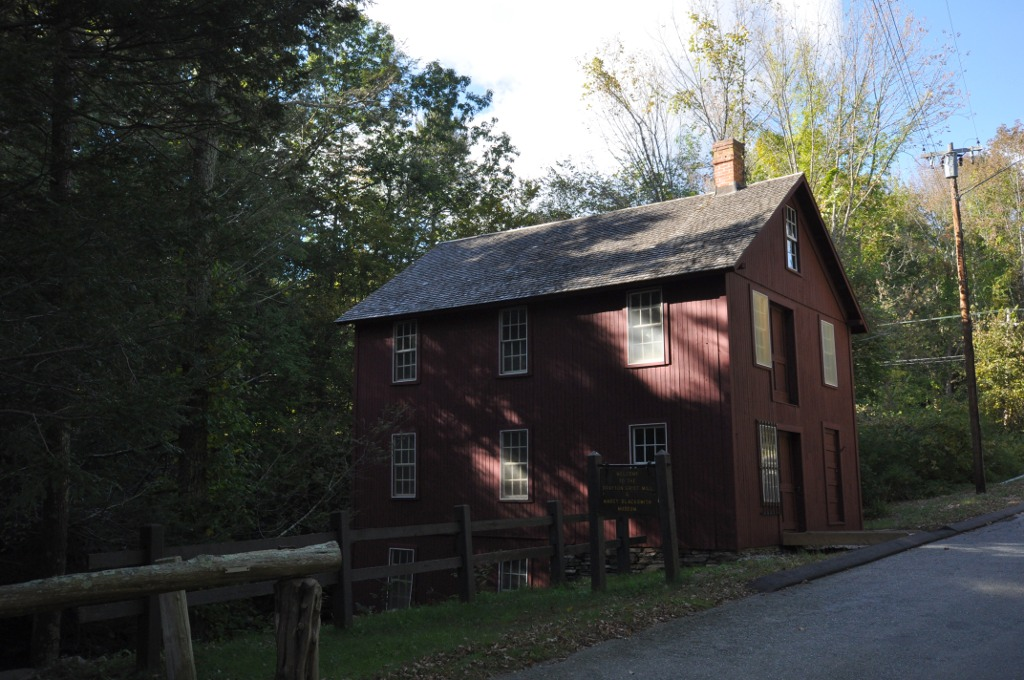

- Location within Connecticut Location within the United States
- Location: Mashamoquet Brook State Park, Pomfret, Connecticut
- Coordinates: 41°51′39″N 71°58′57″W
- Area: 2 acres (0.81 ha)
- Built: 1890
- NRHP reference No.: 86001257
- Added to NRHP: June 13, 1986

Brayton Grist Mill is a historic grist mill along Mashamoquet Brook in Pomfret, Connecticut. The mill was built about 1890 and is one of the best-preserved 19th-century rural grist mills in the state. It was listed on the National Register of Historic Places in 1986. It has been restored and is maintained by the Pomfret Historical Society as the Marcy Blacksmith Museum, which is open by appointment.

The mill is located near the geographic center of Pomfret, on the west side of the entrance road to Mashamoquet Brook State Park, just south of United States Route 44. It is a vernacular post-and-beam frame structure, four stories high, with a gabled roof and clapboarded exterior. The mill's power equipment includes a 19th-century turbine mounted in a wooden frame in the basement, reinforced with cast iron tie rods. The second level of the mill houses equipment for gearing the turbine's power shaft down to equipment working speed. The third level houses milling equipment patented in 1888 and 1890. It now also houses a collection of blacksmithing tools and equipment.

This mill was built by William Brayton around 1890 from materials salvaged from older mills that were on the site. It is the last surviving mill of several that are known to have lined Mashamoquet Brook in the area. Brayton died in 1928, and the state purchased the property in 1930 as part of an enlargement of the state park.

== See also ==
- National Register of Historic Places listings in Windham County, Connecticut
