= Rectory School =

School in Pomfret, Connecticut, US

Coordinates: 41.894°N 71.9631°W

- Pomfret, Connecticut; United States

Information
- Type: Independent, Boarding
- Motto: Respect, Responsibility, Honesty, and Compassion
- Established: 1920
- Head of school: Julie M. Anderson
- Faculty: 65
- Grades: K-9
- Enrollment: 230
- Student to teacher ratio: 4:1
- Campus: 528 Pomfret Street, Pomfret, Connecticut
- Colors: Black and Orange
- Newspaper: The DiRectory
- Website: www.rectoryschool.org

The Rectory School is an independent, coeducational, junior boarding (5–9) and day school (K–9) in Pomfret, Connecticut. The school was founded by the Rev. Frank H. Bigelow in 1920. It has expanded to 138 acres (0.56 km^{2}), 26 buildings, 250 students, and 65 faculty members as of 2017.

Rectory's campus is located on Connecticut Route 169, immediately north of the Pomfret School.

== Academics ==
All students must receive education in music. The school requires that students take classes on various genres of music, and many choose to supplement this with private lessons arranged by the school. Every student also takes part in sports on levels that test the skilled athlete and encourage the beginner.

Rectory's Individualized Instruction Program (IIP) provides students in need of extra support with daily one-on-one assistance from an assigned faculty tutor. Students meet with their tutors within the regular rotation of classes during the academic day, when their peers are in study hall. The program is customized to each student, helping students with language disorders develop skills in language and reading comprehension, foreign-language students master English, and students with attention-deficit disorders develop study habits and accountability.

The Rectory School is accredited by the Connecticut Association of Independent Schools and the National Association for the Education of Young Children, and approved by the Connecticut State Board of Education. Memberships include the National Association of Independent Schools, The Connecticut Association of Independent Schools, the Association of Boarding Schools, and the New England Preparatory School Athletic Council.

== Athletics ==
Students are required to participate in the sports program every trimester. The school fields numerous teams for most sports so that students can play at a level appropriate to them.

Fall athletic offerings

- Cross Country
- Karate
- Equestrian
- Soccer
- Volleyball
- Football

Winter athletic offerings

- Basketball
- Fencing
- Ice hockey
- Squash
- Swimming
- Fitness

Spring athletic offerings

- Baseball
- Golf
- Lacrosse
- Softball
- Tennis
- Track and field

== Notable alumni ==
- Terrence Clarke - basketball player and NBA Draft prospect
- Robert Ludlum - author best known for the Jason Bourne novels
- William Reese "Will" Owsley III - Grammy-nominated musician
- Peter L. Pond - clergyman, activist and philanthropist
- Peter Kellogg - businessman and philanthropist
- Julian Roosevelt - Olympic gold medalist
- Bernard Ryan Jr. - writer
- Oscar Tang - financier and philanthropist
- Jeremy Thorpe - British politician who served as leader of the Liberal Party
- Gabriel Traversari - Nicaraguan-American actor, director, writer, singer & songwriter
- Christian Vital (born 1997) - basketball player in the Israeli Basketball Premier League
