= Pomfret Street Historic District =

Historic district in Connecticut, United States

- U.S. National Register of Historic Places
- U.S. Historic district
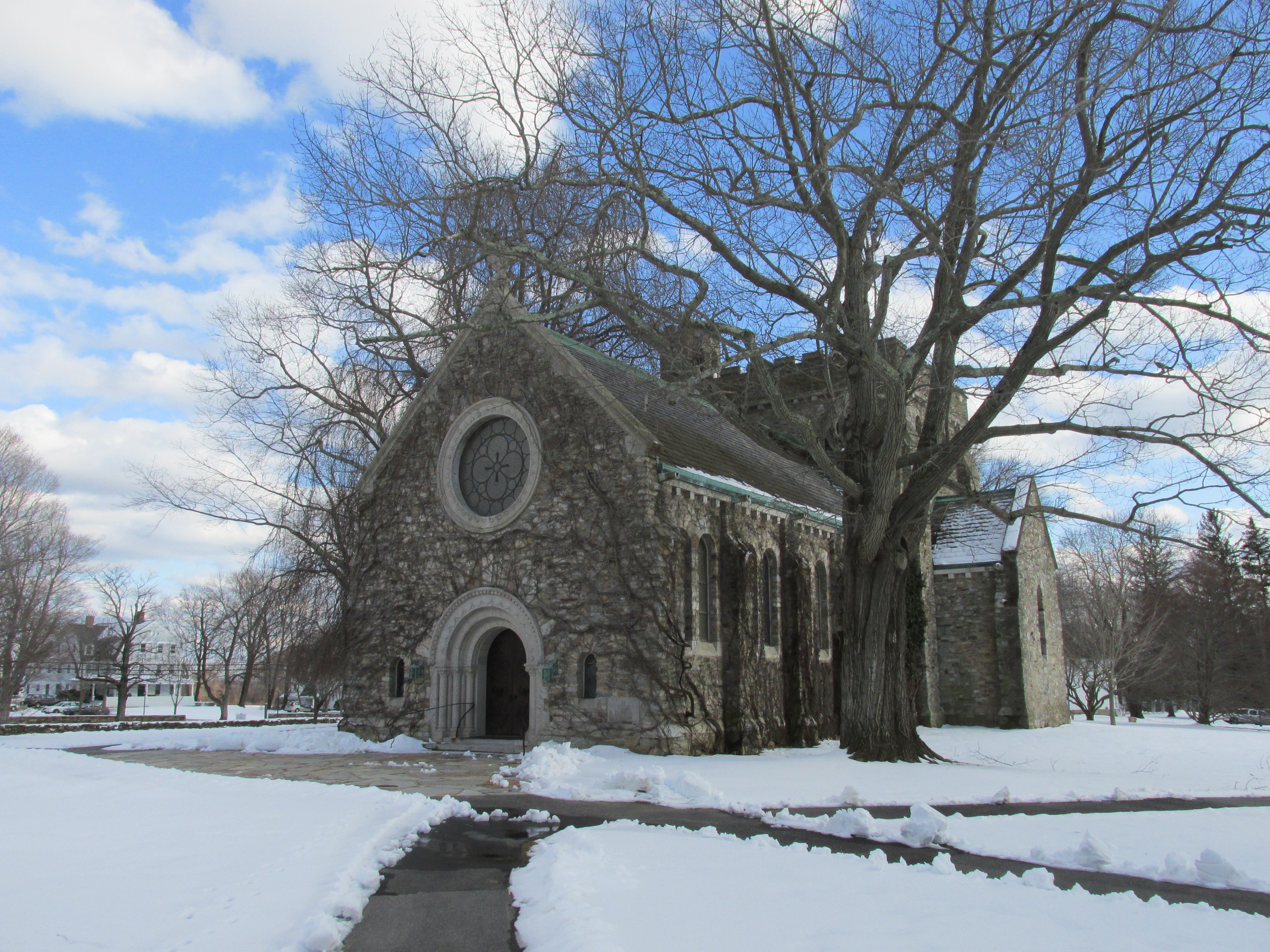
- Clark Memorial Chapel, Pomfret School

- Location within Connecticut Location within the United States
- Location: Roughly along Pomfret Street and CT 169, from Bradley Road to Woodstock Road, Pomfret, Connecticut
- Coordinates: 41°53′19″N 71°57′51″W
- Area: 380 acres (150 ha)
- Architect: Howard Hoppin; Ernest Flagg
- Architectural style: Colonial, Mid 19th Century Revival, Late Victorian
- NRHP reference No.: 98000372
- Added to NRHP: April 23, 1998

The Pomfret Street Historic District is a historic district roughly along Pomfret Street (Route 169), from Bradley Road to Woodstock Road in Pomfret, Connecticut, United States. The district represents the core of the village of Pomfret Center.

he district was added to the National Register of Historic Places in 1998, and it includes 160 contributing buildings and two other sites. The district is over 380 acres and has an irregular shape. It is about two miles long.

The district contains two private schools. The Rectory School is a junior boarding school founded in 1920. Its main building is a converted house, built in 1792, once belonging to Col. Thomas Grosvenor (1744-1825). It has a large addition and alterations by Thomas Skelton Harrison (1837-1919), designed by Guy King of Philadelphia. The campus includes other houses, including Brittain House c.1800, and Marion Harvey/Harrison Deal House, by Guy King c.1900.

Pomfret School was founded in 1894 on the estate of Charles Grosvenor. It now includes brick Georgian and Colonial Revival buildings built during the first decade of the 20th century, designed by New York architect Ernest Flagg, including the Romanesque 1908 Clark Chapel.

Architect Howard Hoppin (1854-1940) designed several buildings in the district, including guest houses for George Lothrop Bradley (1848-1906) on his estate called Rathlin: Hope Cottage, Harry Cottage, Howard Cottage, Lothrop Cottage, and alterations to Stilleben and Darius Cottages. Hoppin also designed the Joseph Washington Clark (1810-1892) house called La Plaisance in 1888, Oberthal (later Southover) for Dr. Frederick Windle Chapin, a house for Joseph Clark's daughter, Mrs. Courtland Hoppin, now Robinson House, the school's admissions office. He also designed Christ Church and its adjacent rectory.

The Ben Grosvenor Inn grounds and outbuildings are in the district, but the Inn itself was demolished in 1960. Remaining buildings include Orchard Cottage and Olive Cottage, now used as dormitories by Pomfret School.

The Colman estate house dates from 1928.

Notable properties in the district include:

- Most Holy Trinity Church, 1887, moved to its current location at Pomfret Street and Deerefield Road in 1973
- Pomfret School's Admissions Building, Mrs. Courtland Hoppin, c.1888, moved north from its original site c.1899
- Pomfret School's Headmaster's House, built by Charles Grosvenor (1839-1922) as Eastover c.1896, as an Inn
- Pomfret School's Clark Chapel, Ernest Flagg 1907/8
- Pomfret School's School House, Ernest Flagg 1906/7
- Pomfret School's four brick dormitories, Dunworth, Pontefract, Plant & Bourne, and the campus plan, by Ernest Flagg.
- Thomas Hubbard House
- Grosvenor Inn Cottages, 29 and 33 Grosvenor Road
- Joseph W. Clark Estate House, La Plaisance, c.1888
- Coleman Estate House, 1928
- Christ Church Episcopal, 1881, and Rectory, <1886.
- Bradley Estate's Hope Cottage, c.1882
- Bradley Estate's Howard Cottage, c.1882
- Bradley Estate's Harry Cottage, c. 1882

== See also ==
- National Register of Historic Places listings in Windham County, Connecticut
