= Gregory C. Knight =

United States Army officer

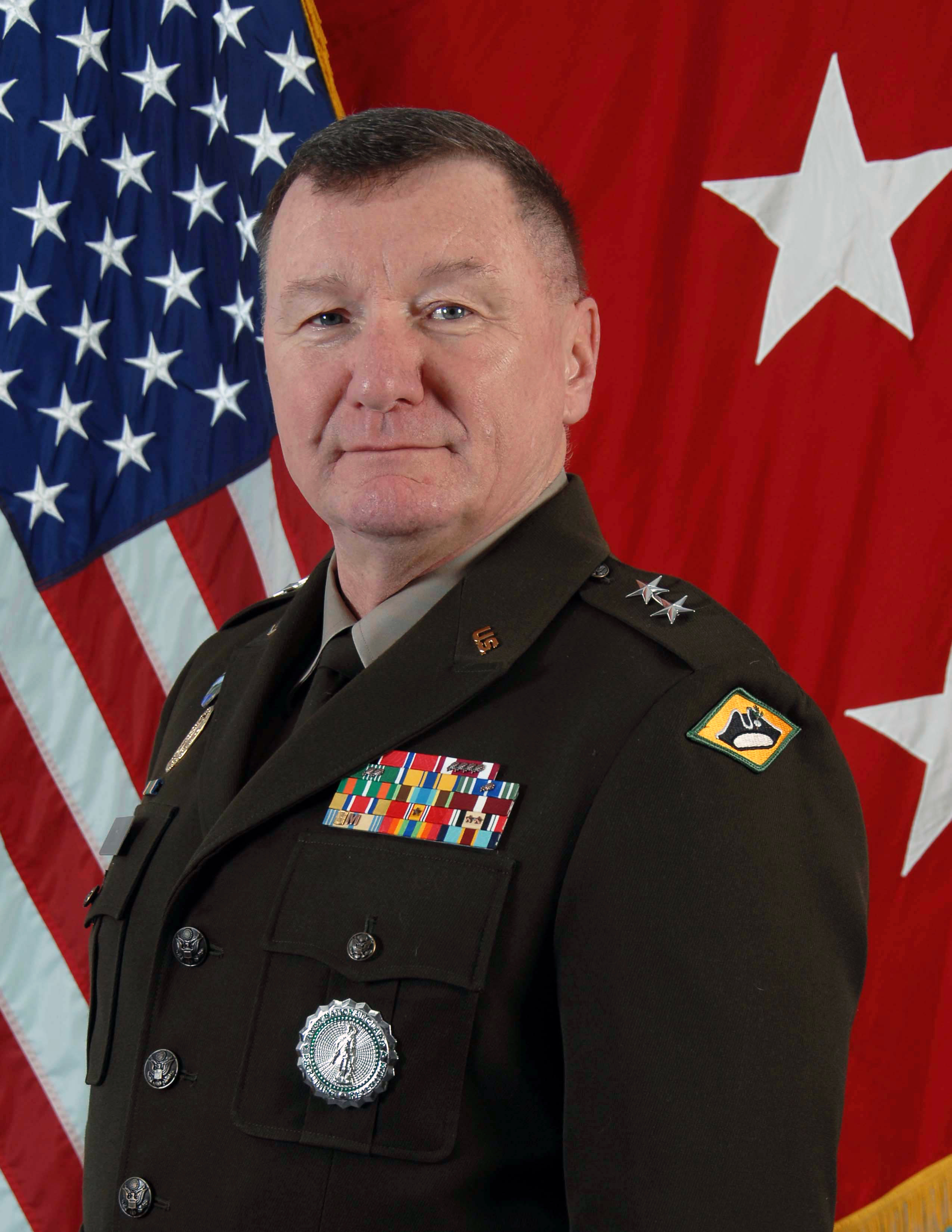
- Born: October 1, 1962 (age 64); Fairfax, Virginia
- Education: Community College of Vermont (AA); Johnson State College (BA); Post University (MS); Naval War College (MA)
- Military career
- Allegiance: United States
- Branch: United States Coast Guard; United States Air Force; United States Army
- Service years: 1983–2026
- Rank: Major General
- Unit: Vermont National Guard
- Commands: Vermont National Guard; 124th Regiment (Regional Training Institute); Vermont Army National Guard Recruiting and Retention Battalion; Company B, 1st Battalion, 172nd Armor
- Conflicts: Iraq War: Occupation of Ramadi; Battle of Ramadi
- Awards: Army Distinguished Service Medal; Legion of Merit; Bronze Star Medal (See list)
- Other work: Law enforcement officer
- Website: VT Guard.com

Gregory C. Knight (born October 1, 1962) is a United States Army officer. In 2019, he was selected to serve as Adjutant General of Vermont. He held this post until retiring in March 2026.

== Early life ==
Gregory Clark Knight was born in Fairfax, Virginia on October 1, 1962, the son of Walter and Lotte Knight. In 1980, he graduated from Groveton High School in Alexandria, Virginia. After completing high school, Knight served in the United States Coast Guard. Upon moving to Vermont, Knight worked as a police officer for the city of Burlington and as chief investigator for the state Department of Liquor Control. He also served in the Vermont Air National Guard as a Security Forces specialist. Knight graduated from officer candidate school in 1997 and received his commission as a second lieutenant in the Vermont Army National Guard.

== Education ==
Knight received an associate degree in liberal studies from the Community College of Vermont in 1998. In 2001 he received his Bachelor of Arts degree in history from Johnson State College. In 2015, he received a Master of Arts degree in education from Post University. Knight's military education includes the Armor Officer Basic Course, Armor Captain's Career Course, and United States Army Command and General Staff College. In 2016, he received a master of arts degree in National Security and Strategic Studies from the Naval War College.

== Early career ==
After receiving his commission, Knight served initially as a platoon leader with Vermont's Military Police detachment. He was then assigned as an Armor platoon leader with Company C, 1st Battalion, 172nd Armor in Morrisville.

In 2000, Knight became a full-time member of the National Guard when he was selected for a position in the Active Guard Reserve program. His initial assignment was support platoon leader for 1st Battalion, 172nd Armor in St. Albans. From 2001 to 2005, Knight was commander of Company B, 1st Battalion, 172nd Armor in Enosburg Falls.

== Service in Iraq ==
Knight served in the Iraq War in 2006 and 2007. From January 2005 to January 2006, he was assigned as assistant plans, operations and training officer (S-3 Air) for 1st Battalion, 172nd Armor in Ramadi. From January 2006 to June 2006, Knight was assigned as a task force battle captain (headquarters staff leader and supervisor) for 1st Battalion, 172nd Armor. During its service in Iraq, 1-172 was organized as part of 2nd Infantry Brigade Combat Team, 28th Infantry Division, and took part in the occupation of Ramadi and the 2006 Battle of Ramadi. Knight received the Bronze Star Medal and the Iraq Campaign Medal with two service stars.

== Continued career ==
After returning from Iraq, Knight was assigned as plans, operations and training officer (S-3) for 1st Squadron, 172nd Cavalry Regiment in St. Albans; in 2006, Vermont's 86th Brigade was converted from Armor to Infantry and 1-172 Armor was reorganized as a cavalry squadron. In 2007, Knight was promoted to major and assigned as S-3 for the 86th Brigade's Special Troops Battalion in Rutland. From 2008 to 2012, Knight commanded the Vermont Army National Guard's Recruiting and Retention Battalion, and he was promoted to lieutenant colonel in 2012.

From 2012 to 2015, Knight was assigned as deputy commander of Vermont's 124th Regiment (Regional Training Institute). He attended the Naval War College from 2015 to 2016, after which he was assigned as the Vermont Army National Guard's deputy chief of staff for personnel (G-1). He was promoted to colonel in 2017, and in 2018 he was assigned as commander of the 124th Regiment while serving concurrently as the Vermont National Guard's human resources officer - the manager of the organization's full-time staff.

== Adjutant general ==
In 2018, incumbent adjutant general Steven A. Cray announced his intention to retire from the military. In Vermont, the adjutant general is elected for a two-year term in a secret ballot of the Vermont General Assembly. At the time, the election took place in February of each odd-numbered year for a term that began in March. The major candidates for the position after Cray's retirement were Knight and David Baczewski, a retired Vermont Air National Guard brigadier general. Two other candidates also joined the race—retired Army Lieutenant Colonel David Graham, a former member of the Vermont Army National Guard, and Colonel (Retired) Rosanne Greco, a longtime member of the United States Air Force and resident of South Burlington who ran to protest the Air Force's plan to base F-35 fighter jets in Vermont.

Winning the General Assembly vote requires a majority—91 votes if all 30 senators and 150 house members cast ballots. When lawmakers voted on February 21, 2019, 176 were present. Knight won the election on the first ballot with 95 votes, while Baczewski received 58, Greco 21, and Graham 2. Knight succeeded Cray in March and received a state promotion to brigadier general. In June 2020, he was nominated for federal recognition of this promotion. He was federally recognized as a brigadier general on July 30, 2020. In February 2021, the Vermont General Assembly unanimously reelected Knight for a second term.

In 2022, the General Assembly passed legislation moving the election of the adjutant general to February of each even-numbered year beginning in 2024, with the two-year term to begin in March. In addition, the legislation includes qualifications candidates for the position must possess, including: having attained the rank of colonel; be a currently serving member of the U.S. Army, U.S. Air Force, U.S. Army Reserve, U.S. Air Force Reserve, Army National Guard, or Air National Guard, or be eligible to return to service in the Army or Air National Guard; be a graduate of a Senior Service College; and be eligible for federal recognition as a general officer. In February 2024, Knight ran unopposed for a two-year term and was unanimously elected. In 2026, Henry U. Harder won the legislative election to succeed Knight.

== Assignment history ==
Knight's assignments since receiving his commission include:

14. March 2019 – March 2026, The Adjutant General, Joint Force Headquarters, Camp Johnson, Colchester, Vermont
13. May 2018 - February 2019, Commander, 124th Regiment (Regional Training Institute), Camp Johnson, Colchester, Vermont
12. July 2016 - May 2018, Deputy Chief of Staff for Personnel (G-1), Vermont Army National Guard, Joint Force Headquarters, Colchester, Vermont
11. July 2015 - June 2016, Student, United States Naval War College, Newport, Rhode Island
10. October 2012 - July 2015, Deputy Commander, 124th Regiment (Regional Training Institute), Camp Johnson, Colchester, Vermont
9. September 2008 - September 2012, Commander, Recruiting and Retention Battalion, Vermont Army National Guard, Camp Johnson, Colchester, Vermont
8. June 2007 - September 2008, Plans Operations and Training Officer (S-3), Headquarters and Headquarters Company, Brigade Special Troops Battalion (BSTB), 86th Brigade, Rutland, Vermont
7. June 2006 - June 2007, Plans, Operations and Training Officer (S-3), Headquarters and Headquarters Troop, 1st Squadron, 172nd Cavalry, St. Albans, Vermont
6. January 2006 - June 2006, Task Force Battle Captain, Headquarters and Headquarters Company, 1st Battalion, 172nd Armor, Ramadi, Iraq
5. January 2005 - January 2006, Assistant Plans, Operations and Training Officer (S-3 Air), Headquarters and Headquarters Company, 1st Battalion, 172nd Armor, Ramadi, Iraq
4. June 2001 - January 2005, Commander, Company B, 1st Battalion, 172nd Armor, Enosburg Falls, Vermont
3. June 2000 - May 2001, Support Platoon Leader, Headquarters and Headquarters Company, 1st Battalion, 172nd Armor, St. Albans, Vermont
2. May 1998 - May 2000, Tank Platoon Leader, Company C, 1st Battalion, 172nd Armor, Morrisville, Vermont
1. August 1997 - May 1998, Platoon Leader, Detachment 1, 42nd Military Police Company, Berlin, Vermont

== Effective dates of promotion ==
Knight's effective dates of promotion are:

1. Second Lieutenant, August 24, 1997
2. First Lieutenant, November 30, 1999
3. Captain, February 7, 2002
4. Major, August 28, 2007
5. Lieutenant Colonel, April 6, 2012
6. Colonel, May 1, 2017
7. Brigadier General (Vermont), March 8, 2019
8. Brigadier General, July 30, 2020
9. Major General (Vermont), 30 July 2020
10. Major General, 30 November 2022

== Awards ==
Knight's awards include:

- Army Distinguished Service Medal
- Legion of Merit
- Bronze Star Medal
- Meritorious Service Medal (with 4 Bronze Oak Leaf Clusters)
- Army Commendation Medal (with 2 Bronze Oak Leaf Clusters)
- Air Force Commendation Medal
- Army Achievement Medal (with 1 Bronze Oak Leaf Cluster)
- Coast Guard Achievement Medal
- Coast Guard Commandant's Letter of Commendation Ribbon
- Navy Unit Commendation
- Coast Guard Good Conduct Medal
- Army Reserve Components Achievement Medal
- National Defense Service Medal (with 1 Bronze Service Star)
- Iraq Campaign Medal (with 2 Campaign Stars)
- Armed Forces Reserve Medal (with Silver Hourglass and "M" device)
- Army Service Ribbon
- Army Overseas Service Ribbon
- Basic Recruiting and Retention Badge
- German Armed Forces Badge for Military Proficiency (Gold)

== Family ==
Knight has been married to the former Tracy Rooney since 1994. They have four children and reside in Huntington.

== Photos ==
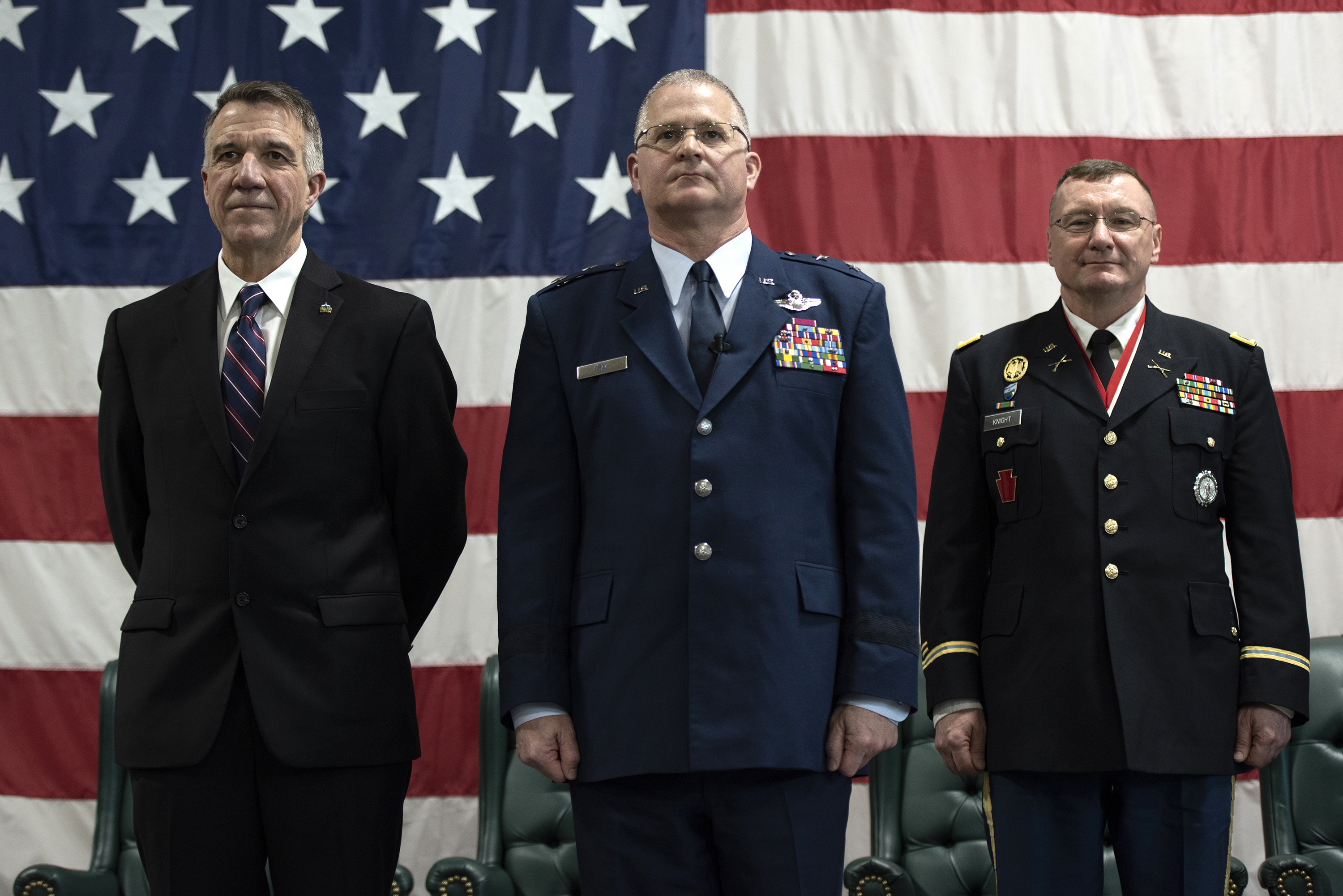
Knight preparing to assume command of the Vermont National Guard in March 2019 with predecessor Steven Cray and Governor Phil Scott

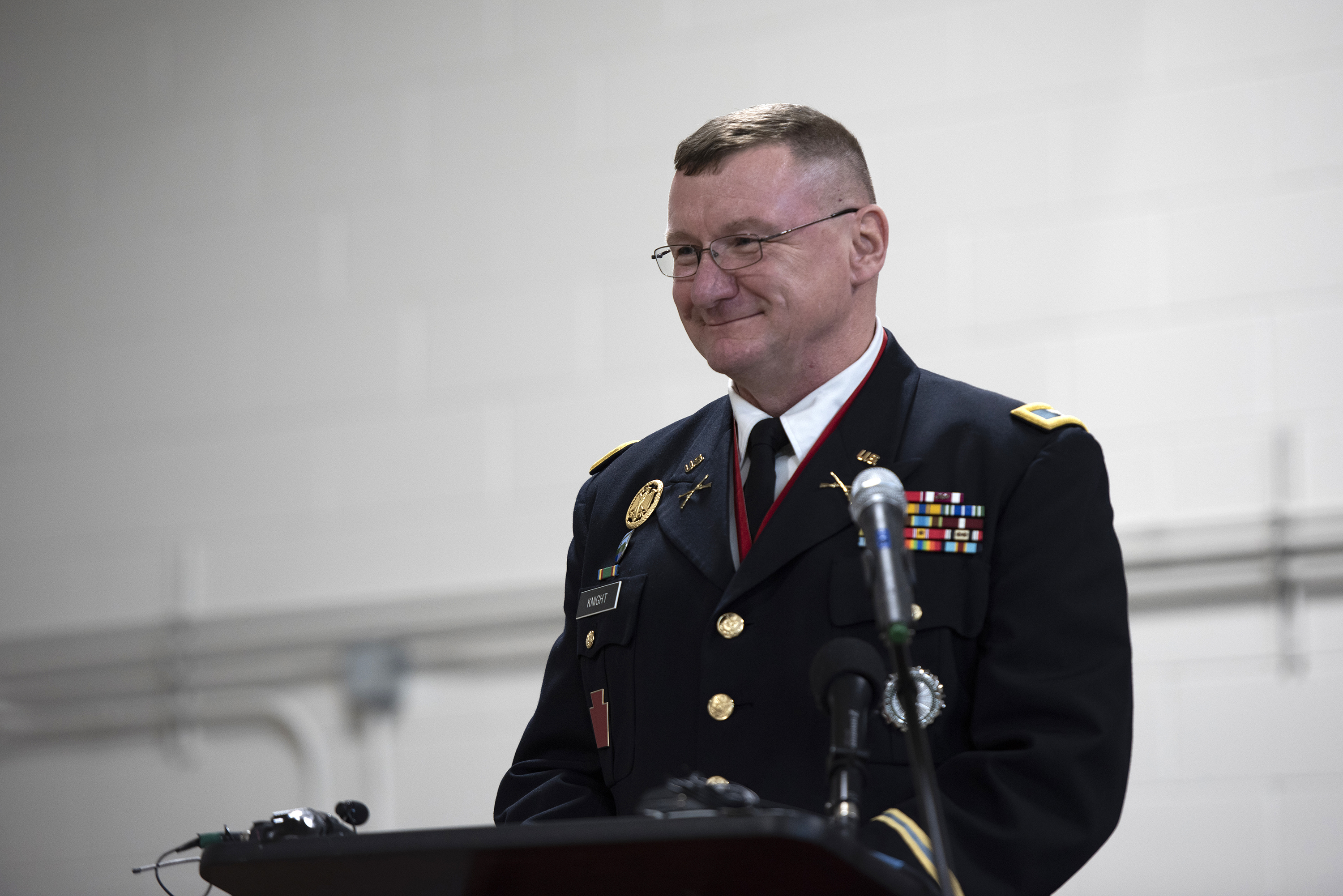
Knight speaking shortly after taking over as adjutant general in March 2019

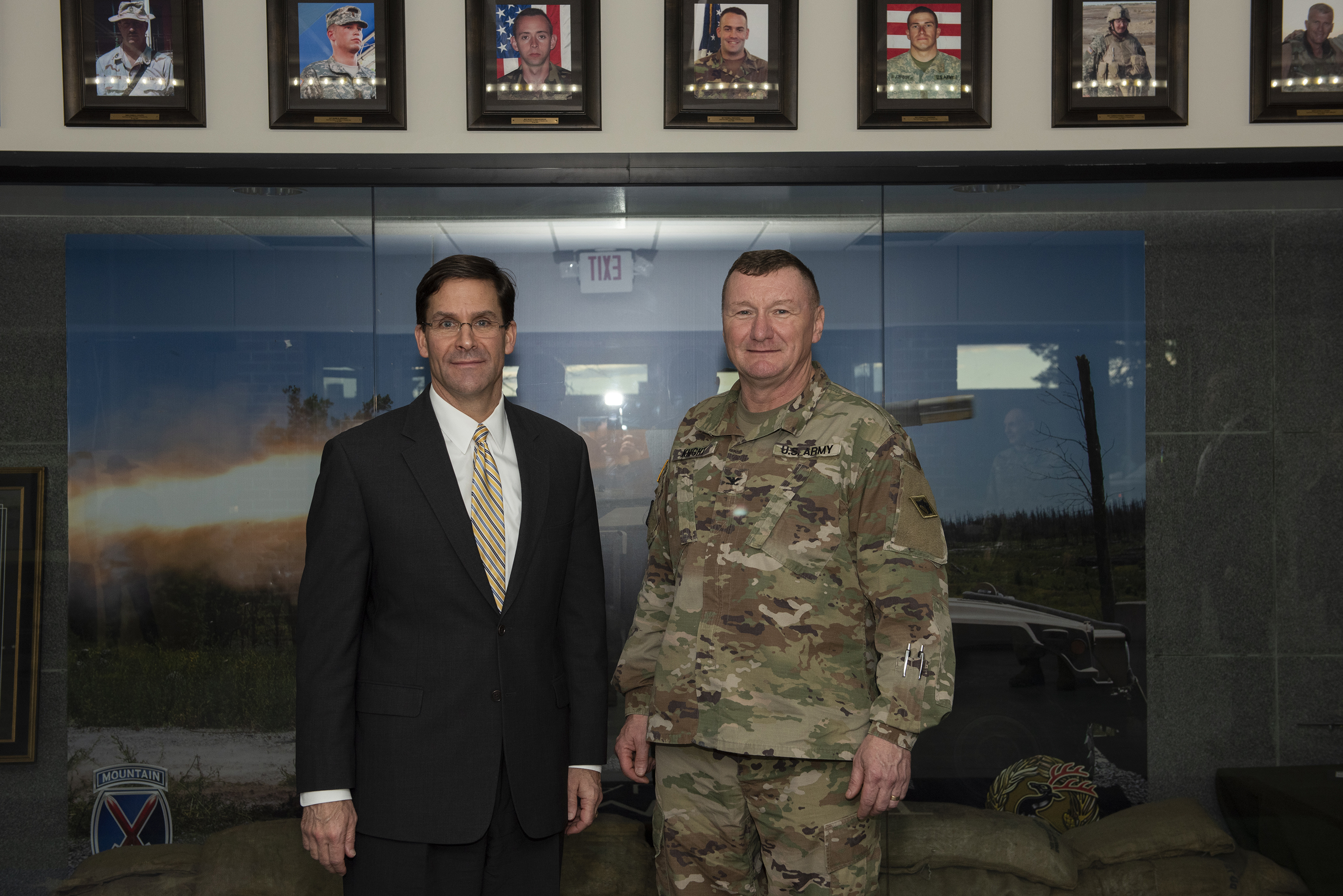
Knight meets with Secretary of the Army Mark Esper in 2019
