= Gwyn Careg =

Historic house in Connecticut

- U.S. National Register of Historic Places
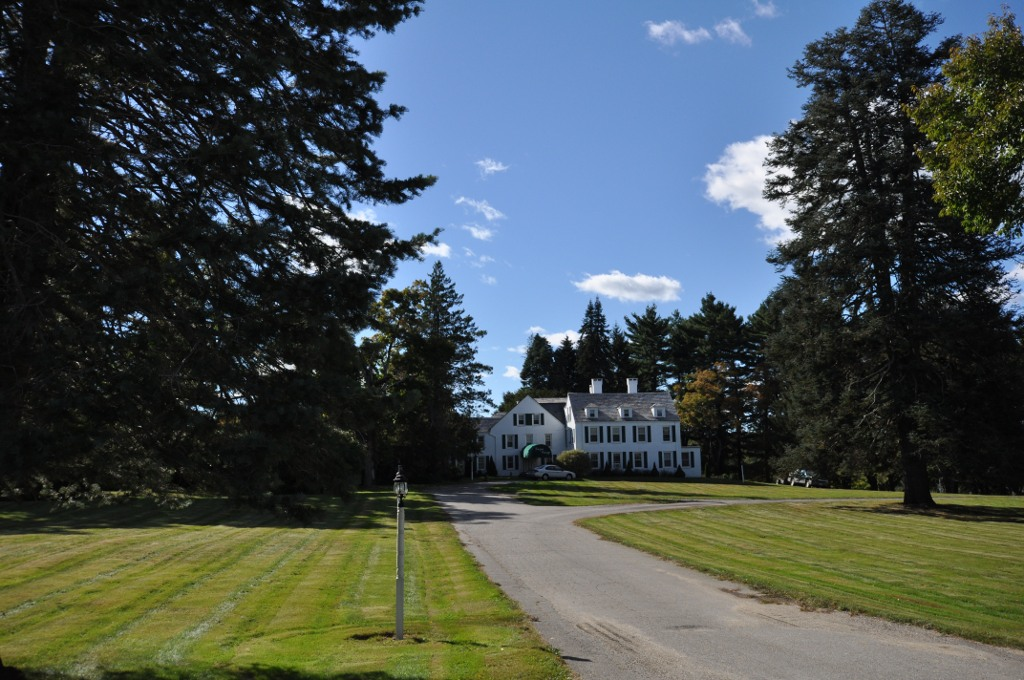

- Location within Connecticut Location within the United States
- Location: 68 Wolf Den Road, Pomfret, Connecticut
- Coordinates: 41°51′20″N 71°59′52″W
- Area: 30 acres (12 ha)
- Architect: Jackson, William
- Architectural style: Colonial Revival
- NRHP reference No.: 94000336
- Added to NRHP: April 8, 1994

Gwyn Careg is a historic country estate at 68 Wolf Den Road in the Abington section of Pomfret, Connecticut. The main house on the property is a two-story brick structure built around 1760, altered in the late 19th century and again in the 1920s, giving it a Colonial Revival appearance. Eleanor Clark Murray developed the property as a country estate in the 1920s, including significant landscape design by William Jackson, a noted New York City landscape designer. The property has one of the most extensive collections of specimen trees in the state. It was added to the National Register of Historic Places in 1994.

== Description and history ==
Gwyn Careg is located in a rural setting of southern Pomfret, on the west side of Wolf Den Road a short way south of United States Route 44. The surviving 30 acres (12 ha) of a once larger estate include the main house, gatehouse, barn, and the remains of an early 20th-century greenhouse, as well as a designed landscape containing formal and informal elements. The main house is a frame building, built about 1760, which underwent extensive alterations in the 1890s and 1920s. Those alterations included refacing the exterior in brick veneer, which has been painted. This structure has been encrusted with additions, including an east-facing gabled section that is its principal facade to the street. It is set just north of the original main block, whose gable end houses the main entrance.

The gardens in which the house stand include a formal terraced area which descends from the house to a man-made lake, and a Spanish style walled garden just south of the house. The latter garden is surrounded by a stuccoed stone wall up to 11 feet (3.4 m) in height, and features a variety of perennial plantings. The terraced garden historically was adorned with statuary and urns containing plantings, but these features have been lost, as was the original boathouse on the lake. The property was surveyed in 1991 by the Connecticut Botanical Society, in which 27 specimen trees were identified; this is one of the largest collection of such trees in the state.

== See also ==
- National Register of Historic Places listings in Windham County, Connecticut
