= Overhills, North Carolina =

Unincorporated community in North Carolina, US

Coordinates: 35°13′16″N 79°01′54″W

Overhills is an unincorporated community located in the Johnsonville Township of Harnett County, North Carolina, United States, near the Cumberland County town of Spring Lake. It is a part of the Dunn Micropolitan Area, which is also a part of the greater Raleigh–Durham–Cary Combined Statistical Area (CSA) as defined by the United States Census Bureau.

The community was originally a 17,500-acre (7,100 ha) estate owned by the Percy Rockefeller family but later acquired by the federal government and is now mostly located inside nearby Fort Bragg (Powell 1968, p. 87). A Donald Ross-designed golf course was added to the estate in two separate projects and is also now located inside Fort Bragg.
