= Pomfret School =

Prep school in Pomfret, Connecticut, US

Location
- 398 Pomfret Street; Pomfret, Connecticut 06258; United States; 41°53′10″N 71°57′54″W

Information
- Type: Private, Coeducational, Secondary, Boarding
- Motto: Certa Viriliter (Strive Valiantly)
- Established: 1894 (132 years ago)
- Founder: William E. Peck
- CEEB code: 070615
- Chairman: Daryle Bost
- Head of school: Heather Willis Daly
- Grades: 9–12, postgraduate
- Enrollment: 350
- Campus type: Rural
- Student Union/Association: Olmsted Student Union Pomfret Alumni Association
- Colors: Red and black
- Athletics: 42 interscholastic teams
- Mascot: Griffin
- Newspaper: Pontefract
- Website: www.pomfret.org

Pomfret School is an independent, coeducational, college preparatory boarding and day school in Pomfret, Connecticut, United States, serving 350 students in grades 9 through 12 and post-graduates. Founded in 1894, it is in the Pomfret Street Historic District. The average class size is 12, with a student–teacher ratio of 6:1. Over 80% of faculty hold master's degrees or doctorates. Typically, 40% of students receive financial aid, 20% are students of color, and 21% are international students.

== Historical background ==
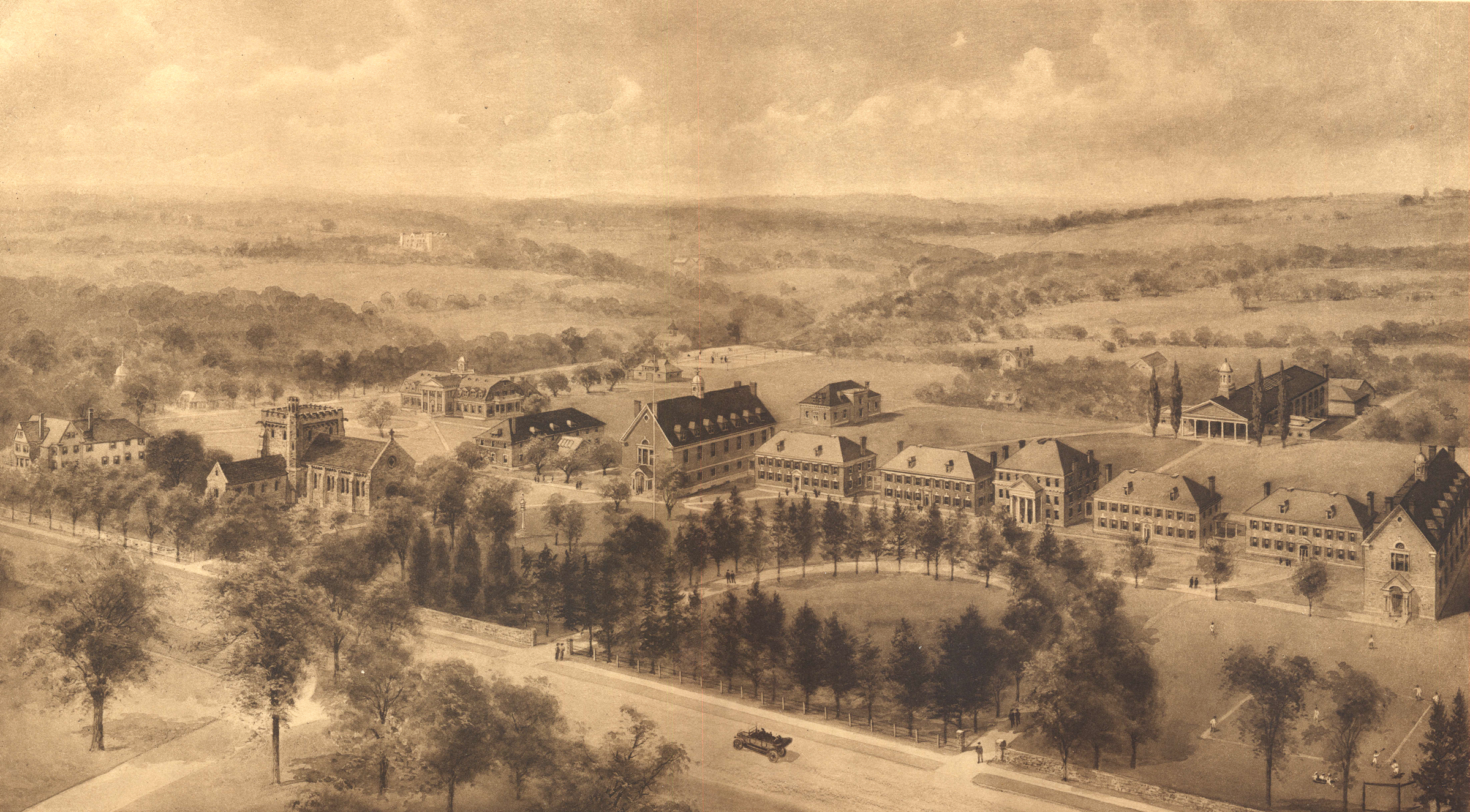
Architectural rendering and facilities plan of Pomfret School c. 1906

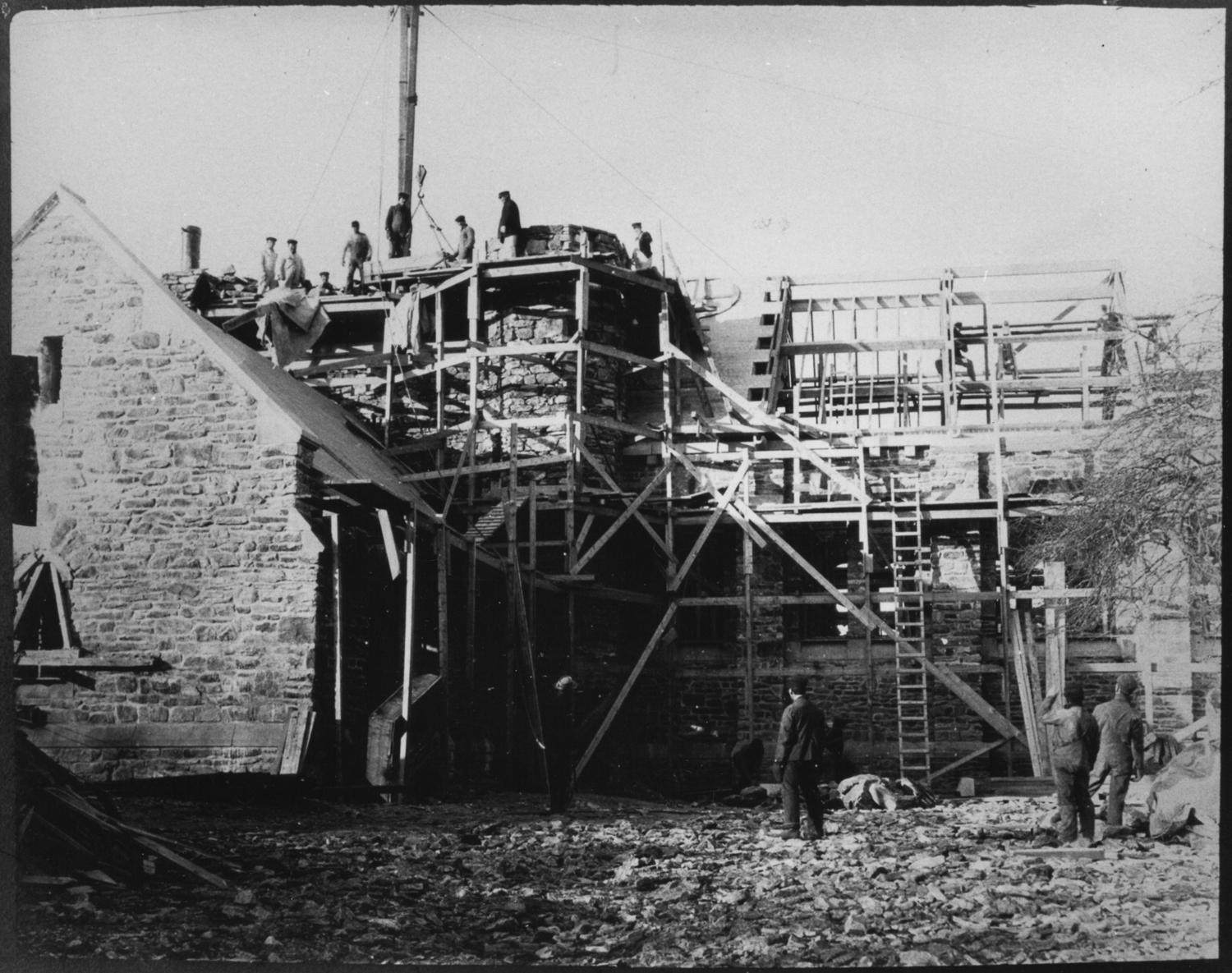
Construction of the George Newhall Clark '04 Memorial Chapel at Pomfret School c. 1908

The school opened October 3, 1894, founded by William E. Peck and his wife, Harriet. In the first decade of the 1900s, Pomfret was transformed from mainly Colonial Revival buildings to a "planned institution". By 1906, architect Ernest Flagg had designed a master plan for the school. The pavilion arrangement reflected the influence of Thomas Jefferson's design for the University of Virginia.

For the chapel, commissioned by Edward Clark in 1907, Flagg used Norman architecture as a model and emulated the rich textures of the unpolished stonework characteristic of that style.

After visiting the campus in 1910, when construction was nearly complete, Flagg compared Pomfret to his design of the U.S. Naval Academy at Annapolis, remarking, "The school is better architecturally than Annapolis." While his design for Annapolis had been repeatedly altered by the Navy during construction, the work at Pomfret scrupulously followed his design. Flagg hoped that his work for Pomfret would set a trend and lead to a "national style of architecture".

Harriet Peck Jones designed Pomfret's coat of arms. She contacted members of the Fermor family, holders of the earldom of Pomfret in England. They suggested the school's coat of arms should be that of their family: Argent, a fess sable (black) between three lions' heads erased gules (red).

Adam Hochschild, who attended Pomfret in the 1950s, described it in 1982 as one of about 20 select U.S. schools, all built around 1900 or before, that were "upper-class single-sex boarding schools" until the 1960s. He added that it was, at the time, "basically a school for the rich".

Since Hochschild's time, Pomfret has gradually attracted a significantly more diverse student body. In the 2023–24 school year, it awarded $5 million in financial aid to 37% of the student body.

== Campus ==
The 500-acre campus, established in 1894, was designed by landscape designer Frederick Law Olmsted, and expanded over the years to its current size through gifts and acquisitions. The facility's master plan was designed in 1906 by American architect Ernest Flagg.

== Notable buildings ==
A number of Pomfret's buildings and houses are listed in the National Register of Historic Places (NRHP).

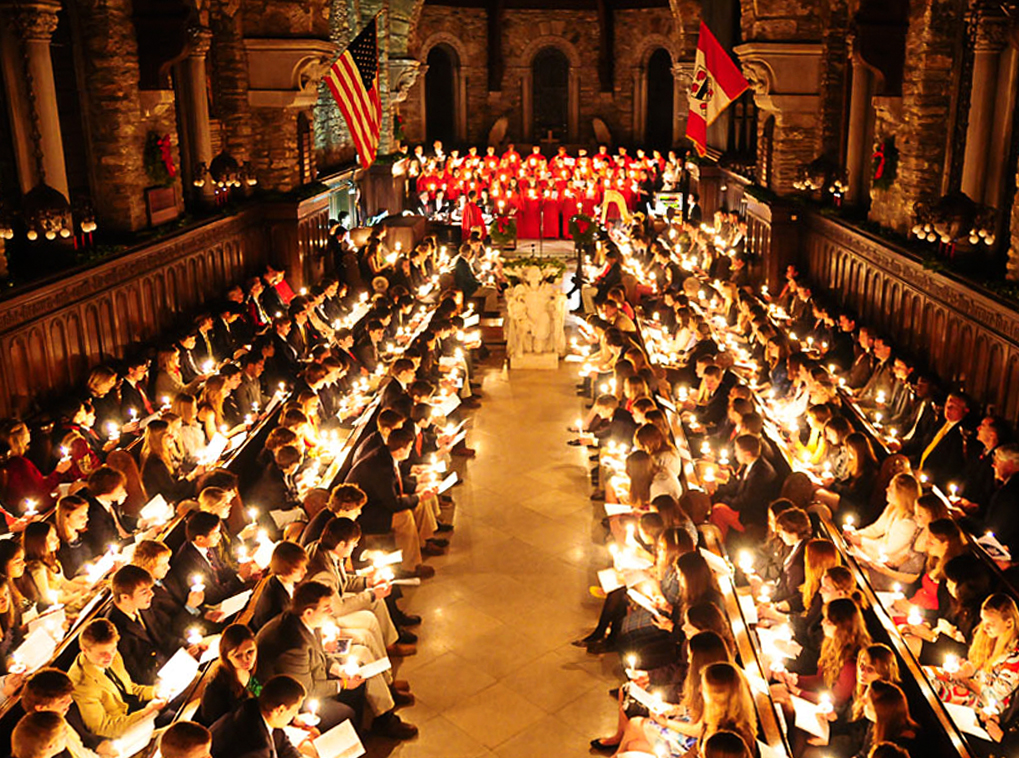
Holiday Carols in Clark Chapel

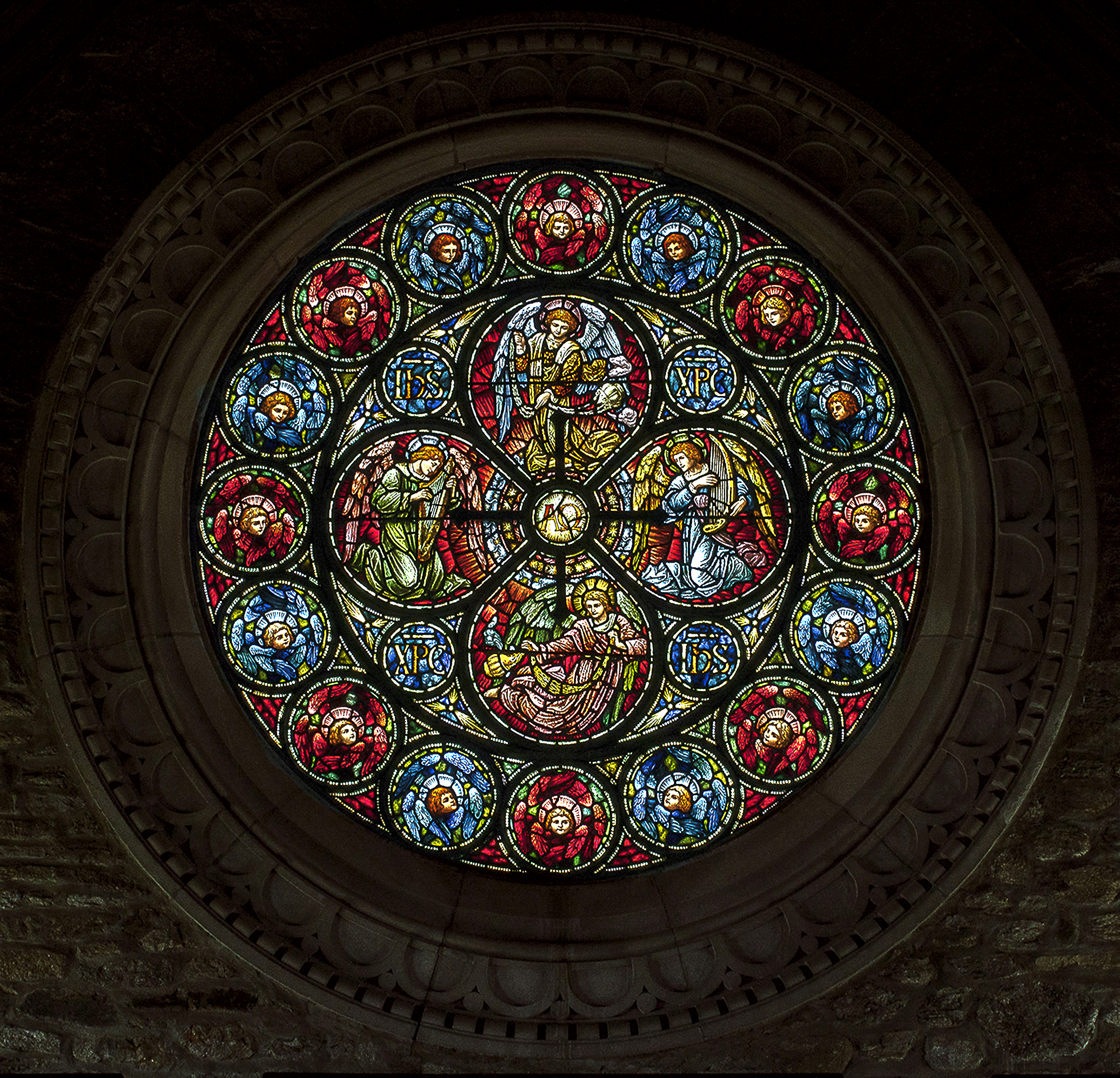
The 13th-century rose window from St. Julien Cathedral, France, Clark Memorial Chapel

=== Memorial Chapel ===
Dedicated on St. George's Day, 1908, and consecrated on May 16, 1909, the chapel was designed by Ernest Flagg and has three 13th-century French stained-glass windows.

The ten-foot-high rose window above the chapel doorway and two of the arched-top, oblong windows along the walls are apparently from the 13th-century cathedral Saint Julien of Tours, on the Loire river. The windows were donated to Pomfret in 1947. They are recorded as having been imported to the U.S. in 1904; they were auctioned in New York to an anonymous bidder and installed in Clark Chapel in 1949.

=== du Pont Library ===
It was designed by Cambridge Seven Associates, finished in 1969, and won many awards.

=== Jahn Ice Hockey Rink ===
In 2005, Brown Rink underwent a major renovation and was renamed Jahn Rink after Helmut Jahn, the architect who helped design it. Jahn's son attended Pomfret.

=== VISTA ===
Opened in 2024, the 22,000-square-foot Venue for Innovation, Science, Technology, and Academics features new classrooms and learning commons, state-of-the-art lab spaces, and a central gathering point called the Hub. The building was designed by Annum Architects of Boston and constructed by Shawmut Design and Construction.

=== Parsons Lodge ===
It won the 2010 AIA Connecticut People's Choice Award for “the building in which people would most like to study” and the 2009 Best Fireplace Award from Masonry Construction magazine.

== Athletics ==
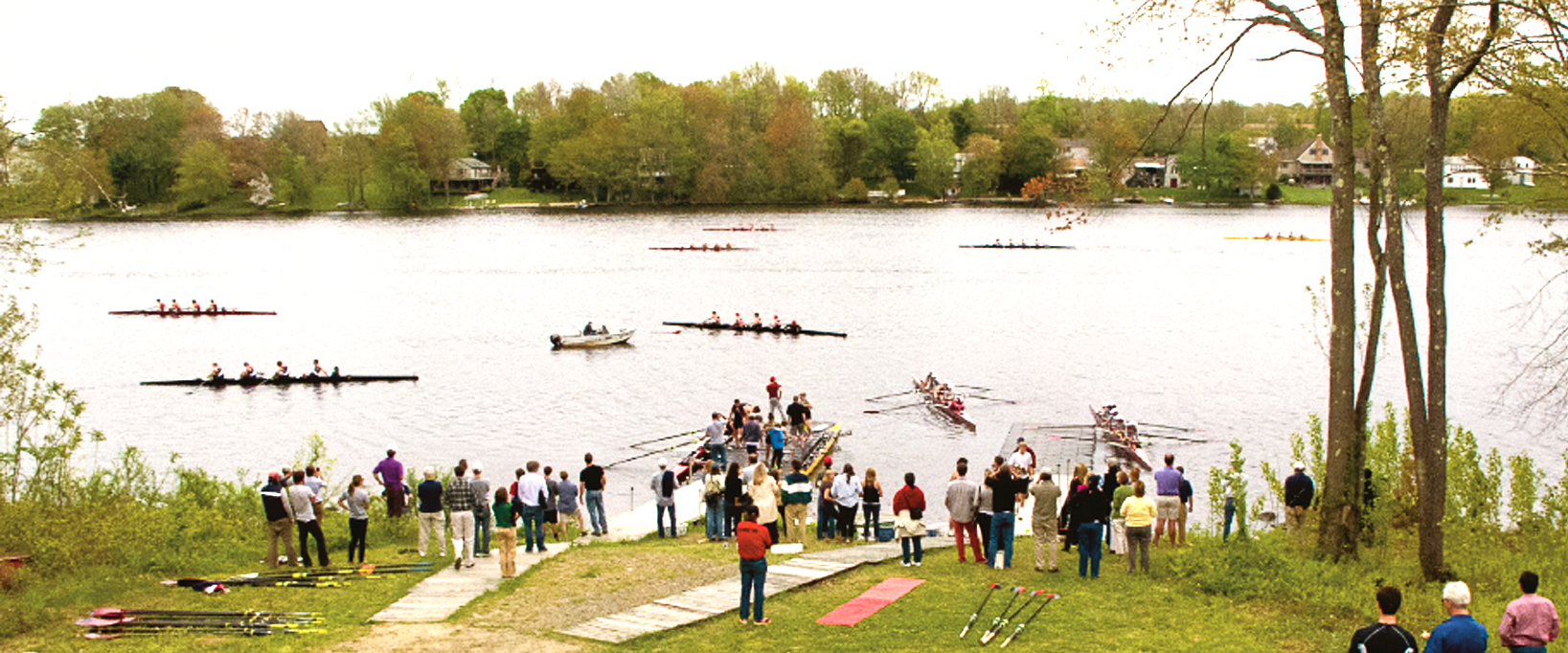
Pomfret Crew Regatta 2011

A member of the New England Preparatory School Athletic Council (NEPSAC), Pomfret fields 42 teams in 15 different sports and has won numerous championships during its history in both men's and women's sports. Girls Varsity Volleyball won the 2015 NESPAC Class B Championship. Boys Varsity Hockey won the 2017 NEPSAC Small School Championship. Most recently, Girls Varsity Soccer won the 2024 NEPSAC Class C Championship and Varsity Ultimate Frisbee won the 2025 NEPSUL D2 Championship after a 14–0 undefeated season.

== Arts ==
Pomfret's arts programs offer training and participation in visual and performing arts. There are performance facilities and art studios on campus, as well as a photography laboratory.

The Pomfret Grifftones and Chorus give concerts in the United States and overseas; in 2015 they performed in Florence, Lucca, at St. Stephen's School in Rome, and at the University of Connecticut.

== Crisis in the 1960s and 1970s ==
Pomfret went through a crisis in the 1960s and 70s, making "desperate fundraising appeals" necessary. Pomfret alumnus Adam Hochschild has said that since "Pomfret had never been quite in the top rank of New England boarding schools", the economic crisis was even direr for it. One year, the entering class did not reach the expected number of students. Teachers were compelled to take a 10% pay cut. Some started planning for the school's closing. In a men's restroom on campus, someone scrawled on the wall over a toilet paper dispenser: "Pomfret diplomas. Take one."

== Sexual misconduct allegations ==
In 2016, an independent investigation found that four teachers had "likely engaged in sexual misconduct" between the 1970s and 2000s. A letter the school sent the community said that the investigation "found four teachers 'more likely than not' engaged in sexual misconduct" and that there were "nine other 'credible reports' that teachers engaged in inappropriate behavior", but concluded there was "insufficient information". A Connecticut State Police investigation into the allegations was closed with no criminal charges filed.

== Notable alumni ==
- Philip Ainsworth Means, anthropologist and author
- Herbert Claiborne Pell Jr. 1902, member of Congress and U.S. ambassador to Hungary and Portugal
- Arthur Purdy Stout 1903, surgeon and pathologist
- Edward Streeter 1910, author and banker
- Frederic W. Lincoln IV 1917, Board of Trustees of the New York Medical College
- Edward Stettinius Jr. 1920, U.S. Secretary of State
- William F. Draper 1931, painter
- Thibaut de Saint Phalle 1935, banker
- Roger Angell 1938, writer and New Yorker editor
- Robert Vickrey 1944, writer and painter
- Robert B. Fiske 1948, United States Attorney and Whitewater Special Prosecutor
- William P. Carey 1948, philanthropist and businessman
- Jon Stone 1948, producer of Sesame Street and author
- Theodore R. Sizer 1949, educator
- Peter Beard 1956, photographer and author
- Orville Hickock Schell III 1958, journalist
- Adam Hochschild 1960, editor and author
- Joe Boyd 1960, record producer and author
- Jack Hardy 1965, singer-songwriter
- James Rothman 1967, biochemist and Nobel Prize winner
- Eric D. Coleman 1969, politician
- Robert F. Kennedy, Jr. - United States Secretary of Health and Human Services, Environmental law attorney (expelled 1970)
- Alex Gibney 1971, film director, writer, and producer
- Ridley Pearson 1971, author
- Lorenzo Borghese 1991, actor
- Spencer Bailey 2004, writer and editor
- Sarah Vaillancourt 2004, ice hockey player and Olympic gold medal winner
- Brian Flynn 2007, hockey player
- Felice Mueller, 2008, rower
- Chelsea Cutler 2015, singer, songwriter, and producer

== Notable faculty ==
- Horace Seely-Brown Jr., science teacher, congressman
