= Bernard Ryan Jr. =

American writer (1923–2020)

Bernard Ryan Jr. (December 2, 1923 – January 3, 2020) was an American writer. His works include The Poodle at the Poodle and Tyler's Titanic. His biography of Senator Hillary Clinton was a New York Times notable book for young adults in 2004. Ryan was a regular contributor to Advertising Age, Air & Space Smithsonian, American Way, Atlantic Flyer, Boys' Life, Country Home, Notre Dame Magazine, Parents, Private Pilot, and Your Money.

== Early life ==
A native of Albion, New York, Ryan graduated from the Rectory School in 1938, Kent School in 1942, and from Princeton University in February 1945 as a member of the Class of 1946. After college, he was a professional actor, TV/radio announcer, and director at WCTC.

== Books ==
- Six to Five Against: A Miscellany
- A Boy at The Four Corners: Looking into Small-town America in Its Prime
- The Poodle at The Poodle
- Law Enforcement Agencies: The Secret Service (2010)
- Tyler's Titanic
- The Wright Brothers: Inventors of the Airplane (YA)
- The Poisoned Life of Mrs. Maybrick
- Hillary Rodham Clinton: First Lady and Senator (YA)
- Jeff Bezos: Business Executive and Founder of Amazon.com (YA)
- Stephen Hawking: Physicist & Cosmologist (YA)
- Warren Buffett: Capitalist (YA)
- Jimmy Carter: U.S. President (YA)
- Condoleezza Rice: Secretary of State (YA)
- Simple Ways to Help Your Kids Become Dollar-Smart
- Helping Your Child Start School
- Teenage Volunteering
- Community Service for Teens (8 volumes)
- Great American Trials
- Great World Trials
- Sex, Sin and Mayhem: Notorious Trials of the Nineties
