= Bernie Ryan =

Australian rules footballer (1934–2017)

Personal information
- Full name: Bernie Ryan
- Born: 10 August 1934 (age 92)
- Died: 12 August 2017
- Original team: Yarrawonga
- Height: 183 cm (6 ft 0 in)
- Weight: 73 kg (161 lb)

Playing career^{1}
Years	Club	Games (Goals)
1956–1957	Geelong	9 (4)
- ^{1} Playing statistics correct to the end of 1957.

Bernie Ryan (10 August 1934 – 12 August 2017) was an Australian rules footballer who played for the Geelong Football Club in the Victorian Football League (VFL).
