= Israel Putnam Wolf Den =

- U.S. National Register of Historic Places
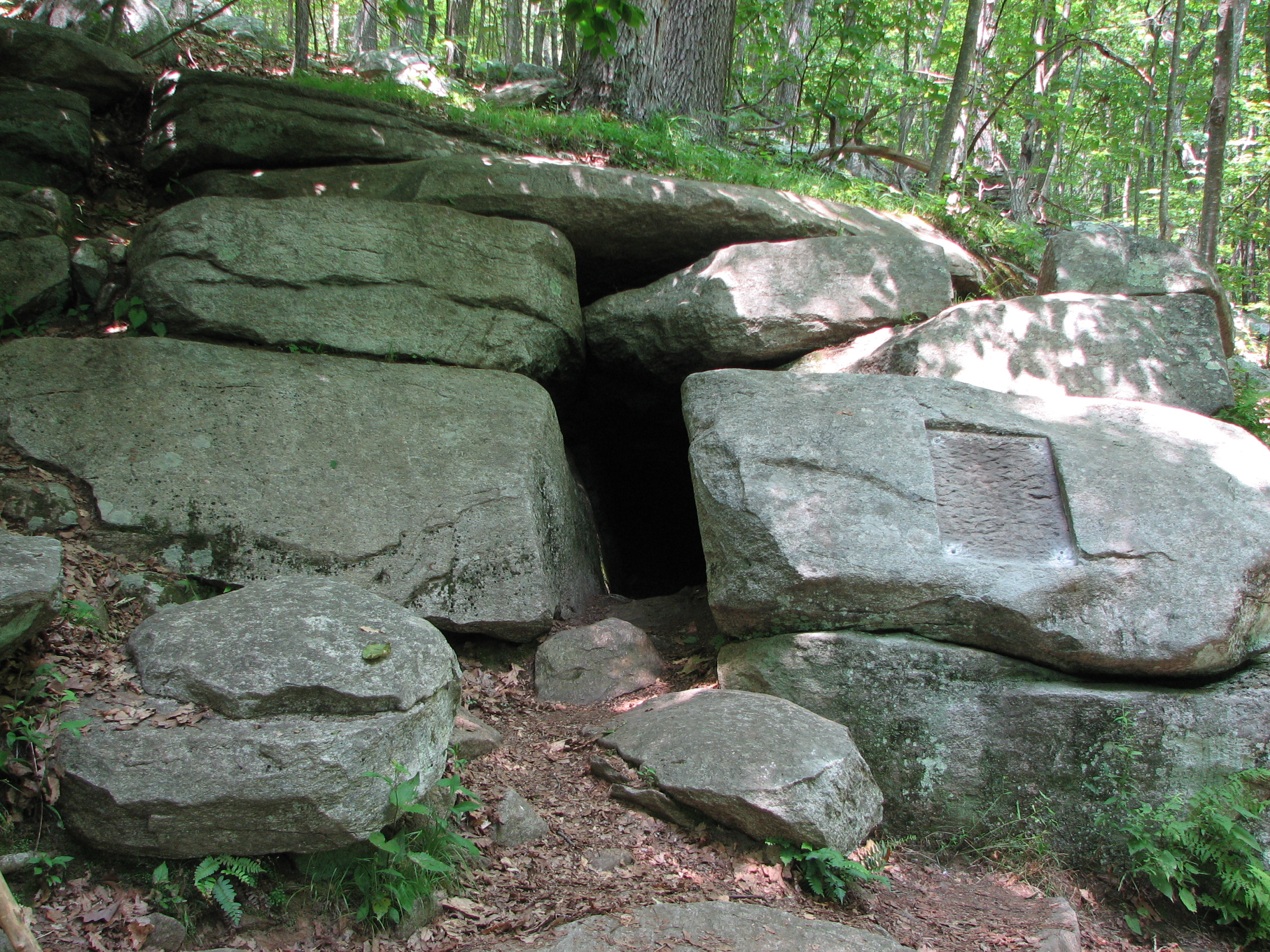
- July 2014

- Location within Connecticut Location within the United States
- Location: Pomfret, Connecticut
- Coordinates: 41°50′36″N 71°59′4″W
- NRHP reference No.: 85000949
- Added to NRHP: May 2, 1985

Israel Putnam Wolf Den is a historic site off Wolf Den Road in Pomfret, Connecticut. At this location in 1742, Israel Putnam shot and killed Connecticut's last known wolf. The site was added to the National Register of Historic Places in 1985.

== Legend ==
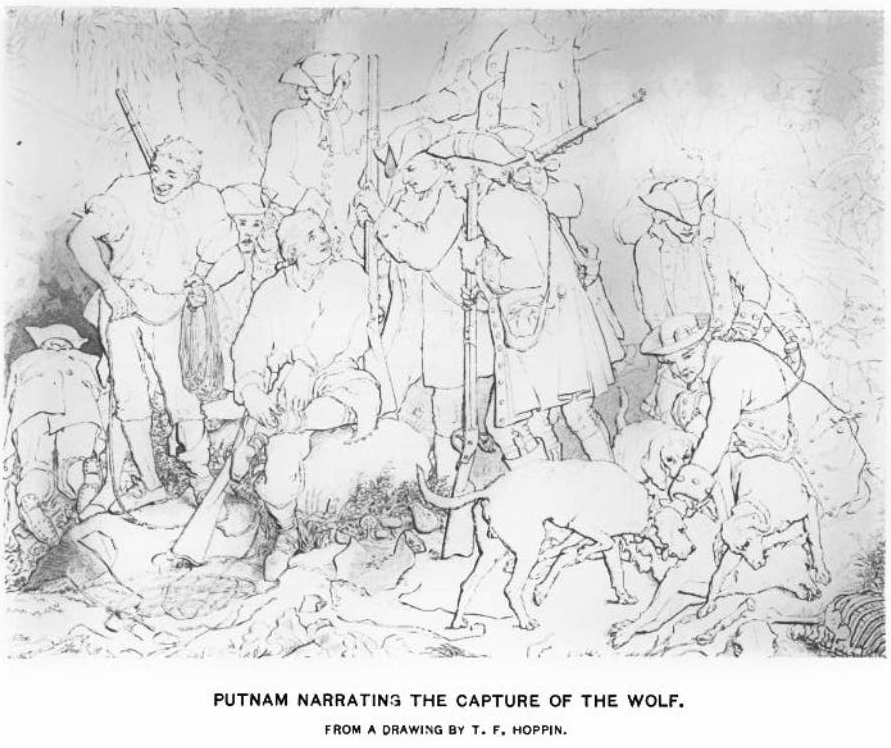
Israel Putnam narrating the capture of the wolf

A version of the legend, documented in a 1788 biography by David Humphreys, holds that Putnam and others tracked a wolf to the cave after it had killed seventy sheep on Putnam's farm. Putnam entered the cave by torch light, shot the wolf, and was pulled from the cave by a rope tied to his ankles, dragging the wolf behind him. The story has possibly been embellished over the years, but the main themes of the story, the cave and wolf, are believed to be factual by most Putnam biographers. The exploit was part of the early career of Putnam, who went on to become an officer in the French and Indian War, a leading Connecticut figure in the American Revolutionary War and a folk hero for many generations.

== Cave ==
The cave, a natural fissure in an outcropping of grey gneiss ledge, runs for about 20 feet back into the rock. At one time it may have opened into a small chamber, but leaves, debris, and fill have erased any evidence of this. The cave looks much as it did in the late 18th century when the tale of Putnam and the wolf was codified.

Today, the Wolf Den is accessible from a hiking trail off of Wolf Den drive in Mashamoquet Brook State Park, a +1,000-acre (400 ha) Connecticut state park, with two campgrounds, hiking, fishing, swimming, and picnicking.

== See also ==
- National Register of Historic Places listings in Windham County, Connecticut
