= Pomfret, Connecticut =

- Town
- Town of Pomfret
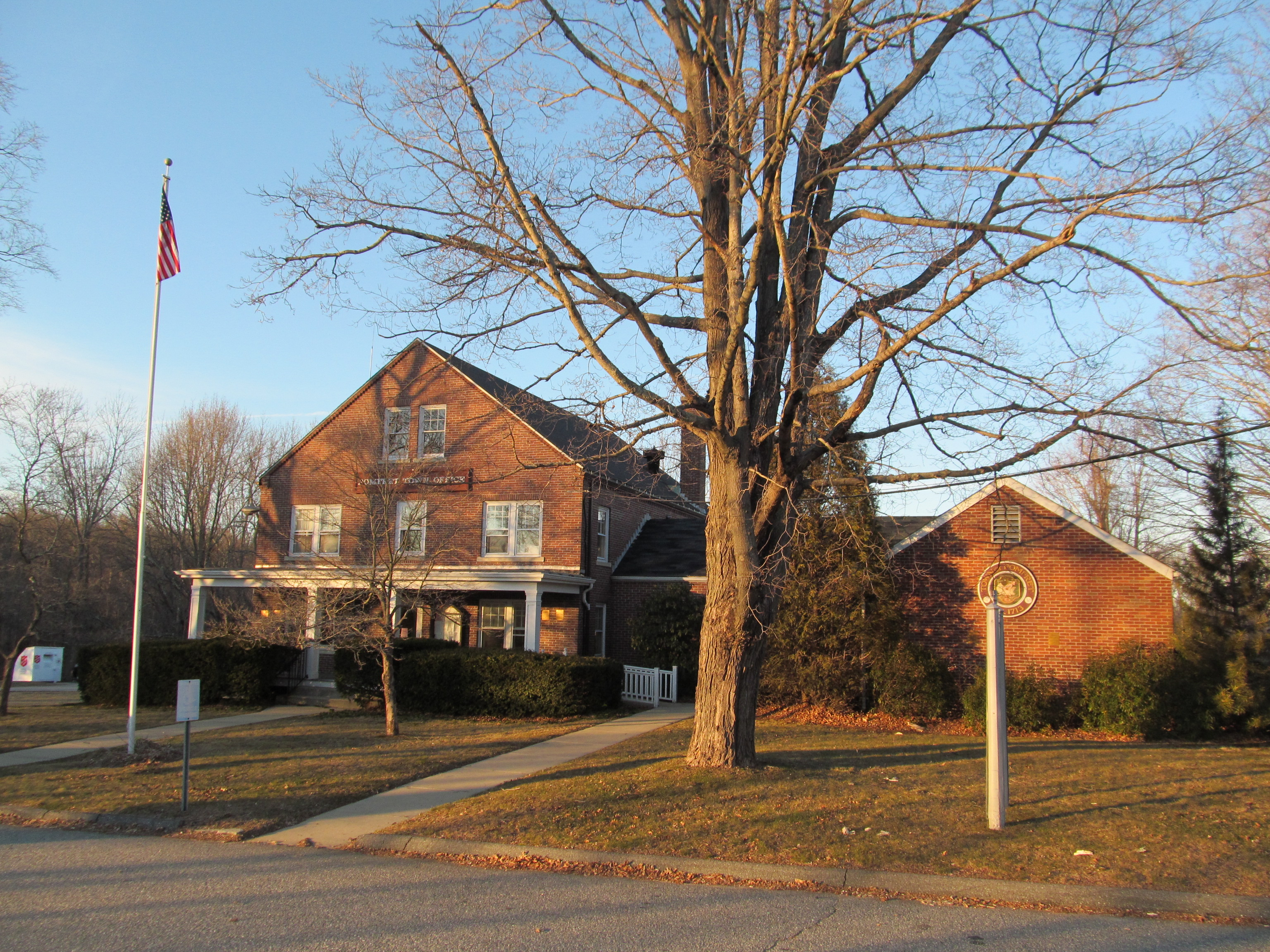
- Pomfret Town Office

- Seal
- Motto: Picturesque Pomfret
- Coordinates: 41°52′N 71°59′W
- Country: United States
- U.S. state: Connecticut
- County: Windham
- Region: Northeastern CT
- Incorporated: 1713

Government
  - Type: Selectman-Town Meeting
  - First selectman: Maureen A. Nicholson (D)
  - State Senator: Mae Flexer (D-29th District)
  - State Rep.: Patrick Boyd (D-50th District)

Area
  - Total: 40.6 sq mi (105.2 km^{2})
  - Land: 40.3 sq mi (104.4 km^{2})
  - Water: 0.27 sq mi (0.7 km^{2})
- Elevation: 430 ft (131 m)

Population (2020)
  - Total: 4,266
  - Density: 106/sq mi (40.9/km^{2})
- Time zone: UTC−5 (Eastern)
  - Summer (DST): UTC−4 (Eastern)
- ZIP code: 06259, 06258
- Area codes: 860/959
- FIPS code: 09-61030
- GNIS feature ID: 0213490
- Major highways: link = U.S. Route 44
- Website: https://www.pomfretct.gov/

Pomfret is a town in Windham County, Connecticut, with a population of 4,266 according to the 2020 United States Census. The town is part of the Northeastern Connecticut Planning Region. It was incorporated in 1713 and was named after Pontefract in West Yorkshire, England. The land was purchased from local Indians in 1686 in a deal known as the "Mashmuket Purchase" or "Mashamoquet Purchase".

== Geography ==
According to the United States Census Bureau, the town has a total area of 40.6 square miles (105 km^{2}), of which 40.3 square miles (104 km^{2}) is land and 0.3 square miles (0.78 km^{2}) (0.64%) is water. Pomfret is bordered on the north by Woodstock, on the east by Putnam and Killingly, on the west by Eastford, and on the south by Brooklyn and Hampton.

=== Villages ===
Pomfret includes several villages, neighborhoods, or sections:

- Abington
- Elliotts
- Pomfret
- Pomfret Center
- Pomfret Landing

=== Other geographic features ===
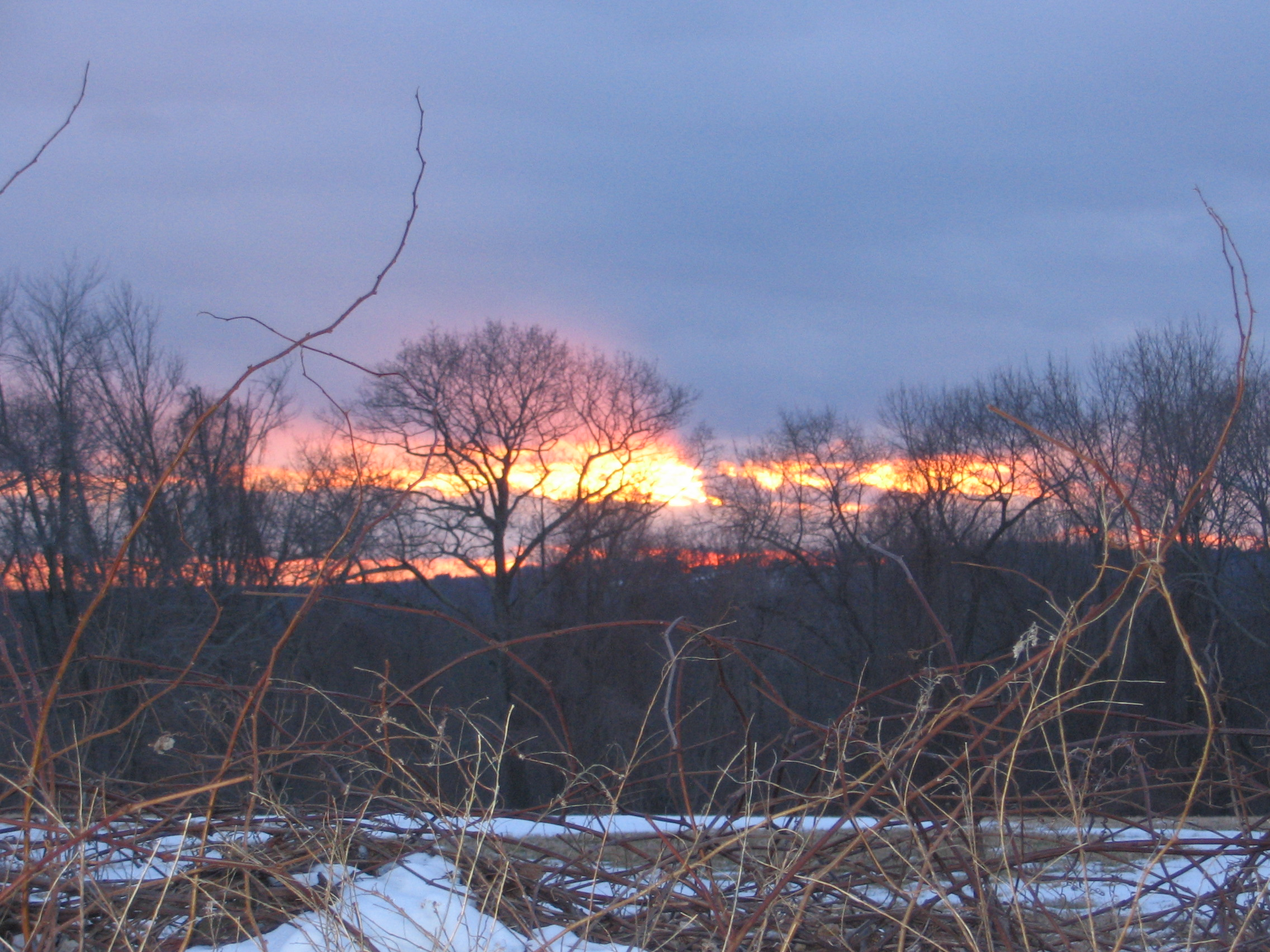
Angel Road

The principal roads through the town are U.S. Route 44 (running east–west) and Routes 169 (running north–south), and 101 (running east–west).

Mashamoquet State Park and Wolf Den State Park are both located in Pomfret near the intersection of US 44 and CT 101. Wolf Den State Park is the site of General Israel Putnam's slaying of the last wolf in Connecticut. Rocky paths connect the small cave, which is the actual wolf den, with a nearby boulder called the Indian Chair. Camping and cook-out facilities are available for a nominal fee.

The Air Line Trail is a former railroad bed which joins the town of Pomfret with the town of Putnam to the east. The trail runs seven miles (11 km), much of it through an Audubon Society property named the Bafflin Sanctuary, a 700-acre (2.8 km^{2}) nature preserve.

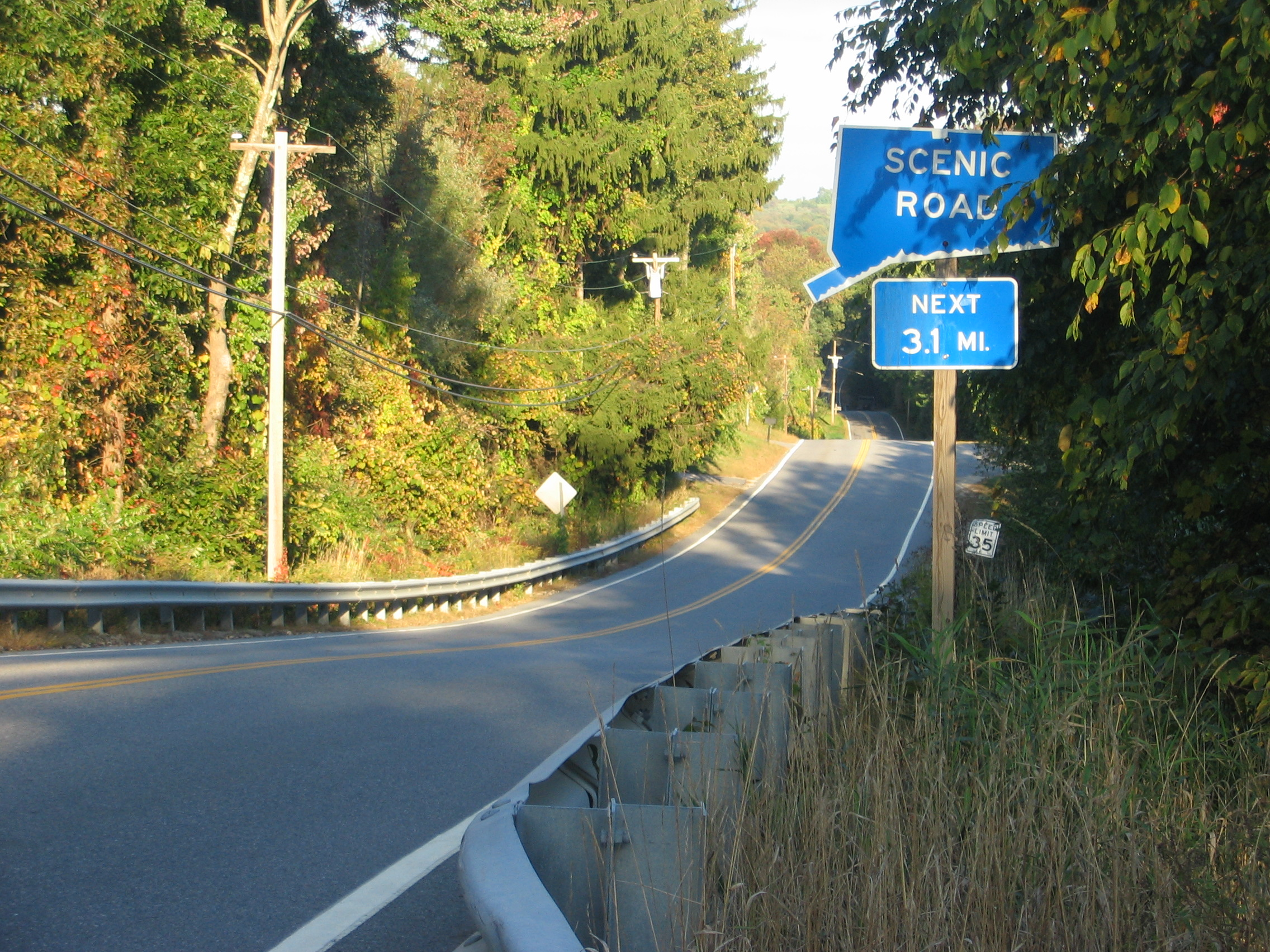
Brayman Hollow

Pomfret has no formal town center due to the town's significant southward expansion after its establishment. The town office is located on US Route 44. The Congregational church stood on the eastern edge of the old town green on Pomfret Hill until its destruction by fire on December 7, 2013. Approximately one mile north of the Congregational Church site is Christ Episcopal Church, which contains several windows designed and constructed by Louis Comfort Tiffany. The Rectory School is across from Christ Church on the west side of Route 44, founded in 1920. At the divergence point of US 44 and CT 169 is Most Holy Trinity Roman Catholic Church.

Pomfret also lies in a region known as the Last Green Valley, a Federally designated National Heritage Corridor. Covering in excess of 700,000 acres, more than 80 percent of which remains forested or agricultural. It stands as one of the largest undeveloped rural landscapes of the Northeast Corridor.

== Demographics ==
Historical population
Census	Pop.	Note	%±
1820	2,042		—
1850	1,805		—
1860	1,673		−7.3%
1870	1,488		−11.1%
1880	1,470		−1.2%
1890	1,471		0.1%
1900	1,831		24.5%
1910	1,857		1.4%
1920	1,454		−21.7%
1930	1,617		11.2%
1940	1,710		5.8%
1950	2,018		18.0%
1960	2,136		5.8%
1970	2,529		18.4%
1980	2,775		9.7%
1990	3,102		11.8%
2000	3,798		22.4%
2010	4,247		11.8%
2020	4,266		0.4%
U.S. Decennial Census

As of the census of 2010, there were 4,247 people, 1,582 households, and 1,123 families residing in the town. The population density was 105.4 inhabitants per square mile (40.7/km^{2}). There were 1,684 housing units at an average density of 41.8 per square mile (16.1/km^{2}). The racial makeup of the town was 95.7% White, 0.6% African American, 0.1% Native American, 1.6% Asian, 0.3% from other races, and 1.6% from two or more races. Hispanic or Latino of any race were 1.9% of the population.

Of the 1,582 households: 31.5% had children under the age of 18 living with them, 60.3% were married couples living together, 7.5% had a female householder with no husband present, and 29.0% were non-families. 22.8% of all households were made up of individuals, and 6.9% had someone living alone who was 65 years of age or older. The average household size was 2.57 and the average family size was 3.05.

In the town, the population was spread out, with 24.8% under the age of 18, 6.9% from 18 to 24, 23.4% from 25 to 44, 32.6% from 45 to 64, and 12.3% who were 65 years of age or older. The median age was 42 years. For every 100 females, there were 97.4 males. For every 100 females age 18 and over, there were 96.6 males.

The median income for a household in the town was $82,661, and the median income for a family was $96,641. Males had a median income of $54,042 versus $45,526 for females. The per capita income for the town was $39,712. About 3.8% of families and 6.3% of the population were below the poverty line, including 6.5% of those under age 18 and 6.4% of those age 65 or over.

== Education ==
Pomfret residents are zoned to the Pomfret Community School for grades Kindergarten through 8. Pomfret students are eligible to attend Woodstock Academy, which became Pomfret's zoned high school in 1987

Two private schools, the Pomfret School and the Rectory School, are also located in Pomfret. The Pomfret School, a college preparatory school across from the Congregational Church was founded in 1894 and was designed by noted architect, Ernest Flagg who is also credited with designing the US Naval Academy in Annapolis, Maryland and Singer Building in New York City.

== Historic sites ==
A 380-acre (1.5 km^{2}) portion of the town along Pomfret Street was listed as a historic district on the U.S. National Register of Historic Places in 1998. The Pomfret Street Historic District is composed of properties along Route 169 from Bradley Road to Woodstock Road.

Other properties listed on the National Register are:

- Brayton Grist Mill – US 44 (added 1986)
- Gwyn Careg US 44 (added 1994)
- Israel Putnam Wolf Den – Off Wolf Den Road (added 1985)
- Pomfret Town House – Town House Road (added 1989)
- Abington Congregational Church

== Notable people ==
- Rivers Cuomo (born 1970); while not born there, he lived in the town from age five.
- Roswell Eaton Goodell (1825–1903), politician and businessman
- Bertram Goodhue (1869–1924), an architect renowned for his work in the neo-Gothic style and the designer of notable typefaces, was born in town. He is best recognized for designing the Nebraska State Capital, St Thomas Episcopal Church in New York City, and the masterplan for the California of Institute Technology. While he is buried in a tomb in the Church of the Intercession in Manhattan, New York City, a memorial marker does exist for him in the Pomfret Street Cemetery.
- James Abbott McNeill Whistler (1834–1903). Whistler, the noted American painter, spent three of his childhood years in Pomfret between 1849 and 1851.
