= Percy Avery Rockefeller =

American corporate director

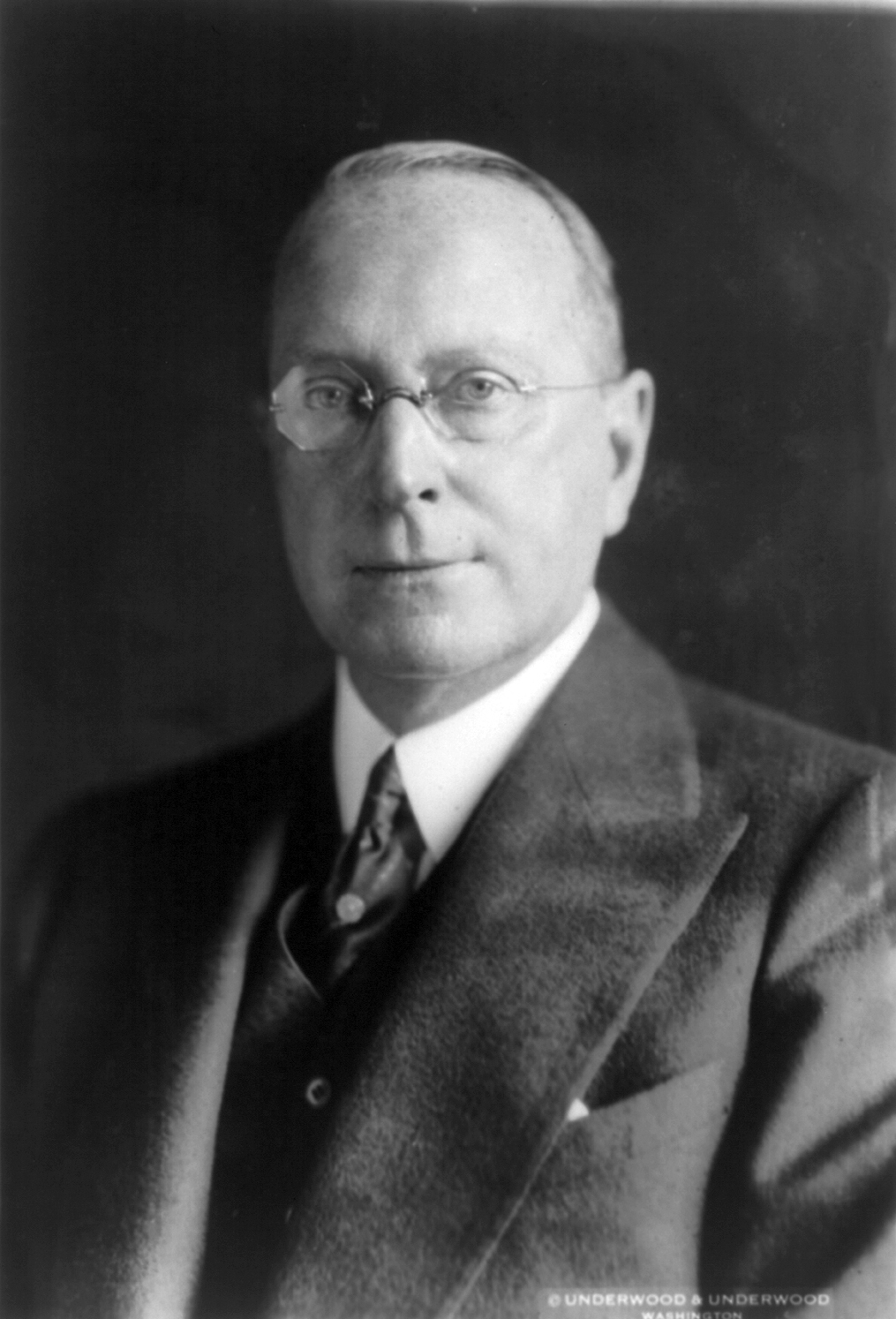
- Percy Rockefeller in 1932
- Born: February 27, 1878
- Died: September 25, 1934 (aged 56)
- Education: Yale University (1900)
- Spouse: Isabel Goodrich Stillman (m. 1901)
- Children: Isabel Stillman Rockefeller; Avery Rockefeller; Winifred Rockefeller; Faith Rockefeller; Gladys Rockefeller
- Parent(s): William Avery Rockefeller Jr. Almira Geraldine Goodsell
- Relatives: Rockefeller family

Percy Avery Rockefeller (February 27, 1878 — September 25, 1934) was a board director who founded and was vice president of Owenoke Corporation. He was a son of American Businessman William Avery Rockefeller Jr. and a nephew of Standard Oil co-founder John D. Rockefeller.

== Early life ==
Percy was the youngest son of William Avery Rockefeller Jr. and Almira Geraldine Goodsell. His father was a Standard Oil co-founder along with his uncle John D. Rockefeller. He attended Yale University from 1897 to 1900, where he was a member of Skull and Bones. Rockefeller was manager of the 1899 Yale Bulldogs football team and earned a varsity letter for his efforts.

== Board memberships ==
He was a board director of Air Reduction Company, American International Corporation, Atlantic Fruit Company, Anaconda Copper Mining Company, Bethlehem Steel Corporation, Bowman Biltmore Hotels Company, Cuba Company, Chile Copper Company, Consolidated Gas Company, Greenwich Trust Company, W. A. Harriman & Co. & Brown Brothers Harriman & Company, Mesabi Iron Company, National City Bank of New York, National City Company, New York Edison Company, North American Reassurance Company, National Surety Company, Provident Loan Society, Remington Arms, United Electric Light & Power Company, Western Union, and a number of other companies–one of the most prolific board directors in American history.

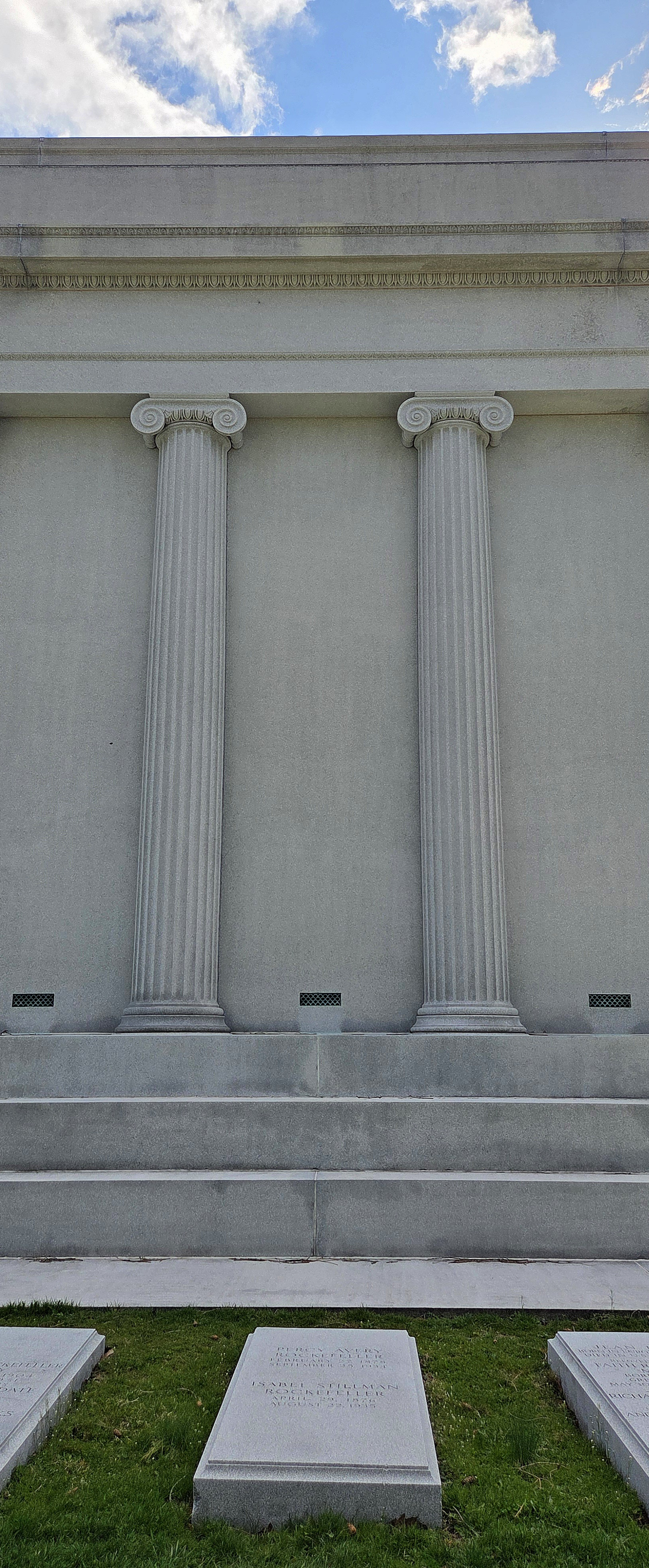
Grave of Percy Avery Rockefeller at the foot of his father's mausoleum

== Personal life ==
On April 23, 1901, Percy married Isabel Goodrich Stillman (died 1935). She was the younger daughter of First National City Bank president James Jewett Stillman (now known as Citibank) and Sarah Elizabeth Rumrill. Together, they had:

1. Isabel Stillman Rockefeller (1902–1980). She was a bride's maid at the wedding of Prescott Sheldon Bush (1895—1972) and Dorothy Wear Walker (1901–1992).
2. Avery Rockefeller (1903–1986)
3. Winifred Rockefeller (1904–1951)
4. Faith Rockefeller (1909–1960)
5. Gladys Rockefeller (1910–1988)

He died on September 25, 1934, and is interred at the foot of the William Rockefeller Mausoleum at Sleepy Hollow Cemetery in Sleepy Hollow, New York.
