= List of Norwich University alumni =

Following is a list of notable alumni of Norwich University, private senior military college in Northfield, Vermont. The university was called the American Literary, Scientific, and Military Academy from 1818 to 1834.

== Architecture ==
- William Rutherford Mead (non-degreed) – architect associated with the City Beautiful and Beaux Arts movements and partner in McKim, Mead, and White

== Business ==
- Bradley Birkenfeld 1988 – private banker and whistleblower about State Street Bank & Trust and the Swiss bank UBS
- Paul C. Cameron 1828 – co-builder of the North Carolina Railroad and justice on the North Carolina Supreme Court
- Orville Clark 182? – president of the Des Moines Navigation and Railroad Company and New York State Senate
- Grenville Dodge 1850 – chief engineer of the Union Pacific Railroad, Civil War general, U.S. congressman, and namesake of Dodge City, Kansas
- Junius Spencer Morgan (attended) – banker, financier, and the father of J. P. Morgan
- Robert Livingston Pell 1829 – farmer and landowner
- Harry Bates Thayer (attended 1875–1877) – president and chairman of the board of AT&T

== Education ==
- Patricia Aakhus – novelist and director of International Studies at the University of Southern Indiana
- Kenny Alexander 2019 (MA) – college system chancellor, and political science instructor at Tidewater Community College, Virginia Senate, Virginia House of Delegrates, and mayor of Norfolk, Virginia
- Alvan E. Bovay 1841 – co-founder of Ripon College and of the Republican Party
- Thomas Green Clemson 1824 – founder of Clemson University and US Ambassador to Belgium
- Thomas J. Cutler 1988 – author, director of the Walbrook Maritime Academy, and associate editor of the United States Naval Institute
- Tarak Nath Das – professor of political science at Columbia University
- Carlo D'Este 1958 – military historian, biographer, and lecturer at School of Advanced Military Studies, United States Army Command and General Staff College
- Roxane Gay – writer and professor at Eastern Illinois University, Purdue University, and Yale University
- Ernest N. Harmon (attended 1914) – president of Norwich University, major general, and commander of 1st Armored Division, 2nd Armored Division, and XXII Corps during World War II
- Robert F. McDermott (attended 1937–1939) – dean of faculty at the Air Force Academy, brigadier general; flew 61 combat missions during World War II in the European Theatre
- Tracey Poirier 1996 – assistant vice president for student affairs at Norwich University; brigadier general in the Vermont Army National Guard
- Andrea Talentino 2017 (MBA) – ninth president of Augustana College
- Marjorie Welish – poet and instructor at the Pratt Institute and Brown University

== Engineering and science ==
- Edward Dean Adams 1864 – founded and directed the Cataract Construction Company and developed the systems to produce electric power at Niagara Falls
- Richard E. Hayden 1968 – acoustics researcher and winner of the Wright Brothers Medal in 1973
- Frederick W. Lander 1852 – surveyor of railroad routes and wagon trails in the Western American States and brigadier general during the Civil War
- Samuel T. Wellman 1866 – steel industry pioneer and inventor
- Horatio Wright (attended 1834–1836) – engineer for the Brooklyn Bridge and the Washington Monument, chief of engineers for the Army; major general, commander with the Army of the Potomac during the American Civil War, commander of the Army of Texas

== Law ==
- Charles J. Adams 1939 – Vermont attorney general
- F. Elliott Barber Jr. 1934 – Vermont attorney general
- Luther Loren Baxter – Minnesota Senate, Minnesota House of Representatives, probate judge, United States attorney, and county attorney for Carver County, Minnesota
- Thomas Bragg 1828 – attorney general of the Confederate States, governor of North Carolina 1855–1859, and United States Senate
- Thaddeus M. Buczko – Massachusetts House of Representatives, Massachusetts auditor, and justice of the Essex County Probate and Family Court
- Paul C. Cameron 1828 – justice on the North Carolina Supreme Court and co-buiider of the North Carolina Railroad
- John P. Connarn 1941 – Vermont attorney general, 1965–1967; judge with the Vermont District Court 1967–1985, and member of Vermont House of Representatives
- S. Park Coon – attorney general of Wisconsin
- Jasper W. Gilbert 1832 – justice on the New York Supreme Court
- William Pitt Kellogg 1848 – chief justice of the Nebraska Territory Louisiana Senate, and governor of Louisiana
- Jefferson P. Kidder 1834 – justice of territorial Supreme Court, lieutenant governor of Vermont, and United States House of Representatives for the Dakota Territory
- William Little Lee 1842 – chief justice of the Hawaiian Kingdom and privy counselor to Kamehameha III
- Michael Mori 1991 – lawyer of Guantanamo Bay detainee David Matthew Hicks and recipient of the American Civil Liberties Union's Roger N. Baldwin Medal of Liberty Award
- Theodore Sedgwick 1826 – U.S. attorney for the Southern District of New York
- Burleigh F. Spalding 1877 – chief justice of the North Dakota Supreme Court and United States House of Representatives from North Dakota

== Literature and journalism ==
- Patricia Aakhus – novelist and director of International Studies at the University of Southern Indiana
- Sharifa Alkhateeb – journalist and editor
- Thomas J. Cutler 1988 – author, director of the Walbrook Maritime Academy, and associate editor of the United States Naval Institute
- William Richard Cutter – writer, historian, librarian, and genealogist
- Raffaël Enault – French writer and film director.
- Roxane Gay – writer and professor at Eastern Illinois University, Purdue University, and Yale University
- Marjorie Welish – poet and instructor at Pratt Institute and Brown University

== Military ==
- Fred Thaddeus Austin 1888 – major general and U.S. Army chief of field artillery
- Hiram Iddings Bearss (attended 1894–1895) – brigadier general who received the Medal of Honor during the Philippine–American War
- Francis William Billado 1933 – major general and adjutant general of the Vermont National Guard
- James Vote Bomford 1828 – brigadier general in the U.S. Army
- Irving L. Branch 1934 – United States Air Force general
- John J. Broadmeadow 1983 – lieutenant general in the United States Marine Corps
- Edward H. Brooks 1916 – lieutenant general, commander, VI Armored Corps during World War II; and commanding general, U.S. Army in the Caribbean
- James M. Burt 1939 – received the Medal of Honor for the Battle of Aachen during World War II
- Henry Stanton Burton (attended 1832–1835) – brevet brigadier general, U.S. Army
- Thomas A. Bussiere 1985 – general in the United States Air Force, commander, Air Force Global Strike Command
- Edward Byers 2016 – Navy SEAL and Medal of Honor recipient
- Harold D. Campbell 1917 – United States Marine Corps major general
- George Colvocoresses 1831 – commanded USS Saratoga during the Civil War
- George Partridge Colvocoresses 1866 – rear admiral in the U.S. Navy and commandant of cadets at the United States Naval Academy
- George A. Converse 1863 – rear admiral, notable naval engineer, and chief of the Bureaus of Equipment, Ordnance, and Navigation
- Norman Cooling (attended 1986) – brigadier general in the United States Marine Corps
- Kara Corcoran 2008 – Major in the U.S. Army
- Reginald M. Cram 1936 – adjutant general of the Vermont National Guard
- Thomas Tingey Craven 1824 – U.S. Navy admiral
- George Dewey (attended 1852–1854) – admiral of the Navy, commanded the Navy's Asiatic Squadron at the Battle of Manila Bay during the Spanish–American War
- Grenville M. Dodge 1851 – major general, commander of the Department of Missouri; and chief engineer of Union Pacific, and namesake of Dodge City, Kansas
- Donald E. Edwards 1959 – adjutant general of the Vermont National Guard
- Jesse Gove 1849 – colonel in the American Civil War
- Ernest N. Harmon (attended 1914) – major general, president of Norwich University, and commander of the 1st Armored Division, 2nd Armored Division, and XXII Corps during World War II
- Richard W. Higgins (attended, class of 1944) – USAF pilot decorated by German Air Force for saving civilians in an accident
- Willie Johnston (attended 1866–1868) – youngest recipient of the Medal of Honor
- Frederick W. Lander 1852 – brigadier general during the American Civil War and surveyor of railroad routes and wagon trails in the Far Wes
- Albert Martin – defender of the Alamo in 1836
- Robert F. McDermott (attended 1937–1939) – flew 61 combat missions during World War II in the European Theatre, dean of faculty to the Air Force Academy, and brigadier general
- Robert H. Milroy 1843 – brigadier general, in command or present at the Union reverses of the Battle of McDowell, Battle of Cross Keys, and Battle of Second Winchester
- Lewis Samuel Partridge 1838 – major general, adjutant general of the Vermont Militia
- Hiram Paulding 1822 – rear admiral, commander of the Navy's Home Squadron, and commandant of the New York Navy Yard
- Thomas Payne 2017 – member of U.S. Army Special Mission Unit who received the Medal of Honor for operations against ISIS in Iraq
- Samuel L. Pitkin 1823 – adjutant general for the State of Connecticut
- Tracey Poirier 1996 – brigadier general, first female general officer of the Vermont Army National Guard and assistant vice president for student affairs at Norwich University
- James Ezekiel Porter (attended 1863–1864) – officer in the 7th Cavalry 1869–1876; killed at the Battle of the Little Bighorn
- David E. Quantock 1980 – lieutenant general and inspector general of the United States Army
- Thomas E. G. Ransom (attended 1848–1850) – brigadier general in the Union Army during the American Civil War
- Edmund Rice 1859 – brigadier general and recipient of the Medal of Honor for actions at the Battle of Gettysburg
- William Huntington Russell 1828 – major general, commander of Connecticut state militia during the American Civil War; founder of the Skull and Bones society at Yale University
- Thomas O. Seaver 1859 – commanded the 3rd Vermont Infantry during the American Civil War; received the Medal of Honor
- Eric Slover – Army helicopter pilot awarded the Medal of Honor for his actions during the 2026 United States intervention in Venezuela
- Gordon R. Sullivan 1959 – general and Army chief of staff
- Frederick Townsend Ward (attended 1846–1848) – soldier of fortune famous for his military victories for Imperial China during the Taiping Rebellion
- James H. Ward 1823 – first commandant of the United States Naval Academy; first Union Naval officer killed in action during the American Civil War
- Gideon Welles 1826 – served as United States secretary of the Navy under Presidents Lincoln and Johnson
- Isaac D. White (Class of 1952) – armor officer who commanded U.S. Army, Pacific (USARPAC) July 1957–1961
- Seth Williams 1903 – quartermaster general of the Marine Corps and major general
- Edward Bancroft Williston 1856 – brigadier general, received the Medal of Honor
- Leonard F. Wing Sr. (attended 1910–1914) – brigadier general and commander of 43rd Infantry Division during World War II
- Henry Clay Wood 1856 – brigadier general, received the Medal of Honor
- Horatio Wright (attended 1834–1836) – engineer for Brooklyn Bridge and Washington Monument; U.S. Army chief of engineers; commander of Union Army's Army of Texas

== Politics ==
- Kenny Alexander 2019 (MA) – Virginia Senate, Virginia House of Delegrates, mayor of Norfolk, Virginia, college system chancellor, and political science instructor at Tidewater Community College
- David V. Anderson 1922 – Vermont auditor of accounts
- Luther Loren Baxter – Minnesota Senate, Minnesota House of Representatives, probate judge, United States attorney, and county attorney for Carver County, Minnesota
- Portus Baxter 1824 – United States House of Representatives
- Alvan E. Bovay 1841 – co-founder of Republican Party and of Ripon College
- Dennis Bradley – Connecticut State Senate
- Thomas Bragg 1828 – governor of North Carolina, United States Senate, and attorney general of the Confederate States
- Ansel Briggs 1820 – first governor of Iowa
- Francis K. Brooks 1967 – Vermont House of Representatives and Vermont Senate
- George E. Bryant 1854 – Wisconsin State Senate
- Thaddeus M. Buczko – Massachusetts House of Representatives, Massachusetts auditor, and justice of the Essex County Probate and Family Court
- Asa Clapp 1823 – member of United States House of Representatives
- Orville Clark 182x ? – member of New York State Senate and president of the Des Moines Navigation and Railroad Company
- Thomas Green Clemson 1824 – U.S. ambassador to Belgium and founder of Clemson University
- George W. Clinton 1827 – mayor of Buffalo
- Jay Collins – lieutenant governor of Florida
- John P. Connarn 1941 – member of Vermont House of Representatives; Vermont attorney general, and judge in Vermont District Court
- Charles A. Coolidge 1863 – United States Army brigadier general.
- Laurentino Cortizo – president of Panama, president of the National Assembly, and minister of Agricultural and Livestock Development
- John J. Daley 1949 – lieutenant governor of Vermont, member of Vermont House of Representatives, and mayor of Rutland
- Tarak Nath Das 1908 – co-founder of the Ghadar Party and Indian freedom fighter
- Moses M. Davis – Wisconsin Senate and Wisconsin State Assembly
- Dustin Allard Degree – Vermont General Assembly
- Brian Dempsey – Massachusetts House of Representatives
- Joseph H. Denny 1905 – Vermont House of Representatives and Vermont Senate
- Charles D. Drake 1825 – United States Senate
- Ryland Fletcher 1824 – governor of Vermont
- Colonel Ernest Willard Gibson 1894 – United States Senate
- Colonel Ernest W. Gibson Jr. 1923 – United States Senate and governor of Vermont
- Jason R. Holsman 2003 – Missouri Senate
- William Pitt Kellogg 1848 – Louisiana State Senate, governor of Louisiana, and chief justice of the Nebraska Territory
- Colin Kenny 1966 – Senate of Canada and adviser to Prime Minister Pierre Trudeau
- Jefferson P. Kidder 1834 – lieutenant governor of Vermont, United States House of Representatives for the Dakota Territory, and justice of territorial Supreme Court
- Robert M. Lawton 1952 – New Hampshire House of Representatives, and founder of Funspot
- William Little Lee 1842 – privy counselor to Kamehameha III and chief justice of Hawaiian Kingdom
- Caleb Lyon 1841 – governor of the Idaho Territory and United States House of Representatives
- Charles A. Plumley 1896 – United States House of Representatives
- Paul N. Poirier 1970 –Vermont House of Representatives
- Horatio Seymour 1828 – governor of New York and 1868 Democratic nominee for president of the United States
- Burleigh F. Spalding 1877 –United States House of Representatives and chief justice of the North Dakota Supreme Court
- Edward Stanly 1829 – United States House of Representatives
- Sugiono – minister of Foreign Affairs of the Republic of Indonesia
- Gideon Welles 1826 – United States secretary of the Navy

== Religion and nonprofits ==
- Gregory T. Bedell – Episcopal bishop of Ohio
- William Griffith Wilson 1917 – co-founder of Alcoholics Anonymous, in the top 20 of the "Time 100: Heroes and Icons" in the 20th century

== Sports ==
- Beau Almodobar – professional football player
- Ted Arcidi – powerlifting/bench press world record holder
- Tom Aubrun – professional ice hockey player
- Keith Aucoin 2001 – professional ice hockey player
- Don Brown 1977 – college football coach
- Mike Brown 2000 – Academic All-American wrestler; professional mixed martial artist, and WEC Featherweight Champion in 2008
- Amanda Conway 2020 – professional ice hockey player with the Connecticut Whale
- Jay Cottone (attended 1968–1970) – college football coach
- Dominick Dawes – college ice hockey coach and professional ice hockey player
- Long Ding – professional football player
- Allen Doyle 1971 – golfer on the Champions Tour, U.S. Senior Open Champion in 2005 and 2006, and Senior PGA Champion in 1999
- Pierre Garçon – professional football player
- Bill Kenney – college football coach
- Frank Liebel 1941 – professional football player with the New York Giants and Chicago Bears
- Jim Luscinski – professional football player
- Harold D. Martin – college football coach, Negro league baseball player
- Kurtis McLean 2005 – professional ice hockey player
- Bobby Murray – professional baseball player
- Arlie Pond 1888–1890 – major league pitcher for the Baltimore Orioles
- Frank Simonetti 1984 – professional ice hockey player with the Boston Bruins
- Brent Thompson (1997) – college football coach
