= Martin Flint =

American politician and military figure (1782–1855)

Martin Flint (January 12, 1782 – February 27, 1855) was a Vermont political and military figure who served in the Vermont House of Representatives and as Adjutant General of the Vermont Militia.

== Early life ==
Martin Flint was born in Hampton, Connecticut on January 12, 1782. He was three years old when is family moved to Vermont, and he completed only a limited education before the death of his father required him to take over operation of the family's Randolph farm.

== War of 1812 ==
Flint helped to raise and equip a militia company for the War of 1812. Lebbeus Egerton was the commander, and Flint was second in command with the rank of First Lieutenant. Flint served in the Defense of Plattsburgh during the British invasion.

== Later career ==
In 1816 Flint lost the sight in his right eye as the result of a prolonged illness, but after his recovery he resumed management of his farm.

He was originally active in Vermont's Masons, but in the 1830s he made a public renunciation of his Masonic membership and became a leader of the Anti-Masonic Party. From 1831 to 1835 he served as an Anti-Mason in the Vermont House of Representatives, and in 1836 he was a member of the Governor's Council.

In 1836 Flint was also an unsuccessful candidate for the United States House of Representatives, losing the 3rd District election to Horace Everett, the Whig and Alden Partridge running as a Democrat.

Flint maintained his membership in the militia, and advanced to the rank of Major. In 1833 he succeeded Isaac Fletcher as adjutant general. He was succeeded in 1837 by Frederic Williams Hopkins.

In 1839 Flint was elected Sheriff of Orange County, but declined the office.

From 1841 to 1844 he served as Orange County Assistant Judge.

== Death and burial ==
Flint continued to operate his farm into the 1850s. In his later years his health declined, and he sometimes suffered from dementia. He died in Randolph on February 27, 1855, and was buried in Randolph Center Cemetery.

== Family ==
Martin Flint was married twice. His first wife was Chloe Burnett (1774-1811). After her death he married Asenath Morse (1784-1874). Asenath Morse was a niece of Dudley Chase and Philander Chase, and a cousin of Salmon P. Chase.

Flint had seven children, three with Chloe and four with Asenath. They included:

Martin M. Flint (1816-1897), a Norwich University graduate who was an officer in the 40th and 60th Wisconsin Volunteer Infantry regiments during the American Civil War, and later farmed in California and Kansas; Martin Monroe Flint was married to Eliza Chase, a granddaughter of Philander Chase.

John Morse Flint (1822-1895), a teacher and school superintendent who later relocated to Wisconsin and served in the Wisconsin State Assembly.

== External resources ==
- Martin Flint at Find A Grave

Military offices
Preceded by Isaac Fletcher	Vermont Adjutant General; 1833-1837	Succeeded by Frederic Williams Hopkins
