= Heman Smith =

Heman Smith may refer to:

- Heman C. Smith (1850–1919), leader in and official historian of the Reorganized Church of Jesus Christ of Latter Day Saints
- Heman R. Smith (1795–1861), Vermont farmer and military officer
