= General Kellogg =

General Kellogg may refer to:

- Daniel Kellogg (judge) (1791–1875), Vermont Militia adjutant general
- George Bradley Kellogg (1826–1875), Vermont Militia adjutant general
- Keith Kellogg (born 1944), U.S. Army lieutenant general
