= Charles Chapin (U.S. Marshal) =

U.S. Marshal for Vermont

United States Marshal for the District of Vermont
- In office 1853–1857
- Preceded by: John Pettes
- Succeeded by: Lewis Samuel Partridge

Member of the Vermont House of Representatives from Brattleboro
- In office 1833–1834
- Preceded by: Lemuel Whitney
- Succeeded by: Lemuel Whitney

Personal details
- Born: July 10, 1803 Orange, Massachusetts, U.S.
- Died: January 6, 1878 (aged 74) Brattleboro, Vermont, U.S.
- Resting place: Prospect Hill Cemetery, Brattleboro, Vermont
- Party: Democratic
- Spouse(s): Elizabeth B. Bridge (m. 1827-1828, her death); Sophia Dwight Orne (m. 1830-1878, his death)
- Children: 6
- Education: Harvard College
- Occupation: Physician; Businessman; Government official

Charles Chapin (July 10, 1803 – January 6, 1878) was a medical doctor and public official from Brattleboro, Vermont. Among the offices in which he served were member of the Vermont House of Representatives (1833-1834) and United States Marshal for the District of Vermont (1853–1857).

== Biography ==
Charles Chapin was born in Orange, Massachusetts July 10, 1803, a son of Judge Oliver Chapin (1759-1811) and Mary (Jones) Chapin (1765-1849). At birth, Chapin's name was recorded as Charles Oliver Chapin, but he did not use a middle name, and his name sometimes appeared in contemporary newspaper articles as "Chas. Chapin". Oliver Chapin's family moved to Brattleboro, Vermont soon after Chapin's birth, and he was raised in Brattleboro and educated by a private tutor.

Chapin graduated from Harvard College in 1823, studied medicine under a doctor in Boston, and became a physician in Springfield, Massachusetts. In 1831, Chapin moved back to Brattleboro, where he gave up the practice of medicine for a career in business and public service. Active in politics as a Democrat, he was a longtime deputy sheriff of Windham County, represented Brattleboro in the Vermont House of Representatives from 1833 to 1834, and was Brattleboro's longtime town meeting moderator.

In addition to his public service career, Chapin was active in several business ventures, including serving on the board of directors of the Vermont Mutual Insurance Company and the Vermont Valley Railroad. In 1831, Chapin was one of the incorporators of the Bennington and Brattleboro Railroad. In 1843, he was an original incorporator of the Brattleboro' and Fitchburg Railroad. He was also active in Brattleboro's volunteer fire department and the Vermont State Agricultural Society, and was often consulted by doctors in Windham County even though he had given up actively practicing medicine. On several occasions, Chapin was appointed as disbursing agent for funds used in the construction of state government buildings in Southern Vermont, including facilities in Rutland and Windsor. In 1845, he was an unsuccessful Democratic candidate for the Vermont Senate. In 1850, he was the unsuccessful Democratic nominee for Sheriff of Windham County.

In 1853, Chapin was appointed United States Marshal for the District of Vermont, succeeding John Pettes. He served until the end of the administration of President Franklin Pierce, and was succeeded by Lewis S. Partridge.

In 1871, Chapin suffered a stroke which left him partially paralyzed. He died at his Brattleboro home on January 6, 1878. Chapin was buried at Prospect Hill Cemetery in Brattleboro. His death occurred on the 48th anniversary of his second marriage.

== Family ==
In 1827, Chapin married Elizabeth B. Bridge (1807–1828) of Charlestown, Massachusetts. They were the parents of a daughter, Elizabeth Alice Chapin (1828–1875), the wife of Joseph Clark (1815-1871) of Brattleboro. In 1830, Chapin married Sophia Dwight Orne (1810–1880) of Springfield, Massachusetts. They were the parents of Lucinda Orne (Chapin) Wheelwright, Oliver Howard Chapin, Mary Wells (Chapin) Warder, William Orne Chapin, and Charles Jones Chapin.

== Legacy ==
For many years, Chapin was the owner of the home formerly occupied by publisher John Holbrook. The home, now known as the Deacon John Holbrook House, was added to the National Register of Historic Places in 1982.

Brattleboro's Chapin Street, which was developed in the mid-1880s, is named for Charles Chapin. It is near the Deacon John Holbrook House, covers one block between Oak and Linden Streets, and was constructed on land previously owned by Chapin.

== Sources ==
=== Books ===
- Burnham, Henry (1880). Hemenway, Abby Maria (ed.). Brattleboro, Windham County, Vermont: Early History, with Biographical Sketches of some of its Citizens. Brattleboro, VT: D. Leonard. p. 134 – via Internet Archive.
- Dwight, Benjamin Woodridge (1874). The History of the Descendants of John Dwight, of Dedham, Mass. Vol. II. New York, NY: John F. Trow & Son. p. 866 – via Google Books.
- Howe, Marjorie (2000). Gravestone Listings of Prospect Hill Cemetery, Brattleboro, VT. Brattleboro, VT: M. V. Howe. p. 10. "Chapin, Charles, born 10 Jul 1803, died 6 Jan 1878, son of Oliver and Mary Chapin"
- Plummer, Steve J. (2020). The Wheelwright Genealogy. Cloth Wrap Publishing. p. 89. ISBN 978-1-4457-3159-9 – via Google Books.
- Vermont General Assembly (1843). Acts and Resolves Passed by the General Assembly of the State of Vermont at Their October Session, 1843. Montpelier, VT: E. P. Walton & Sons. pp. 58–63 – via Google Books.

=== Internet ===
- Strahan, derek (October 12, 2018). "Deacon John Holbrook House, Brattleboro, Vermont". Lost New England.com. Lost New England.
- Strahan, Derek (November 9, 2018). "Chapin Street, Brattleboro, Vermont". Lost New England.com. Lost New England.
- "Massachusetts Town and Vital Records, 1620-1988, Birth Entry for Charles Oliver Chapin". Ancestry.com. Lehi, UT: Ancestry.com LLC. July 10, 1803.

=== Newspapers ===
- "Rail-Road Bill". State Journal. Montpelier, VT. October 31, 1831. p. 4 – via Newspapers.com.
- "Democratic District Convention". Vermont Gazette. Bennington, VT. July 25, 1843. p. 2 – via Newspapers.com.
- "Vermont Democratic Nominations". Spirit of the Age. Woodstock, VT. July 31, 1845. p. 2 – via Newspapers.com.
- "Windham County Convention". Green Mountain Freeman. Montpelier, VT. August 22, 1850. p. 2 – via Newspapers.com.
- "Vermont State Agricultural Society". Vermont Watchman & State Journal. Montpelier, VT. December 16, 1852. p. 1 – via Newspapers.com.
