= Jacob Kent Jr. =

U.S. Marshal for Vermont

United States Marshal for the District of Vermont
- In office 1845–1849
- Preceded by: William Barron
- Succeeded by: John Pettes

Sheriff of Orange County, Vermont
- In office 1842–1844
- Preceded by: Asa Story
- Succeeded by: Hoel Sayre

Personal details
- Born: April 26, 1800 Newbury, Vermont, U.S.
- Died: March 13, 1886 (aged 85) Newbury, Vermont, U.S.
- Resting place: Oxbow Cemetery, Newbury, Vermont
- Party: Democratic
- Spouse: Nancy J. (Smith) Mattocks (m. 1870, div. 1881)
- Occupation: Farmer; Hotelier; Government official

Jacob Kent Jr. (April 26, 1800 - March 13, 1886) was a farmer, hotel operator, and government official in Vermont. A Democrat, he was most notable for his service as Sheriff of Orange County, Vermont (1842–1844) and United States Marshal for the District of Vermont.

== Biography ==
Jacob Kent Jr. was born in Newbury, Vermont on April 26, 1800, a son of Jacob Kent Sr. (1764-1852) and Martha (Noyes) Kent (1766-1851). Kent was raised and educated in Newbury, and became a farmer. In the 1830s and 1840s, he was the proprietor of the Coosuck House hotel in Wells River, Vermont. A noted horseman, Kent joined the militia as a young man, and advanced from private to commander of the Newbury-area regiment with the rank of colonel, a post his father had previously held.

Kent was active in the Democratic Party, and served as Sheriff of Orange County from 1842 to 1844. He was appointed as a Deputy United States Marshal in 1830, 1840, and 1850, and was responsible for conducting the United States Census in Orange County. For several years, Kent was a trustee of Norwich University. In 1845, Kent was appointed United States Marshal for the District of Vermont and he served until 1849.

In the early 1850s, he relocated to Chicago, where he was active in several business enterprises. At the start of the American Civil War, Kent accompanied a relative, Loren Kent, who was an officer in the 29th Illinois Infantry Regiment, which he eventually commanded as a colonel. Kent traveled with the 29th Illinois, and was present at the April 1862 Battle of Shiloh.

Kent returned to Vermont in 1866 after inheriting the Newbury property of his sister Anna. He then took up residence on the family farm, where he lived with his brother Clark, who died in 1884. In 1879, Kent was injured when he was thrown from a carriage, but he recovered and continued to remain active on the farm. He continued to remain active in politics and attended several local and county Democratic conventions as a delegate.

Beginning in 1826, Kent was involved in Freemasonry. He was the master of the Newbury lodge when it closed in 1834 as a result of the Anti-Masonic movement that was active from the 1820s to the 1840s. Kent maintained his interest in Masonry and was a recipient of the Royal Arch Masonry degrees. When in his 80s, Kent was known to walk from Newbury to Bradford (about 8 miles) in order to take part in meetings of Bradford's Royal Arch lodge.

Kent remained a bachelor until 1870, when he married a widow, Nancy J. (Smith) Mattocks. They began divorce proceedings in 1880, when Kent was listed in the census as unmarried and living with his brother Clark. The divorce was finalized in January 1881. In 1884, Nancy Smith married Benjamin B. Darling of Lyndon, Vermont.

In the last year of his life, Kent became increasingly ill. He died at his Newbury home on March 13, 1886. He had a Masonic funeral honors and was interred at Oxbow Cemetery in Newbury.

== Sources ==
=== Books ===
- Wells, Frederic Palmer (1902). History of Newbury, Vermont. St. Johnsbury, VT: The Caledonian Company – via Google Books.

=== Internet ===
- "Vermont Vital Records, 1720-1908, Marriage Entry for Jacob Kent and Nancy J. (Smith) Mattocks". Ancestry.com. Lehi, UT: Ancestry.com, LLC. November 23, 1870.
- "1880 United States Federal Census for Jacob Kent". Ancestry.com. Lehi, UT: Ancestry.com, LLC. June 24, 1880.
- "Vermont Vital Records 1720-1908, Marriage Entry for Benjamin B. Darling and Nancy J. (Smith) Mattocks". Ancestry.com. Lehi, UT: Ancestry.com, LLC. August 4, 1884.
- "U.S. Marshals for the District of Vermont, 1791-1994" (PDF). US Marshals.gov. Washington, DC: United States Marshals Service. 1994.

=== Newspapers ===
- "Newbury: Jacob Kent". Green Mountain Freeman. Montpelier, VT. September 3, 1879 – via Newspapers.com.
- "Newbury: Mr. Jacob Kent". Vermont Journal. Windsor, VT. May 1, 1880 – via Newspapers.com.
- "Personal News Items: Col. Jacob Kent". Argus and Patriot. Montpelier, VT. May 5, 1880 – via Newspapers.com.
- "Jacob Kent vs. Nancy Kent". Argus and Patriot. Montpelier, VT. January 12, 1881 – via Newspapers.com.
- "List of Delegates". Argus and Patriot. Montpelier, VT. June 11, 1884 – via Newspapers.com.
- "Newbury: Col. Jacob Kent". St. Johnsbury Republican. St. Johnsbury, VT. March 11, 1886 – via Newspapers.com.
