= Truman B. Ransom =

Vermont educator and military officer (1802–1847)

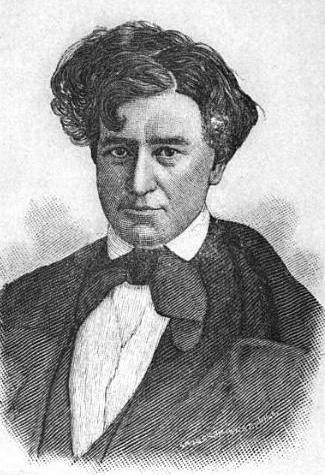
- Born: September 20, 1802; Woodstock, Vermont, U.S.
- Died: September 13, 1847 (aged 44) Chapultepec, Mexico
- Buried: Fairview Cemetery; Norwich, Vermont, U.S.
- Allegiance: United States
- Branch: Vermont Militia; United States Army
- Service years: 1830s–1840s (Vermont Militia); 1847 (Army)
- Rank: Colonel (U.S.); Major general (Vermont)
- Commands: 3rd Division (Vermont Militia); 9th U.S. Infantry (Army)
- Conflicts: Mexican–American War: Battle of Contreras; Battle of Churubusco; Battle of Molino del Rey; Mexico City Campaign; Battle of Chapultepec †
- Other work: Professor and President, Norwich University

Truman Bishop Ransom (September 20, 1802 – September 13, 1847) was a Vermont educator and military officer who served as President of Norwich University and commander of a regiment in the Mexican–American War. He was killed at the Battle of Chapultepec.

== Early life and education ==
Truman B. Ransom was born in Woodstock, Vermont on September 20, 1802. At age 13 he was apprenticed as a chair-maker and painter. At age 16 he began attendance at the American Literary, Scientific and Military Academy, now called Norwich University, alternating semesters with work for his employer in Quechee, Vermont to pay his tuition.

== Career ==
Ransom graduated in 1825 and began a career as an educator, teaching at several colleges started or overseen by Norwich University founder Alden Partridge, or that operated on his Norwich University model, including Jefferson College in Mississippi. In 1835 Ransom became Vice President of Norwich University and was also appointed professor of natural philosophy and engineering.

Ransom volunteered for the militia in the 1830s, and advanced through the ranks from captain to major general, gaining experience as a drill master and commander of units from company to brigade. In 1836 he received his Master of Arts degree from Norwich. From 1837 to 1844 Ransom served as commander of the Vermont Militia's 3rd Division with the rank of major general, and he published a manual on tactics for militia that was distributed throughout United States, Military Tactics and Instructions For The Use Of The Volunteers and Militia of the United States. In 1844 Ransom was appointed Norwich University's President, the first to hold the office after Alden Partridge.

In the 1830s and 1840s Ransom was part of a group of individuals interested in reorganizing and revitalizing the state militias, which had become increasingly dormant in the years following the War of 1812. This group, including Franklin Pierce, Alden Partridge, Alonzo Jackman, and Frederic Williams Hopkins, held seminars to discuss tactics, strategy and recruiting, and carry out maneuvers and drills in an effort to improve unit readiness.

A Democrat, Ransom ran unsuccessfully for the United States House of Representatives in 1840. He ran again in 1843, losing twice to Jacob Collamer. In 1846 he was the unsuccessful Democratic nominee for lieutenant governor, losing to Leonard Sargeant.

== Mexican–American War ==
Ransom volunteered to serve in the Mexican War and, on February 16, 1847, was appointed as the Major of the newly formed 9th Infantry Regiment under the command of Colonel Franklin Pierce. He was quickly promoted to lieutenant colonel and second in command, and when Pierce was promoted to brigadier general and took command of a brigade, Ransom was promoted to colonel on March 16 and given command of the regiment (which was officially organized on April 9).

The regiment served in the Mexico City campaign and was in the Battle of Contreras, Battle of Churubusco, and Battle of Molino del Rey.

Ransom fell at the head of the regiment on September 13, 1847, shot through the head while storming the works at Chapultepec on the outskirts of Mexico City. He was succeeded by Jones M. Withers as commander of the regiment.

He was remembered by Richard Coulter Drum, a member of the 9th Infantry who participated in the battle and went on to serve as Adjutant General of the United States Army, as "by all odds the most brilliant man under fire I have ever seen." In response to an inquiry years after Ransom's death, Drum expressed his admiration for Ransom by writing "In all my experience in the army, I never knew so complete and perfect a soldier as Colonel Truman B. Ransom."

== Death and burial ==
Ransom was temporarily buried in Mexico City's Protestant cemetery, and later returned to Vermont and interred at Norwich's Fairview Cemetery. His eulogy was spoken by Frederic Williams Hopkins, the Adjutant General of Vermont, who had worked with Ransom to revitalize the militia.

== Legacy ==
Norwich University's Ransom Hall is named for Truman Ransom. Battery Ransom, an artillery fortification that stood on Fort Jackson, Louisiana was also named for him. In addition, the Vermont Army National Guard's 1st Squadron, 172nd Cavalry Regiment (Mountain) uses the unofficial nickname "Ransom Guards" to acknowledge the militia unit formed in Saint Albans, Vermont in 1856.

== Family ==
Ransom married Margaretta Morrison Greenfield in 1830. They had seven children: Dunbar Richard (1831–1897); Thomas Edwin Greenfield (1834–1864); Mary Rozella (1837–1843); George Richard (1839–1845); Frederick Eugene (1841–1918); Mary Rozella (named for a sister who predeceased her, born and died in 1843); and Catherine Harriet (b. 1846).

Thomas Edwin Greenfield Ransom served as a brevet major general in the Union Army during American Civil War and died in service on October 29, 1864. Dunbar Ransom served as a Civil War officer and later became a railroad executive before dying in Texas. Frederick Ransom served as a lieutenant in the 11th Illinois Infantry during the Civil War.

Party political offices
| Preceded by Wyllys Lyman | Democratic nominee for Lieutenant Governor of Vermont; 1846 | Succeeded by Charles K. Field |
Academic offices
| Preceded by Alden Partridge | President of Norwich University; 1844–1847 | Succeeded by James Davie Butler |
Military offices
| Preceded by Franklin Pierce | Commander of the 9th Infantry Regiment; March 16, 1847–September 13, 1847 | Succeeded by Jones M. Withers |
