= Frederic Williams Hopkins =

American lawyer and militia officer (1806–1874)

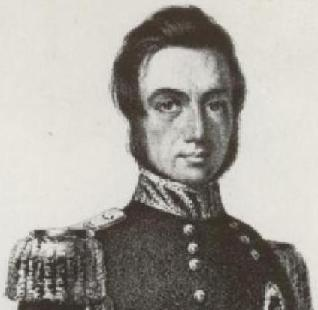
F. W. Hopkins, Vermont Adjutant General from 1837 to 1852.

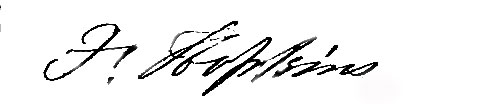
Signature of F. W. Hopkins

Frederic Williams Hopkins (September 15, 1806 – January 21, 1874) was a Vermont lawyer and militia officer who served as Adjutant General of the Vermont Militia.

== Early life ==
Frederic Williams Hopkins was born in Pittsford, Vermont on September 15, 1806. He graduated from Middlebury College in 1828, studied law, and became an attorney in Rutland.

== Legal career ==
He was a long time Rutland Justice of the Peace, and served as Rutland County's Register of Probate from 1832 to 1836 and 1838 to 1839. Hopkins served as Clerk of the Rutland County Courts from 1839 to 1868, and was an organizer of the Rutland Union School District in 1855. He was also an organizer of Rutland's first volunteer fire department.

== Military career ==
Active in the militia during a period between wars when interest was on the wane, he served as Vermont's Adjutant and Inspector General from 1837 to 1852.

In the 1830s and 1840s Hopkins was part of a group of individuals interested in reorganizing and revitalizing the state militias, which had become increasingly dormant in the years following the War of 1812. This group, including Franklin Pierce, Alden Partridge, Alonzo Jackman, and Truman B. Ransom, held seminars to discuss tactics, strategy and recruiting, and carry out maneuvers and drills in an effort to improve unit readiness.

He spoke the eulogy at the memorial service for Truman B. Ransom, the President of Norwich University and a militia officer who was killed in the Mexican–American War while leading his regiment at Chapultepec in 1848.

== Later life ==
Hopkins was praised when he left his sick bed during an extended illness to supervise the removal of records from the Rutland County Court House during a fire on April 3, 1868.

== Death and burial ==
Hopkins died in Rutland on January 23, 1874. He was originally interred in Rutland's West Street Cemetery, and his grave there was one of several that were vandalized in 1891.

His remains were later moved to Rutland's Evergreen Cemetery.

== Family ==
Hopkins was the son of Hiram Hopkins (1777–1847) and Rachel Spotten Hopkins (1773–1839).

He was married twice. His first wife was Julian Ann Hooker (1810–1842) and his second was Ann Eliza Lawrence (1816–1897).

His children included:

- Sarah Hooker Hopkins Woodbury
- Martha Vinal Hopkins
- Anna Larose Lawrence Hopkins Burnham
- Genevieve (Jennie) Andrews Hopkins Enos
- Grace Elizabeth Hopkins Gregory
- William F. Hopkins.

== External resources ==
Frederic Williams Hopkins at Find A Grave

Military offices
Preceded by Martin Flint	Vermont Adjutant General; 1837–1852	Succeeded by Heman R. Smith
