= Hugh H. Henry =

U.S. Marshal for Vermont

United States Marshal for the District of Vermont
- In office July 25, 1865 – December 18, 1869
- Preceded by: Charles C. P. Baldwin
- Succeeded by: George P. Foster

Member of the Vermont Senate from Windsor County
- In office October 13, 1864 – October 11, 1865 Serving with Wendall W. Williams, Clark H. Chapman
- Preceded by: James A. Pollard, Noah B. Safford, Wendall W. Williams
- Succeeded by: Clark H. Chapman, Hosea Doton, Merrick Gay

Personal details
- Born: October 13, 1814 Rockingham, Vermont, U.S.
- Died: December 18, 1869 (aged 55) Chester, Vermont, U.S.
- Resting place: Brookside Cemetery, Chester, Vermont
- Party: Republican
- Other political affiliations: Democratic; Free Soil
- Spouse: Sarah Henry (m. 1836–1867, her death)
- Children: 10
- Education: Dartmouth College
- Occupation: Farmer; Businessman; Government official

Hugh H. Henry (October 13, 1814 – December 18, 1869) was an American farmer, businessman, and politician from Vermont. He was most notable for several terms in the Vermont House of Representatives (six terms between 1839 and 1862), a term in the Vermont Senate (1864), and appointment as United States Marshal for Vermont (1865 to 1869).

== Early life ==
Hugh Horatio Henry was born in Rockingham, Vermont on October 13, 1814, a son of Hugh Horatio Henry (1767–1847) and Elizabeth Susan (Dodge) Henry (1781–1831). He was raised in Chester, Vermont, where his father owned a successful farm. Henry attended the public schools of Chester and graduated from Dartmouth College in 1833. After the death of his father, Henry inherited the family farm, which made him wealthy.

== Start of career ==
Originally a Democrat, he represented Chester in the Vermont House of Representatives six times between 1839 and 1862. He became increasingly opposed to slavery in the 1840s, and joined the Free Soil Party in 1848. In the late 1840s, Henry was an original incorporator of the Vermont Valley Railroad between Bellows Falls and Brattleboro, Vermont. He was chosen as its first president, and served until his death. At the time of his death, Henry was the longest-tenured railroad president in the United States. Henry was also a longtime member of the board of directors for the Bank of Bellows Falls.

== Continued career ==
When the Republican Party was formed in the 1850s as the main anti-slavery party in the United States, Henry became an early adherent. Henry was a delegate to the 1860 Republican National Convention. With the rest of the state's delegation, Henry supported Jacob Collamer for president on the first ballot as a favorite son. Most members of the Vermont delegation intended to change their support to William H. Seward, the frontrunner, but Henry backed Abraham Lincoln and lobbied Vermont delegates and those from nearby states. Lincoln won the nomination on the third ballot, and went on to win the presidency.

In 1864, Henry was elected to the Vermont Senate from Windsor County, and he served one term. During his Senate term, Henry served as chairman of the body's Committee on Banking.

== U.S. Marshal ==
In March 1865, Vermont's Congressional delegation recommended Henry to serve as U.S. Marshal for Vermont. He was appointed in July 1865, and continued to serve until his death. During his term, the Fenian Brotherhood, an organization of Irish Republicans, attempted to attack the British dominion of Canada from staging areas in Vermont. Henry took steps to prevent the Fenians from receiving weapons or traveling to Canada, and later oversaw their dispersal and departure from the state.

== Death and burial ==
Henry suffered a stroke and died in Chester on December 18, 1869. His funeral was held at his home and was attended by prominent Vermonters including Judge David Allen Smalley and General George J. Stannard. He was buried at Brookside Cemetery in Chester.

== Family ==
In 1836, Henry married Sarah Henry (1812–1867). They were the parents of ten children -- Mary, Hugh, Martha D., Julia, Clark, Charles F., Arthur H., Patrick, William and Sarah E.

== Sources ==
=== Newspapers ===
- "Recommendations: Hugh H. Henry and D. C. Denison". Vermont Transcript. St. Albans, VT. March 31, 1865. p. 2 – via Newspapers.com.
- "Appointments: Dudley C. Denison and Hugh H. Henry". Vermont Journal. Windsor, VT. July 29, 1865. p. 8 – via Newspapers.com.
- "The Late Hugh H. Henry". Burlington Free Press. Burlington, VT. December 21, 1869. p. 3 – via Newspapers.com.
- "The Funeral of Hon. Hugh H. Henry". Burlington Free Press. Burlington, VT. December 21, 1869. p. 3 – via Newspapers.com.

=== Internet ===
- "Vermont Vital Records, 1720-1908, Death Entry for Hugh H. Henry". Ancestry.com. Lehi, UT: Ancestry.com, LLC.

=== Books ===
- Child, Hamilton (1884). Gazetteer and Business Directory of Windsor County, Vt. for 1883-84. Syracuse, NY: Syracuse Journal. pp. 117-118 – via Internet Archive.
- Vermont Senate (1865). Journal of the Senate of the State of Vermont. Montpelier, VT: Freeman Steam Printing Establishment – via HathiTrust.
