= John Pettes =

U.S. Marshal for Vermont

United States Marshal for the District of Vermont
- In office 1849–1853
- Preceded by: Jacob Kent Jr.
- Succeeded by: Charles Chapin

Sheriff of Windsor County, Vermont
- In office 1837–1839
- Preceded by: Daniel Bowen
- Succeeded by: Joel Lull

Personal details
- Born: March 17, 1793 Amherst, Massachusetts, U.S.
- Died: March 24, 1868 (aged 75) Windsor, Vermont, U.S.
- Resting place: Old South Cemetery, Windsor, Vermont
- Party: Whig
- Spouse: Lucy Richards (m. 1820-1849, her death)
- Children: 7
- Occupation: Farmer; Businessman; Government official

John Pettes (March 17, 1793 - March 24, 1868) was a businessman and public official who was active in Windsor, Vermont. Among the offices in which he served were Sheriff of Windsor County (1837-1839) and United States Marshal for the District of Vermont (1849-1853).

== Early life ==
John Pettes was born in Amherst, Massachusetts on March 17, 1793, a son of Joseph Pettes (1757-1811) and Charlotte (Wales) Pettes (1761-1849). Joseph Pettes moved his family to Windsor, Vermont in 1800, where he operated a coffee house and hotel. After his death, Charlotte Pettes took over management of the business, which she operated until the early 1840s.

== Business career ==
After the Pettes family's move to Vermont, John Pettes was educated in the schools of Windsor, then became the operator of a general store in Windsor, which he owned in partnership with his brother Frederick. Pettes also became active in the Vermont Militia; in 1820, he was first lieutenant of the Jefferson Artillery, a Windsor battery commanded by Allen Wardner with the rank of captain. Pettes advanced through the militia's officer grades to become a major in a Windsor-area unit, and afterwards was frequently addressed by his rank.

Among the other ventures Pettes pursued in addition to the store were an ownership stake in the Cornish–Windsor Covered Bridge, a wool brokerage partnership, real estate sales, serving on the board of directors of the Bank of Woodstock, importing and reselling foreign goods transported to Vermont via steamboat on the Connecticut River, an interest in a fire insurance company, and owning and managing a family farm. In 1833, he was one of the incorporators of the Ascutney Mill Dam Company. In 1845, he was an original incorporator of the Vermont Railroad Iron Company, which manufactured rails and other railroad train and track components.

== Murder of Homer Cooper ==
In June 1842, the family of John Pettes was reported on in newspapers throughout the United States in connection with a murder that took place on the Pettes farm. According to contemporary newspaper accounts, a crew of laborers including several of Pettes's sons and a man named Peter McCue were working on the farm. The group included Pettes's son Frederick Dudley Pettes, who was about 11 years old, and a local African American boy, Homer Cooper, who was four. As the adults left the field where they had been working, McCue told the group he was going to return and provide additional assistance to the boys. Instead, he attacked them with two hoes. Both boys were severely injured, but Frederick Pettes was able to run for help. McCue fled by attempting to swim to the New Hampshire side of the Connecticut River, but drowned before he reached the shore. Cooper later died as the result of his injuries. Frederick Pettes recovered, served as Deputy U.S. Marshal for Vermont during his father's term as Marshal, and later owned and operated the family farm.

== Public official ==
A Whig, Pettes was active in Vermont's politics and government. He served as Sheriff of Windsor County from 1837 to 1839. In 1849, he was appointed United States Marshal for the District of Vermont, succeeding Jacob Kent Jr. He served until 1853, and was succeeded by Charles Chapin.

== Later life ==
For many years, Pettes suffered from a tumor which started near a place on his neck where he had been injured after he was thrown from a horse and impaled on a fence. The tumor negatively affected his breathing and disfigured his face, and in his later life Pettes became a near-recluse as a result. In 1867, his hip and leg were broken when the horse he was attempting to bridle knocked him down, after which he was confined to his bedroom.

== Death and burial ==
Pettes died in Windsor on March 24, 1868. He was buried at Old South Cemetery in Windsor.

== Family ==
In 1820, Pettes married Lucy Richards (1799-1849) of Dorchester, Massachusetts. They were the parents of seven children who lived to adulthood:

- William R. (1821-1881)
- Mary E. (1823-1841)
- John Jr. (1825-1866)
- Edward C. (1829-1877)
- Frederick D. (1831-1907)
- Robert T. (1833-1867)
- Lucy E. (1834-1911)

== Sources ==
=== Newspapers ===
- Green, Isaac (December 16, 1816). "Meeting Notice, the Proprietors of Cornish Bridge". Vermont Journal. Windsor, VT – via Newspapers.com.
- Phelps, Francis E. (January 2, 1826). "Notice of Incorporation, Ascutney Fire Insurance Company". Vermont Republican & American Yeoman. Windsor, VT – via Newspapers.com.
- "Wool Purchase Notice, Thomas Emerson, Fred. Pettes, John Pettes". American Whig. Woodstock, VT. June 6, 1831 – via Newspapers.com.
- "Directors of the Bank of Woodstock for the Year Ensuing". Vermont Republican & Journal. Woodstock, VT. January 19, 1833 – via Newspapers.com.
- Pettes, John (December 12, 1834). "Notice: Farm for Sale". Vermont Courier. Woodstock, VT – via Newspapers.com.
- "Whig State Convention (1839)". Vergennes Vermonter. Vergennes, VT. July 3, 1839 – via Newspapers.com.
- "Death Notice, Mary Elizabeth Pettes". The North Star. Danville, VT. August 5, 1841 – via Newspapers.com.
- "Shocking Murder". Vermont Mercury. Woodstock, VT. June 10, 1842 – via Newspapers.com.
- "Murder in Windsor". The Commercial Advertiser. Buffalo, NY. June 14, 1842 – via Newspapers.com.
- "Mord". Der Liberale Beobachter (in German). Reading, PA. June 14, 1842 – via Newspapers.com.
- "Attempted Murder". Democratic Free Press. Detroit, MI. June 15, 1842 – via Newspapers.com.
- "Murder -- Quick Retribution". Bennington Banner. Bennington, VT. June 21, 1842 – via Newspapers.com.
- Pettes, John (November 15, 1845). "Notice: Fresh Goods at the West End of Cornish Bridge". Vermont Journal. Windsor, VT – via Newspapers.com.
- "Death Notice: Helen H. Pettes". Vermont Chronicle. Bellows Falls, VT. June 16, 1847 – via Newspapers.com.
- "Appointments by the President". Middlebury Register. Middlebury, VT. March 20, 1849 – via Newspapers.com.
- "Deaths: Charlotte Wales Pettes". Vermont Chronicle. Bellows falls, VT. June 6, 1849 – via Newspapers.com.
- "Death Notice, Mrs. Lucy Richards". Aurora of the Valley. Newbury, VT. June 9, 1849 – via Newspapers.com.
- "Windsor Co. Agricultural Society". The Woodstock Mercury. Woodstock, VT. January 25, 1850 – via Newspapers.com.
- "Vermont Appointments". Burlington Free Press. Burlington, VT. April 6, 1853 – via Newspapers.com.
- "Whig State Convention (1856)". Burlington Sentinel. Burlington, VT. October 16, 1856 – via Newspapers.com.
- "Death Notice, John Pettes, Jr". Vermont Chronicle. Bellows falls, VT. June 30, 1866 – via Newspapers.com.
- "Maj. John Pettis (sic) of Windsor met with a severe accident". Vermont Journal. Windsor, VT. September 7, 1867 – via Newspapers.com.
- "Death Notice, Robert Thaxter Pettes". Vermont Journal. Windsor, VT. October 5, 1867 – via Newspapers.com.
- M. D. (April 11, 1868). "The Late Maj. John Pettes". Vermont Journal and Farmer. Windsor, VT – via Newspapers.com.
- "Miscellaneous: Capt. Edward C. Pettes". Vermont Journal. Windsor, VT. December 15, 1877 – via Newspapers.com.
- "Death Notice, Frederick Dudley Pettes". Rutland Herald. Rutland, VT. February 18, 1907 – via Newspapers.com.
- "Obituary, Frederick Dudley Pettes". Vermont Journal. Windsor, VT. March 2, 1907 – via Newspapers.com.
- "Death Notice, Lucy Ellen Sabin". Vermont Journal. Windsor, VT. March 10, 1911 – via Newspapers.com.

=== Internet ===
- "Massachusetts Town and Vital Records, 1620-1988, Marriage Entry for John Pettes and Lucy Richards". Ancestry.com. Lehi, UT: Ancestry.com LLC. January 20, 1820.
- "Vermont Vital Records, 1720-1908, Death Record for John Pettes". Ancestry.com. Lehi, UT: Ancestry.com LLC. March 24, 1868.
- "1850 United States Federal Census, Entry for Edward C. Pettes". Ancestry.com. Lehi, UT: Ancestry.com LLC. July 29, 1850.
- Habben, David M. (February 17, 2013). "Gravestone Photo, William Richards Pettes, St. Johns Episcopal Cemetery, Tallahassee, Florida". Cemetery Photos, Leon County, Florida. Florida Cemeteries Project.

=== Books ===
- The Vermont Register and Yearbook for the Year of Our Lord 1820 (PDF). Burlington, VT: E. & T. Mills. 1820 – via Ancestral Trackers.net.
- Child, Hamilton (1884). Gazetteer and Business Directory of Windsor County, Vt., for 1883-84. Syracuse, NY: Syracuse Journal – via Internet Archive.
- Vermont General Assembly (1832). Acts and Laws Passed by the Legislature of the State of Vermont at Their October Session, 1832. Montpelier, VT: Vermont Secretary of State – via Google Books.
- Vermont General Assembly (1845). Acts and Laws Passed by the Legislature of the State of Vermont at Their October Session, 1845. Burlington, VT: Chauncey Goodrich – via Google Books.
