= William Barron (U.S. Marshal) =

U.S. Marshal for Vermont

United States Marshal for the District of Vermont
- In office March 10, 1841 – March 14, 1845
- Preceded by: Heman Lowry
- Succeeded by: Jacob Kent Jr.

Sheriff of Orange County, Vermont
- In office 1840–1841
- Preceded by: Asa Story
- Succeeded by: Asa Story
- In office 1830–1831
- Preceded by: Abel Carter
- Succeeded by: Lyman Fitch

Personal details
- Born: June 23, 1787 Lyndeborough, New Hampshire, U.S.
- Died: October 25, 1872 (aged 85) Hartford, Connecticut, U.S.
- Resting place: Fairview Cemetery, Norwich, Vermont
- Party: Whig
- Spouse(s): Amelia Bailey (m. 1810-1816, her death); Hannah Davis Brooks (m. 1822-1872, his death)
- Children: 6
- Occupation: Businessman; Government official

William Barron (June 23, 1787 – October 25, 1872) was a businessman and public official from Bradford, Vermont. He was most notable for his service as Sheriff of Orange County, Vermont (1830-1831, 1840–1841) and United States Marshal for the District of Vermont (1841-1845).

== Biography ==
William Barron was born in Lyndeborough, New Hampshire on June 23, 1787, the son of Micah Barron and Elizabeth (Pearson) Barron. He was raised and educated in Bradford, Vermont and became a successful merchant, first in partnership with his father in Bradford, and later as the proprietor of a store in Corinth.

Micah Barron, nicknamed "Colonel Mike", was a prominent official in Vermont, including serving as an officer in the state militia, deputy sheriff of Orange County and county sheriff. William Barron followed his father into government service, and served as a deputy sheriff for Orange County. He joined the Whig Party and served as sheriff from 1830 to 1831, and again from 1840 to 1841. In addition, William Barron was an active militia officer and attained the rank of colonel as commander of 1st Regiment, 2nd Brigade, 4th Division. In 1841, Barron was appointed United States Marshal for the District of Vermont, and he served until 1845.

Barron later relocated to Norwich, Vermont. In retirement, he was a resident of Hartford, Connecticut. Barron died in Hartford on October 25, 1872. He was buried at Fairview Cemetery in Norwich.

== Family ==
Barron's first wife was Amelia Bailey of Bradford, with whom he was the father of two daughters, Elizabeth and Mary. Elizabeth Barron was the wife of Joseph M. Bean of Lyme, New Hampshire. Mary was the wife of Silas Burbank of Montpelier, Vermont.

Amelia died in 1816. In 1822, Barron married Hannah Davis Brooks, the widow of William Trotter. With his second wife, Barron was the father of two sons and two daughters. William Trotter Barron became an attorney and judge in Chicago before dying in a railroad accident in 1862. Everett Barron was a hotelier in Faribault, Minnesota. Charlotte Barron was the wife of Edward Rogers of Hartford, Connecticut. Catherine Isabella Barron lived with her parents and died at age 29.

== Sources ==
=== Books ===
- Deming, Leonard (1851). Catalogue of the Principal Officers of Vermont. Middlebury, VT: L. Deming. pp. 84, 86 – via Internet Archive.
- McKeen, Silas (1875). A History of Bradford, Vermont. Montpelier, VT: J. D. Clark & Son. pp. 191–193 – via Google Books.
- U.S. Senate (1969). Journal of the Executive Proceedings of the Senate of the United States. Vol. 6, 1841–45. New York, NY: Johnson Reprint Corporation. p. 441 – via Google Books.
- The Vermont Register & Almanack. Burlington, VT: E. & T. Mills. 1819. pp. 99–100 – via Internet Archive.

=== Internet ===
- "New Hampshire Births and Christenings Index, 1714-1904, Entry for William Barron". Ancestry.com. Lehi, UT: Ancestry.com, LLC.

=== Newspapers ===
- "Whig Convention". Rutland Weekly Herald. Rutland, VT. July 14, 1834. p. 3 – via Newspapers.com.
- Greeley, Horace (March 20, 1841). "Appointments by the President and Senate: Marshals". The New-Yorker. New York, NY. p. 11 – via Google Books.
