= Long Ding =

Chinese college athlete

Profile
- Position: Placekicker

Personal information
- Born: February 11, 1988 (age 38); Qingdao, China
- Listed height: 6 ft 0 in (1.83 m)
- Listed weight: 209 lb (95 kg)

Career information
- College: Dean (2008–2009); Norwich (2010–2011)
- NFL draft: 2012: undrafted

Long Ding (born February 11, 1988) is a Chinese former professional American football kicker. He was originally a member of the IFAF/USA Football International Student Program, before entering college football after his arrival in the United States in 2007. He tried out for the Jacksonville Jaguars during the 2012 NFL offseason.

== Early life ==
Ding is a native of Qingdao, China.

== College career ==
After his arrival in the US, Dean College in Franklin, Massachusetts was the first team that Ding represented before moving onto Norwich University in Northfield, Vermont.

In 2011, while still a student at Norwich University, Ding was named a finalist for the Fred Mitchell Award. At Norwich, Ding attempted sixteen field goals, making thirteen, with the longest distance to goal measured at 51 yards (47 m). Ding was also active as a defensive player, recording nineteen tackles, six tackles for loss and three sacks.

== Professional career ==
Ding was scouted during the NFL Regional Combine in New York City, as well as the NFL Super Regional Combine in Detroit. He later went on to go undrafted in the 2012 NFL draft.

In May 2012, Ding was invited to a tryout at rookie mini-camp for the Jacksonville Jaguars, along with twenty-six others. Ding stated that he just wants to show the NFL that he has the ability to kick at that level. The Jaguars did not sign Ding to a contract.
