= Lewis Samuel Partridge =

American politician (1818–1886)

Lewis S. Partridge
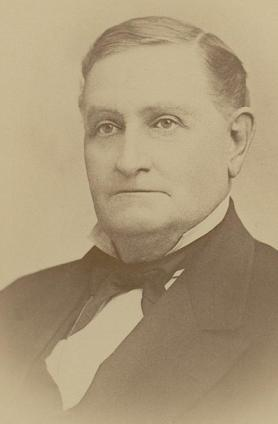

United States Marshal for Vermont
- In office May 2, 1857 – April 12, 1861
- Preceded by: Charles Chapin
- Succeeded by: Charles C. P. Baldwin

Adjutant General of the Vermont Militia
- In office 1853–1854
- Preceded by: Heman R. Smith
- Succeeded by: George Bradley Kellogg

Member of the Vermont House of Representatives
- In office 1852–1854
- Preceded by: Samuel Goddard
- Succeeded by: Franklin L. Olds
- Constituency: Norwich

Personal details
- Born: March 10, 1818 Norwich, Vermont, US
- Died: May 22, 1886 (aged 68) Norwich, Vermont, US
- Resting place: Fairview Cemetery, Norwich, Vermont, US
- Party: Democratic
- Spouse(s): Harriet Baxter (m. 1846); Elizabeth Woodruff (m. 1856)
- Relations: Alden Partridge (uncle)
- Children: 11
- Occupation: Businessman

Lewis Samuel Partridge (March 10, 1818 – May 22, 1886) was an American politician and military leader who served as Vermont's United States Marshal and as Adjutant General of the Vermont Militia.

== Early life and business career ==
Lewis S. Partridge was born in Norwich, Vermont on March 10, 1818. The son of Abel Partridge and Alpa (Lewis) Partridge, he was also the nephew of Norwich University founder Alden Partridge.

Lewis Partridge was educated in Norwich and worked as a store clerk in Norwich and Claremont, New Hampshire. In 1833 he was appointed Norwich's Postmaster, and he graduated from Norwich University in 1838. Partridge's business career prospered, and he became the proprietor of a store in Norwich as well as Norwich's Union Hotel.

As a direct link to Alden Partridge, for many years Lewis Partridge was accorded the honor of serving as marshal of Norwich University's annual commencement exercises.

== Political and military career ==
Partridge was active in Vermont's Democratic Party, even as Vermont became a solid Whig and then Republican state. He served in local offices including Justice of the Peace, and was a member of the Vermont House of Representatives from 1852 to 1854.

Partridge was a member of the Vermont Militia for several years. In the 1840s he held the rank of captain as commander of the 23rd Regiment's Light Infantry Company. From 1852 to 1854 Partridge served as Adjutant General of the Vermont militia. From 1855 to 1857 he again served as town Postmaster.

A supporter of James Buchanan for President in 1856, Partridge was rewarded with appointment as U.S. Marshal for the District of Vermont; he succeeded Charles Chapin, and served from 1857 to 1861. In 1861 he was again appointed Postmaster of Norwich.

== Civil War ==
During the American Civil War Partridge was arrested for alleged Confederate sympathies. In July, 1862 his successor as Marshal, Charles C. P. Baldwin, detained Partridge and others, and charged them with treason. They were accused of protesting by cutting down an American flag at a recruiting office and then using pistols to prevent soldiers from raising it again. Partridge initially traveled to Canada to escape arrest, but later appeared in Burlington to answer the charge and post bail. In 1864 he stood trial for obstructing the draft, and was acquitted.

Partridge was also a Delegate to the 1864 Democratic National Convention.

== Later life ==
Partridge remained active in politics. In 1870 he was an unsuccessful Democratic nominee for the United States House of Representatives, losing to Republican Luke P. Poland.

He attended Democratic meetings in 1872 to argue against a coalition with Liberal Republicans.

In 1884 he served as President of Vermont's Cleveland and Hendricks Club, and when Cleveland took office in 1885 Partridge was again appointed Norwich's Postmaster.

== Death ==
Lewis Partridge died in Norwich on May 22, 1886. He was buried at Fairview Cemetery in Norwich.

== Family ==
On June 16, 1846 Lewis Partridge married Harriet Baxter of Norwich. They had three children: Lewis, Lizzie, and Harriet Louise.

Harriet Baxter Partridge died on August 25, 1854, and on May 27, 1856 Partridge married Elizabeth Woodruff of Tinmouth. They had eight children: Edward, Alliston, Charles, Robert, Marion, Mary, Martha, and William.

Military offices
Preceded by Heman R. Smith	Vermont Adjutant General; 1853–1854	Succeeded by George Bradley Kellogg
