= Heman R. Smith =

American politician

Adjutant General of the Vermont Militia
- In office 1852–1853
- Preceded by: Frederic Williams Hopkins
- Succeeded by: Lewis Samuel Partridge

Member of the Vermont House of Representatives from Hinesburg
- In office 1841–1843
- Preceded by: Jedediah Boynton
- Succeeded by: John S. Patrick

Personal details
- Born: 1795 Hinesburg, Vermont
- Died: September 1, 1861 (aged 65–66) Hinesburg, Vermont
- Resting place: Hinesburg Village Cemetery, Hinesburg, Vermont
- Party: National Republican; Whig; Republican
- Spouse: Harriet Leonard (m. 1822–1861, his death)
- Occupation: Farmer; Militia officer Politician

Heman R. Smith (1795 – September 1, 1861) was a Hinesburg farmer and military officer who served as Adjutant General of the Vermont Militia.

== Biography ==
Heman R. Smith was born in Hinesburg, Vermont in 1795, and was the son of Sagy Smith (1767–1851) and farmer Morris Smith (1769–1850), two of Hinesburg's earliest settlers. He was educated locally and became a farmer. He was also active in the Chittenden County Agricultural Society.

Smith joined the National Republican Party, and later became a Whig, He was active in local government, including terms as a Justice of the Peace and member of the Vermont House of Representatives.

Active in the Vermont Militia, Smith rose through the ranks to command 2nd Brigade, 3rd Division and 2nd Brigade, 1st Division with the rank of brigadier general. From 1843 to 1846 he commanded the 1st Division as a major general.

In 1852 Smith was appointed Vermont's Adjutant General, and he served until 1853. He became a Republican when the party was founded, and was a delegate to the party's Chittenden County convention in 1860.

In 1861 he was considered for appointment as U.S. Marshal for Vermont, but the selection went to Charles C. P. Baldwin.

At the start of the American Civil War Smith was active in recruiting soldiers for the Union Army, and assisted in forming two companies in Hinesburg.

== Death and burial ==
Smith died in Hinesburg on September 1, 1861. He was buried at Hinesburg Village Cemetery.

== Family ==
In 1822, Smith married Harriet Leonard (1799–1881) of Hinesburg. They had no children, and after her husband's death Mrs. Smith continued to reside on and operate the family farm until well into her old age.

Military offices
Preceded by Frederic Williams Hopkins	Vermont Adjutant General; 1852–1853	Succeeded by Lewis Samuel Partridge
