= Paul C. Cameron =

American judge and plantation owner

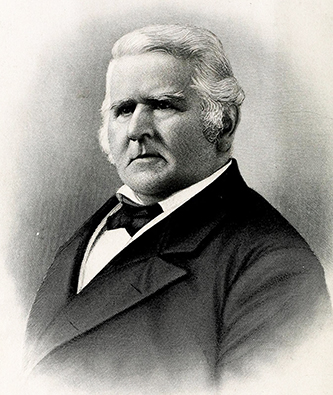
- Photo of Cameron taken in the late 1800s
- Born: September 25, 1808; Durham, North Carolina, United States
- Died: January 6, 1891 (aged 82); Hillsborough, North Carolina, United States
- Occupations: Businessman, plantation owner
- Known for: Wealthy slaveholders in North Carolina
- Spouse: Anne Ruffin (m. 1832)
- Children: 7

Paul Carrington Cameron (1808–1891) was an American judge, railroad builder, and a wealthy plantation and slaveholder in North Carolina. When his father left him the business in the late 1800s, Cameron oversaw the work of 470 slaves across 12,475 acres of land mostly in North Carolina. However, as he got older he grew his business, buying plantations in both Alabama and Mississippi. By about 1860, he owned 30,000 acres of land and 1,900 slaves. Not only did he grow his slave business, but he also invested in the construction of the North Carolina Railroad, owned a few textile mils, and put in considerable stocks in two separate banks.

In 1856 and 1857, he served in the North Carolina Supreme Court, the only time he ran for office. In 1832, Cameron married Anne Ruffin, daughter of Thomas Ruffin, the Supreme Justice of the North Carolina Supreme Court. Cameron was born in Orange County, North Carolina, on September 25, 1808, and died on January 6, 1891, in Hillsborough.

When slavery was abolished in 1865 he ended up selling much of his land to the families of the freed slaves.

== Early life ==
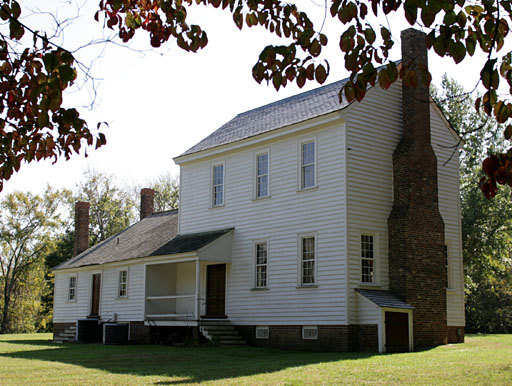
The Bennehan House at the Stagville Plantation, in Durham County, North Carolina

Paul Carrington Cameron, son of Duncan Cameron and Rebecca Bennehan, was born September 25, 1808, at the Stagville plantation, near Durham, North Carolina. In his adult years, he studied law at the University of North Carolina from 1823 to 1825, though he had more of an interest in agricultural reform. From there, Cameron attended the American Literary, Scientific and Military Academy as a forerunner to Norwich University, and graduated in 1828. From 1828 to 1829, Cameron attended Trinity College. He married Anne Ruffin, who was the daughter of Thomas Ruffin, in 1832. Ann died in 1897 after a full life with Cameron, with whom she bore seven children. In 1843, Cameron inherited his uncle's share of the family's estate as well as most of his father's property in 1855.

== Pre-American Civil War ==
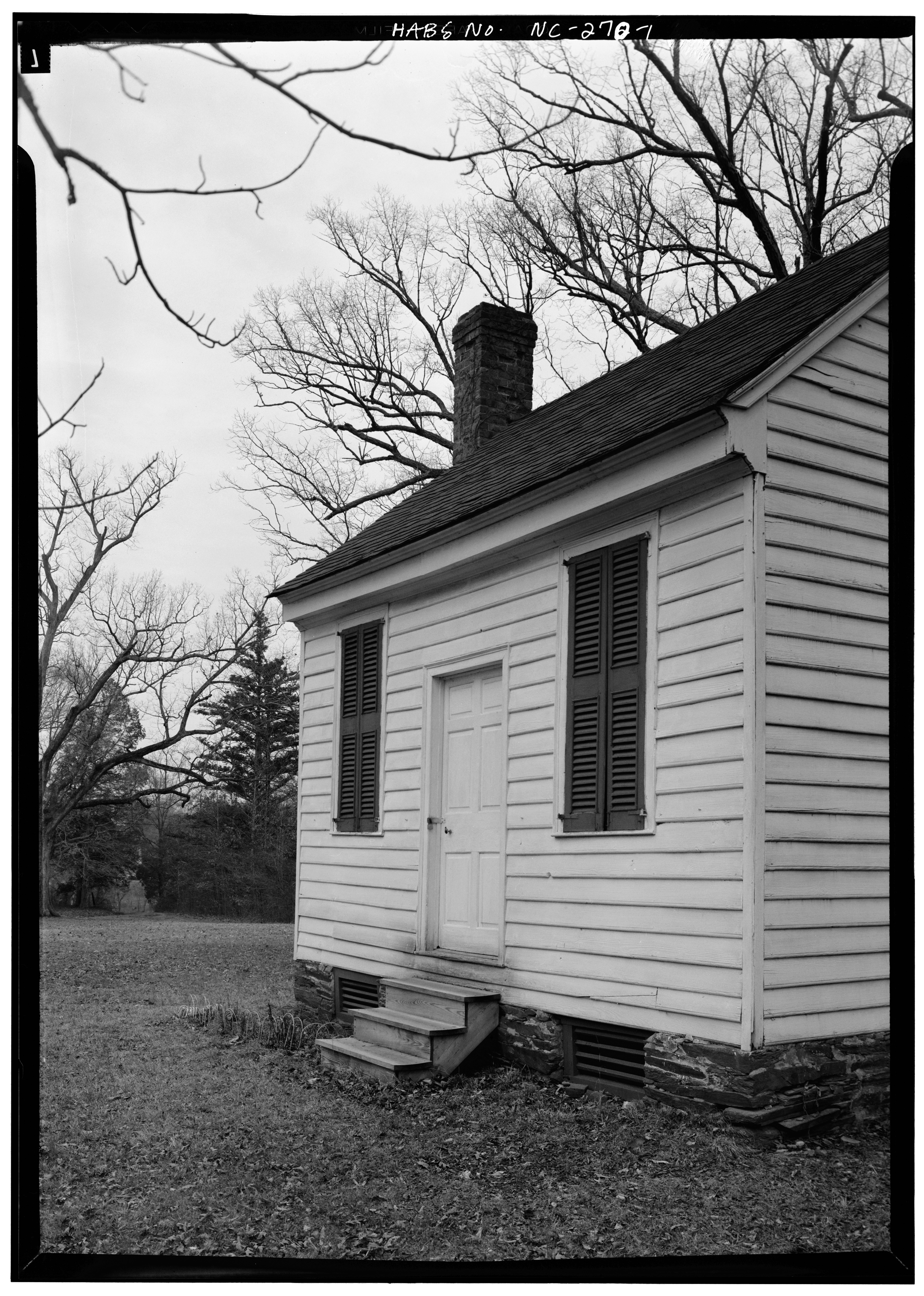
The Office of Thomas Ruffin, Chief Justice in Burnside, Cameron Park, Hillsborough, Orange County, North Carolina

As a profession and due to the inheritance he attained from his father and uncle, Cameron was a paternalistic planter. This meant managing the plantations and the slaves working under him. When Cameron bought more land, he arranged for slaves to be transported to these plantations. However, when transporting and selling slaves, he would make an effort to keep them in family groups. He wrote that he maintained "a mild & humane care of the family of negroes as docile & free from violence & vice as the same number to be found any where in the south… Supplies of food have been regularly distributed from the mills & store houses every seventh day… clothing suited to all classes [has been] distributed to all equally." As stated, Cameron made sure the slaves were treated somewhat humanly, supplying them with food and clothing for the trip. An alternate view of Cameron's treatment of slaves comes from the Historic Sagville historic site, which tells this story: "Elijah, Lucy, and their six children were among those sold from Fish Dam. They were sold to a cotton plantation in Edgecombe County, NC. Within a few weeks of the midnight prayer, Elijah and Lucy tried to return to the community at Stagville. They set out on rough roads with their young children. Like so many freed people, Elijah and Lucy were trying to reclaim their family. Upon hearing this news, Paul Cameron ordered his overseers to post a guard, preparing to use violence to stop the family. The surviving records do not say if Elijah and Lucy made it back to Fish Dam." In May 1865, a Federal officer, Captain Hollister, visited Stagville at Paul Cameron's request. A freed man told him that Cameron was "a hard master, yielding harsh suffering of all sorts." In 1844, Cameron purchased the Greensboro plantation for $29,305 to be paid out in installments over the next three years. In 1853 his father died, leaving him to inherit his father's plantations and slaves.

== Homestead buyers (Post-American Civil War) ==
When slavery was abolished in 1865, Cameron's slaves likewise were no longer required to work in his plantations. However, many of the slaves wanted to stay on the land they'd grown up in, despite the circumstances by which they ended up there. Though Cameron was their previous slaveowner, he ended up selling much of his land to the families of the freed slaves. At first, he was hesitant to sell his land to black buyers, but advocates in America—most specifically Alabama, where much of his land was being sold—gave the freed slaves enough voice to purchase the land.

Cameron ended up selling to Paul Hagris, Jim Harris, Sandy Cameron, and many other freed slaves, turning his acres of plantation land into homesteads. Cameron relied on his nephew, Thomas Roulhac, to handle money transactions as the family's attorney. Cameron clearly stated how much he wanted for his land, but made no mention of race, thus making it so freed slaves could purchase the land.

== Other activities ==
Cameron became a slaveholder in 1855, but it was not the only market in which he showed prevalence. Aside from managing his plantations, he helped to build the North Carolina Railroad in 1849. This railroad passed through Hillsborough, Salisbury, and Concord, expanding trade in those areas and increasing state revenue. Products such as wheat, cotton, and tobacco were transported in abundance, and urban society grew.

Aside from this, he ran for office once in his political career, serving in the North Carolina Supreme Court. He was even close David Swain, the University President of North Carolina. This connection led him to donate funds to the University of North Carolina after the Civil War. Cameron always had a fondness for that school, and he remained a prominent figure in the college until he died in 1891.

== Death ==
Cameron died on January 6, 1891, in Hillsborough. A local newspaper put out a tribute to him after his death, lauding his achievements, speaking of the various organizations and movements he was a benefactor for, including the previously mentioned University of North Carolina and his involvement in the Civil War. Cameron was one of the leaders who built the North Carolina Railroad, increasing the state's revenue. He owned plantations in North Carolina, Alabama, and Mississippi, land from which he ended up selling to the freed slaves who once worked there. He is viewed as a just man who made a big impact on his home state and left people with a positive view. His involvement in the University of North Carolina and support was shown not only by his contribution, but by his continued interest in the school's commencement, whether that was financially or other. Though Cameron was a prominent slaveholder in North Carolina, he made a name for himself in his social activities and personal life, all of which contributed to his countrymen.
