= Alonzo Jackman =

American educator and military officer (1809–1879)

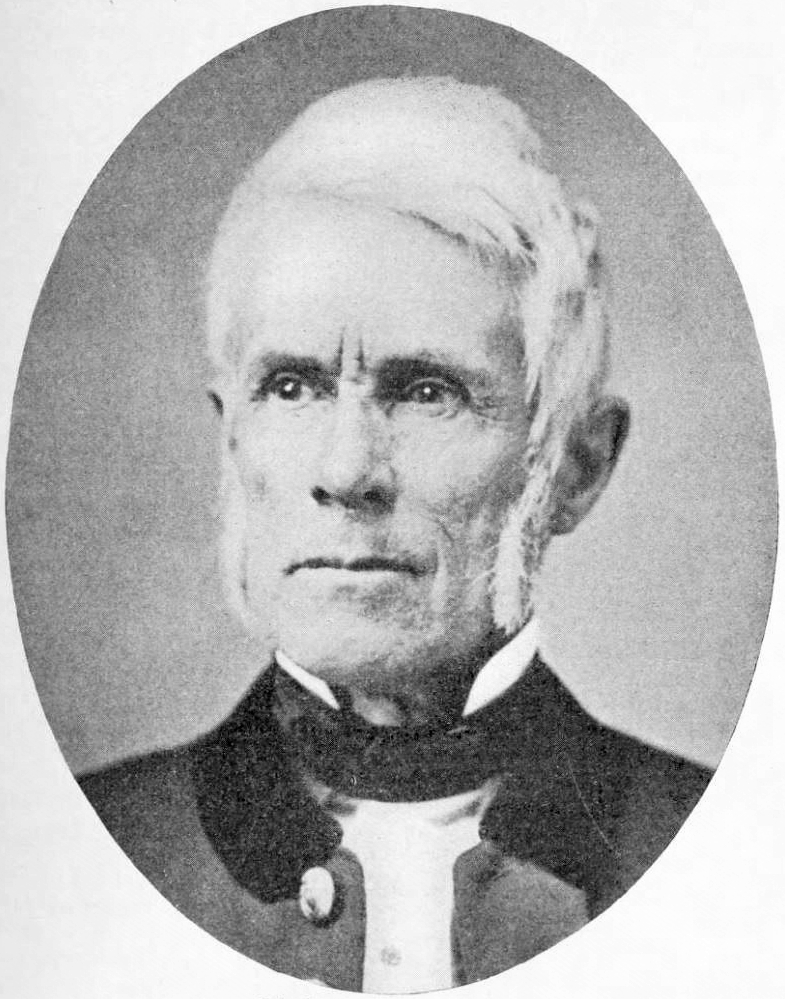
- Born: March 20, 1809; Thetford Center, Vermont, US
- Died: February 24, 1879 (aged 69); Northfield, Vermont, US
- Burial place: Elmwood Cemetery, Northfield, Vermont
- Spouse: Charlotte Sawyer
- Military career
- Allegiance: Union
- Branch: New Hampshire Militia; Vermont Militia
- Service years: 1847–1866
- Rank: Brigadier General
- Nickname: Old Jack
- Commands: Norwich University Corps of Cadets; 2nd Vermont Militia Regiment
- Conflicts: American Civil War: St. Albans Raid
- Other work: Professor, Norwich University

Alonzo Jackman (March 20, 1809 – February 24, 1879) was a Vermont educator and military officer. He is prominent for developing and implementing a system for receiving and training troops for the Union Army during the American Civil War, and for commanding troops on the Vermont border with Canada following the St. Albans Raid.

== Early life and academic career ==
Alonzo Jackman was born in Thetford Center, Vermont on March 20, 1809. He left home as a teenager following his widowed mother's remarriage, and worked as a laborer before deciding to obtain a college education. Entering Norwich University in 1832, he received his bachelor's degree in 1836 and his master's degree in 1840.

Jackman joined the Norwich University faculty as Professor of Mathematics, Natural Philosophy, Civil Engineering and Military Science. In addition, he served as the college's librarian.

Jackman wrote several articles and treatises on mathematics and other topics. In the 1840s he prepared an article on constructing an underwater telegraph, including methods of insulating and laying cable. When the Transatlantic line was laid in the 1850s and 1860s Jackman received credit for originating the idea.

In 1862 Jackman was awarded an honorary doctorate from Norwich University.

== Military service ==
In the 1830s and 1840s Jackman was part of a group of individuals interested in reorganizing and revitalizing the state militias, which had become increasingly dormant in the years following the War of 1812. This group, including Franklin Pierce, Alden Partridge, Truman B. Ransom, and Frederic Williams Hopkins, held seminars to discuss tactics, strategy and recruiting, and carry out maneuvers and drills in an effort to improve unit readiness.

From 1847 to 1848 he served as a Major and brigade drill master in the New Hampshire Militia. In 1859 he was commissioned as colonel of the 2nd Vermont Militia Regiment, and in 1860 he was appointed a brigadier general.

== Civil War service ==
At the start of the Civil War Governor Erastus Fairbanks offered him command of the 1st Vermont Infantry Regiment, but at the same time requested that Jackman decline it and stay in Vermont to train new recruits, and Jackman consented.

Working in concert with Adjutant General Peter T. Washburn, Jackman devised a process for receiving recruits at a central location, equipping them and training them before sending them to the front lines. This method was adopted by other states as they raised volunteer regiments throughout the Civil War.

Following the Confederate Raid on St. Albans, Vermont in October 1864, the northernmost action of the Civil War, General Jackman commanded troops along the Canada–US border.

== Death and burial ==
Jackman died suddenly at his home in Northfield, Vermont on February 24, 1879. Earlier that day he reported feeling ill and sent word to the university president that he would be unable to teach as scheduled. He died while wearing his uniform and standing at his living room window, falling to the floor after an apparent heart attack.

== Published works ==
- A treatise on the doctrine of numerical series, both ascending and descending (1846)
- Who Originated the Oceanic Telegraph? (1846)
- Mathematical Considerations (1873)
- The Circle Squared (1876)

== Legacy ==
Jackman Hall, the first building erected when the university moved from the town of Norwich to the town of Northfield after an 1866 fire, is named for him.

== Family ==
Jackman was married to Charlotte Sawyer of Royalton, Vermont (December 11, 1828 – October 7, 1874). They had two children, Alonzo (1857–1859) and Helen (1867–1877).
