= Charles C. P. Baldwin =

U.S. Marshal for Vermont

United States Marshal for the District of Vermont
- In office April 12, 1861 – July 25, 1865
- Preceded by: Lewis Samuel Partridge
- Succeeded by: Hugh H. Henry

Sheriff of Orange County, Vermont
- In office 1853–1858
- Preceded by: Daniel M. Richardson
- Succeeded by: Elisha Allis

Personal details
- Born: December 28, 1812 Bradford, Vermont, U.S.
- Died: October 28, 1893 (aged 80) Littleton, Iowa, U.S.
- Resting place: Littleton Cemetery, Littleton, Iowa
- Party: Whig (before 1855); Republican (from 1855)
- Spouse(s): Sarah Ann Woodward (m. 1835-1867, her death); Laura W. Kendrick (m. 1869-1893, his death)
- Children: 10
- Occupation: Farmer

Charles C. P. Baldwin (December 28, 1812- October 28, 1893) was a government official in Vermont. A Republican, prior to becoming a resident of Iowa in his later years, he served as Sheriff of Orange County, Vermont and United States Marshal for the District of Vermont.

== Biography ==
Charles C. P. Baldwin was born in Bradford, Vermont on December 28, 1812, a son of Benjamin Peters Baldwin (1767–1857) and Mehitable (Gordon) Baldwin (1774–1857). Baldwin was named for Charles Cotesworth Pinckney, and his name was often abbreviated as C. C. P. Baldwin or Chas. C. P. Baldwin. He was raised and educated in Bradford and became a farmer. Baldwin was also active in Bradford-area businesses, to include serving on the board of directors of the Vermont Copper Mining Company. Baldwin was also active in the Vermont Militia; when a company called the Bradford Guards formed in 1858, Baldwin was chosen as first lieutenant. He later served as sergeant major, quartermaster, and assistant adjutant of the 2nd Regiment, and then quartermaster of the 1st Brigade.

Originally a Whig and later a Republican, Baldwin served in local offices including town agent, town constable, and deputy sheriff of Orange County. In 1853, Baldwin was elected Orange County Sheriff, and he served until 1858.

In 1861, Baldwin was appointed United States Marshal for the District of Vermont, succeeding Lewis Samuel Partridge at the start of the American Civil War. Partridge was a Democrat, and in 1862 Baldwin detained Partridge and several others for alleged Confederate sympathies, and charged them with treason. They were accused of protesting by cutting down an American flag at a recruiting office and then using pistols to prevent soldiers from raising it again. Partridge initially traveled to Canada to escape arrest, but later appeared in Burlington to answer the charge and post bail. In 1864 he stood trial for obstructing the draft, and was acquitted.

Following the end of the war in 1865, Baldwin was succeeded as Marshal by Hugh H. Henry. After the death of his first wife, in 1867 Baldwin relocated to Jesup, Iowa, where he farmed and remained involved in politics as a Republican.

Baldwin died in Littleton, Iowa on October 28, 1893. He was buried at Littleton Cemetery in Littleton.

== Family ==
In 1835, Baldwin married Sarah Ann Woodward (1812–1867). In 1869, Baldwin married Laura W. Kendrick of Iowa. With his first wife, Baldwin was the father of 10 children, seven daughters and three sons. At the time of his death, five daughters and two sons were still living and resided in Iowa.

- Sarah Mehitable Baldwin Loy (1837–1899)
- Adelaide Lucy Baldwin (1839–1926)
- Mary Elizabeth Baldwin White (1841–1917)
- Jane H. Baldwin Miller (1844–1916)
- Charles Henry Baldwin (1844–1850)
- Helen B. Baldwin Gates (1846–1928)
- Almira Baldwin (1848–1850)
- James Whitelaw Baldwin (1850–1918)
- Susie Strickland Baldwin Hovey (1852–1886)
- Charles Baldwin (1857–1897)

== Sources ==
=== Internet ===
- "Vermont Vital Records, 1720-1908, Birth Entry for Charles Cotesworth Pinckney Baldwin". Ancestry.com. Lehi, UT: Ancestry.com, LLC. December 28, 1812.
- "Vermont Vital Records, 1720-1908, Marriage Entry for Charles C. P. Baldwin and Sarah Ann Woodward". Ancestry.com. Lehi, UT: Ancestry.com, LLC. 1835.
- "1860 United States Federal Census, Entry for Charles C. P. Baldwin". Ancestry.com. Lehi, UT: Ancestry.com, LLC. 1860.
- "Iowa Select Marriages Index, 1758-1996, Entry for Charles C. P. Baldwin and Laura W. Kendrick". Ancestry.com. Lehi, UT: Ancestry.com, LLC. 1869.
- "1870 United States Federal Census, Entry for Charles C. P. Baldwin". Ancestry.com. Lehi, UT: Ancestry.com, LLC. 1870.
- "Obituary, C. C. P. Baldwin (Unknown newspaper)". Ancestry.com. Lehi, UT: Ancestry.com, LLC. 1893.

=== Newspapers ===
- "Orange County Whig Convention". Vermont Watchman and State Journal. Montpelier, VT. July 4, 1842. p. 2 – via Newspapers.com.
- "Appointed a Deputy Sheriff". Vermont Family Gazette. Bradford, VT. April 23, 1851. p. 2 – via Newspapers.com.
- "Orange County Whig Nominees". Bradford Inquirer. Bradford, VT. July 9, 1853. p. 2 – via Newspapers.com.
- "Bradford Town Officers". Bradford Inquirer. Bradford, VT. March 25, 1854. p. 2 – via Newspapers.com.
- "Orange Co. Officers, 1854-55". Bradford Inquirer. Bradford, VT. December 23, 1854. p. 2 – via Newspapers.com.
- "Bradford Town Meeting". Aurora of the Valley. Newbury, VT. March 15, 1856. p. 2 – via Newspapers.com.
- "Bradford Guards". Vermont Journal. Windsor, VT. November 27, 1858. p. 3 – via Newspapers.com.
- "The Commissioned Officers of the Second Regiment". Vermont Patriot and State Gazette. Montpelier, VT. April 16, 1859. p. 4 – via Newspapers.com.
- "Orange County Republican Convention". Hartland News. Hartland, VT. July 30, 1859. p. 3 – via Newspapers.com.
- "The Muster at Bradford". North Star. Danville, VT. September 17, 1859. p. 2 – via Newspapers.com.
- "First Muster of the Second Regiment". Aurora of the Valley. Newbury, VT. September 17, 1859. p. 2 – via Newspapers.com.
- "List of Commissions". Rutland Herald. Rutland, VT. May 10, 1860. p. 2 – via Newspapers.com.
- "Republican District Convention". Vermont Watchman and State Journal. Montpelier, VT. August 10, 1860. p. 2 – via Newspapers.com.
- "Appointment of U.S. Marshal". Vermont Journal. Windsor, VT. March 30, 1861. p. 8 – via Newspapers.com.
- "The Case of Marshal Partridge". The New York Times. New York, NY. July 29, 1862. p. 8 – via TimesMachine.
- "Ex-Marshal Partridge". Rutland Herald. Rutland, VT. August 25, 1862. p. 2 – via Newspapers.com.
- "Acquittal of Gen. Partridge". Burlington Daily Times. Burlington, VT. August 13, 1864. p. 1 – via Newspapers.com.
- "Appointments: H. H. Henry". Burlington Weekly Sentinel. Burlington, VT. August 11, 1865. p. 3 – via Newspapers.com.
- "Orange County: C. C. P. Baldwin". Vermont Christian Messenger. Montpelier, VT. September 26, 1867. p. 3 – via Newspapers.com.
- "Republican County Convention". The Bulletin-Journal. Independence, IA. August 31, 1877. p. 3 – via Newspapers.com.

=== Books ===
- Bassett, Thomas D. Seymour (1992). The Growing Edge: Vermont Villages, 1840-1880. Montpelier, VT: Vermont Historical Society. p. 142. ISBN 978-0-9347-2036-6 – via Google Books. "Baldwin charged Lewis S. Partridge of Norwich with treason for cutting down an American flag and brandishing pistols when soldiers came to raise it again. Two years later Partridge was tried for draft obstruction and acquitted."
- Child, Hamilton (1888). Gazetteer of Orange County, Vt., 1762-1888. Syracuse, NY: Syracuse Journal Company. p. 18 – via Internet Archive.
