= Alden Partridge =

American military officer and educator (1785–1854)

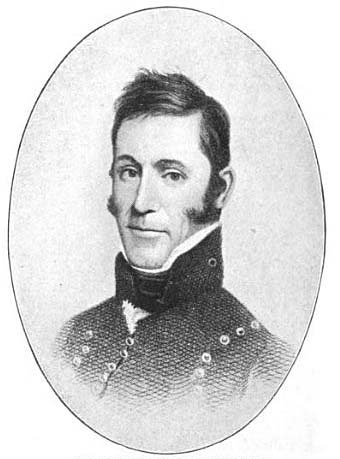
- Partridge, c. 1817

Member of the Vermont House of Representatives from Norwich
- In office 1833–1835
- Preceded by: Elias Lyman Jr.
- Succeeded by: Cyrus Partridge
- In office 1837–1838
- Preceded by: Cyrus Partridge
- Succeeded by: Thomas Hazen
- In office 1839–1840
- Preceded by: Thomas Hazen
- Succeeded by: Aaron Loveland

Vermont Surveyor General
- In office 1822–1823
- Preceded by: Joseph Beeman
- Succeeded by: Calvin C. Waller

President of Norwich University
- In office 1819–1844
- Preceded by: None (University founded)
- Succeeded by: Truman B. Ransom

Superintendent of the United States Military Academy
- In office 1814–1817
- Preceded by: Joseph Gardner Swift
- Succeeded by: Sylvanus Thayer

Personal details
- Born: February 12, 1785 Norwich, State of Vermont
- Died: January 17, 1854 (aged 68) Norwich, Vermont, US
- Resting place: Fairview Cemetery, Norwich, Vermont
- Spouse: Ann Swasey (m. 1837, 1854, his death)
- Relations: Lewis Samuel Partridge (nephew)
- Children: 2
- Nickname: "Old Pewt"

Military service
- Allegiance: United States of America
- Branch/service: United States Army
- Years of service: 1805–1817
- Rank: Captain
- Unit: Corps of Engineers
- Commands: USMA Superintendent
- Battles/wars: War of 1812

Alden Partridge (February 12, 1785 – January 17, 1854) (Note: Some sources, including the Norwich, Vermont town records, give Partridge's birth month as January. His grave marker and the biographical sketch of Partridge in William Arba Ellis's history of Norwich University indicate that he was born in February.) was an American author, legislator, officer, surveyor, an early superintendent of the United States Military Academy at West Point, New York and a controversial pioneer in U.S. military education, emphasizing physical fitness training, advocating the concept of citizen soldier and establishing a series of private military academies throughout the country, including Norwich University.

== Early life ==
Alden Partridge was born and raised on a family farm in Norwich, Vermont, the son of Elizabeth (Wright) Partridge and soldier Samuel Partridge Jr., who had fought in the American Revolutionary War, including the Battles of Saratoga. Tall and hardy, the younger Partridge hiked the Green and White Mountains, worked on his father's farm, and matriculated in local district schools. He attended Dartmouth College from 1802 to 1805.

== Military career ==
Upon his graduation from the United States Military Academy at West Point, New York in 1806, Partridge received the rank of lieutenant of engineers and an appointment at the academy as an assistant professor of mathematics. In its early days, the post served both as the academy for training prospective officers and the headquarters of the United States Army Corps of Engineers, and the superintendent was also chief of engineers. In 1808 chief engineer Jonathan Williams promoted Partridge to professor of mathematics and delegated to him the responsibilities of acting superintendent. Partridge set an example for physical fitness during his administration, frequently leading the cadet corps on extended marches in New York and neighboring states. Never profane or intemperate, superintendent Partridge required cadets to attend church services, occasionally preparing and delivering the sermon on Sundays. Named professor of engineers in 1813, and officially appointed as superintendent in 1814, "Old Pewt" developed a reputation among academy faculty as a martinet, often micromanaging subordinates, and occasionally demonstrating preference toward favorite cadets.

The "Long Gray Line" tradition at West Point originated during Partridge's tenure when he had gray uniforms made in New York City in 1814 because of a shortage of blue cloth. In 1816, when the War Department decided to select a new Cadet uniform, gray was chosen because "it better suits the finance of the Cadets than one of blue." In other words, gray uniforms were cheaper.

Partridge refused to relinquish his command when former student (but superior officer) Sylvanus Thayer was appointed to replace him as superintendent; Partridge was court-martialed for insubordination and neglect of duty. Though acquitted of serious wrongdoing, he chose to resign his commission in 1818, after having served his entire Army career at the academy. He received a pension for his service at West Point during the War of 1812, and after his death his wife received a pension as the widow of an 1812 veteran.

== Citizen soldier ==
In the summer of 1818 Partridge was engaged in New York City to drill and instruct a volunteer infantry company, and he gave a series of lectures on the subjects of military science, fortifications, and military education. In these lectures, Partridge advocated a new program of regional military instruction and began a lifelong campaign in opposition to the existing national military academy system which would shape the rest of his life. Partridge argued that the national academies produced a professional officer class, and was creating a new military elite, which was at odds with examples of the country's great generals, such as George Washington and Andrew Jackson. Partridge proposed the nation be divided into state-based military departments, local citizen soldiers organized into militias and officers appointed by department, and units mustered on a regular basis for instruction and drill, much like the Minutemen of the well-remembered American Revolution. Further, he suggested military colleges for officer instruction be established in each department.

Partridge was appointed chief of the surveying expedition to establish boundaries between the U.S. and Canada as required under the Treaty of Ghent. He mapped the natural watersheds of the Saint Lawrence River and Hudson River. Still consumed with plans for a military college based on his program, he decided to resign from the expedition in 1820, and retired to Norwich.

== Private military educator ==
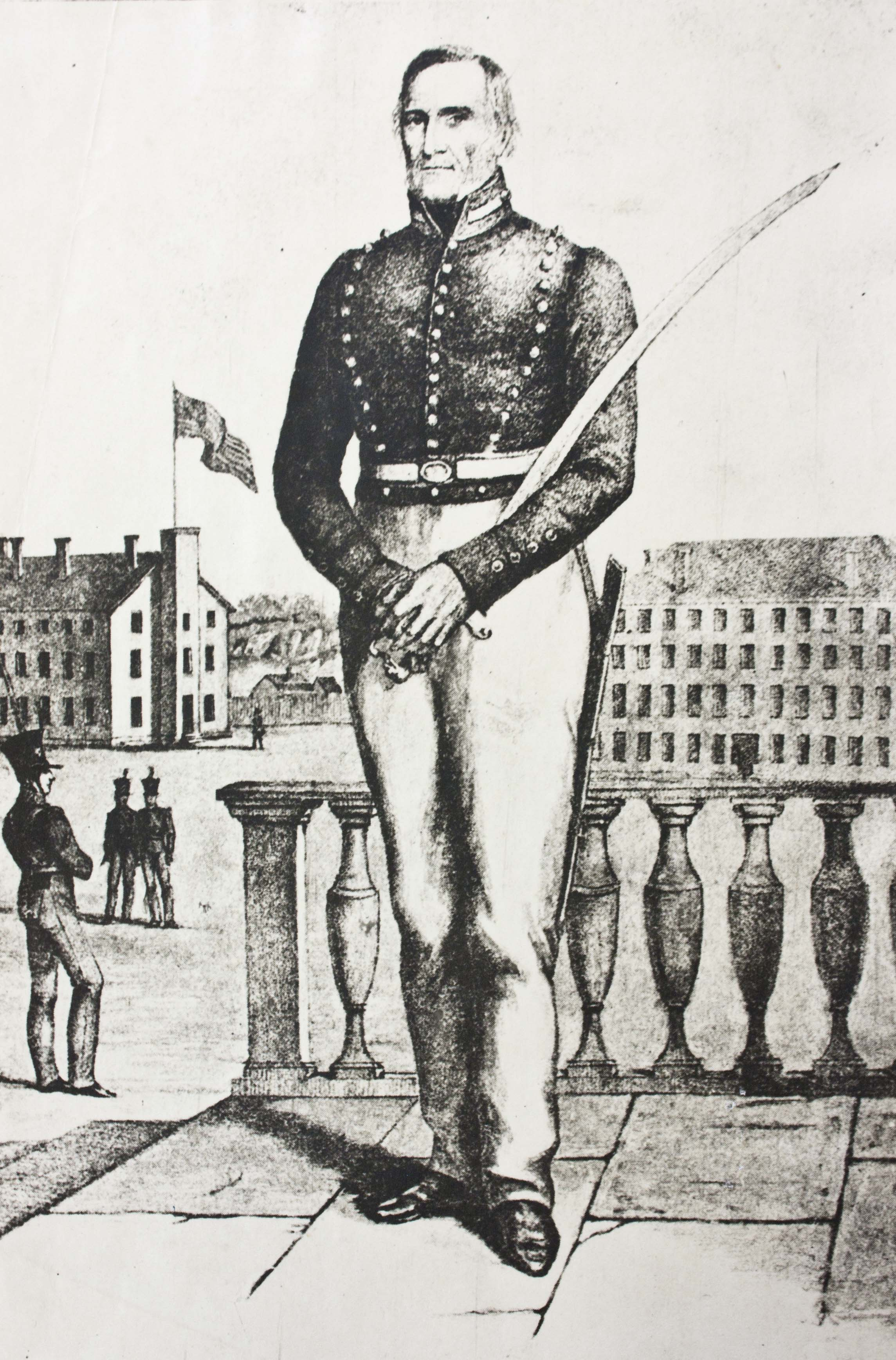
Alden Partridge with cadets at a military academy. From an 1840 engraving, courtesy of the Norwich Historical Society

=== Norwich University ===
In 1819, Partridge founded in Norwich, Vermont the "American Literary, Scientific, and Military Academy", now known as Norwich University. Norwich is the nation's oldest private military college, based on Partridge's model of training citizen soldiers, it became the basis for the Reserve Officers' Training Corps (ROTC). In its first four years, the nascent academy was attended by 480 students representing 21 of the 24 states, and Partridge's program seemed successful enough to attract the attention of Middletown, Connecticut, which undertook a financial subscription of local residents as an inducement to relocate his academy. Partridge moved the school, and in Middletown, it drew nearly 1,200 students in three years, but the academy was operating again in Norwich by 1829.

=== Curriculum ===
The curriculum Partridge advanced incorporated the study of liberal arts, agriculture, modern languages, and engineering in addition to the sciences and various military subjects. Field exercises and drills, for which Partridge borrowed cannon and muskets from the federal and state governments, supplemented classroom instruction and added an element of realism to the college's program of well-rounded military education.

One of America's first exercise enthusiasts, Partridge became a strong proponent of physical education as an essential part of school curriculum. As part of that program, he often led his classes on hiking expeditions in the many local mountains of New England. On one climb of Vermont's Green Mountains in 1822, Partridge led 27 pack-laden cadets on a 150-mile hike from Norwich to Manchester in just four days.

=== Other colleges ===
Awarded an honorary master's degree from Dartmouth in 1812, Partridge received the same honor from the University of Vermont in 1821, but he declined that institution's offer the same year to become its president.

Partridge founded 17 military institutions during his quest to reform the fledgling United States military, including: The American Literary, Scientific, and Military Academy at Middletown, Connecticut (1824–1831), the Virginia Literary, Scientific and Military Academy at Portsmouth (1839–1846), Pennsylvania Literary, Scientific, and Military Academy at Bristol (1842–1845), Pennsylvania Military Institute at Harrisburg (1845–1848), Wilmington Literary, Scientific and Military Academy at Wilmington (1846–1848), the Scientific and Military Collegiate Institute at Reading, Pennsylvania (1850–1854), Gymnasium and Military Institute at Pembroke, New Hampshire (1850–1853) the National Scientific and Military Academy at Brandywine Springs, Delaware (1853).

When John Thomas Lewis Preston worked to influence public opinion in favor of creating the Virginia Military Institute in the 1830s, Partridge assisted by providing open letters of support to members of the Virginia General Assembly and letters to the editors of Virginia newspapers.

== Efforts to revitalize militia ==
Interested in revitalizing and reforming the state militias, which had become increasingly dormant during the long period of peace following the War of 1812, Partridge and Norwich University faculty members Truman B. Ransom and Alonzo Jackman, both of whom served in the militia, worked with Franklin Pierce of New Hampshire, also a militia officer, and Frederic Williams Hopkins of the Vermont militia on efforts to increase recruiting and improve training and readiness.

== Personal life ==
An avid hiker, Partridge is described as "a noted pedestrian" in A History of Norwich. He had reportedly already ascended Mount Monadnock and Mount Moosilauke in New Hampshire when in 1818 he walked 76 miles from Norwich to climb both Camel's Hump and Mount Mansfield in two days. It rained the entire journey, according to his journal, and while one friend joined him climbing Mansfield, he hiked the balance of the expedition accompanied only by his "inseparable companions", his knapsack and barometer. He was an early traveler on a path to the summit of Mount Washington, New Hampshire that had been constructed in 1821 by the pioneering Ethan Crawford.

A Democrat, Partridge served as Vermont's Surveyor General from 1822 to 1823. He also served four terms in the Vermont House of Representatives, (1833, 1834, 1837 and 1839). In addition, he ran unsuccessfully for the United States House of Representatives on five occasions between 1834 and 1840, losing each time to Whig party candidate Horace Everett.

== Family ==
In 1837, Partridge married Ann Swasey (1810–1902), with whom he had two sons, George M. C. Partridge (1838–1855) and Henry V. Partridge (1839–1920). His widow did not remarry, and survived him by 48 years.

In 1823 Partridge adopted a young Greek boy, George Colvocoresses, whom he raised and educated at Norwich University. Colvocoresses, NU Class of 1831, was appointed to the United States Navy in 1832; from 1838 to 1842 he served in the United States Exploring Expedition, better known as the Wilkes Expedition of the Pacific Ocean. Three separate geographical features, two on the west coast of the U.S. and another in Antarctica, were named for Colvocoresses.

== Death ==
Partridge died in Norwich on January 17, 1854. He was buried at Fairview Cemetery in Norwich.

== Works ==
Partridge wrote widely, mostly in local newspapers and in books, about his many travels, several mathematical and scientific subjects, and his constant, vocal opposition to the academy at West Point. The following is an incomplete list of his writings.

- "Observations Relative to the Calculation of the Altitude of Mountains, etc, by the Use of the Barometer" (1812)
- "Method of Determining the Initial Velocity of Projectiles" (1812)
- "Account of Some Experiments on Fire of Artillery and Infantry at the Military Academy in 1810 and 1814"
- "Newton's Binomial Theorem" (1814)
- "Meteorological Tables" (1810–1814)
- "A General Plan for the Establishment of Military Academies" (1815)
- "Reports of the National Academy" (1814–1817)
- "Lectures on National Defense" (1821–1827)
- "Discourse on education" 1826. The art of epistolary composition, or Models of letters, billets, bills of exchange ... with preliminary instructions and notes : to which are added, a collection of fables ... for pupils learning the French language; a series of letters between a cadet and his father, describing the system pursued at the American, literary, scientific and military academy at Middletown, Conn.: E. & H. Clark, 1826. PE1481 .P4
- The Military Academy, at West Point, unmasked: or, corruption and military despotism exposed. By Americanus [pseud.], Washington [D.C.], Sold at the bookstore of J. Elliot, 1830, [3], 4-28 p. 22 cm. Attributed to Alden Partridge by Sidney Forman in his West Point. A History of the United States Military Academy (New York, 1950), p. 62. USMA: U410.F7 P258 .

Military offices
Preceded by Joseph Gardner Swift	Superintendent of the United States Military Academy; 1814–1817	Succeeded by Sylvanus Thayer
