= Vermont Valley Railroad =

American former railway line

Map

The Vermont Valley Railroad (reporting mark VV) was a 20.8-mile (33.5 km) line in Vermont and New Hampshire, running from Brattleboro to the Vermont-New Hampshire line at Windsor, now part of the Connecticut River Line. Hugh H. Henry (1814-1869) of Chester, Vermont was an original incorporator, and was chosen as its first president. He served from 1848 until his death. In New Hampshire, the line was operated as the Sullivan County Railroad. The line was eventually owned by the Connecticut River Railroad, who in turn leased the line to the Boston and Maine.

In 1988, the Interstate Commerce Commission ordered the Boston and Maine (B & M) to sell it to Amtrak, with trackage rights staying with the B & M. Amtrak was allowed to sell it to the Central Vermont Railway, part of the Canadian National Railway. The CV obtained the line on September 9. The sale was made because the track condition was not suitable for running Amtrak's Montrealer passenger trains, and Amtrak had to discontinue service on April 5, 1987. Service resumed in July 1989 after Amtrak paid the CV to upgrade the line.

The companies were unable to agree on a permanent trackage rights agreement, and in 1990, the ICC imposed terms, in which the B&M could serve all "existing shippers and shippers' facilities" located on the line and in operation during the 12 months prior to the sale to the CV. The New England Central Railroad acquired the line from the CV in 1994, and the Springfield Terminal Railway has since acquired the trackage rights assigned to the B&M.
