= George Bradley Kellogg =

American politician and military figure (1826-1875)

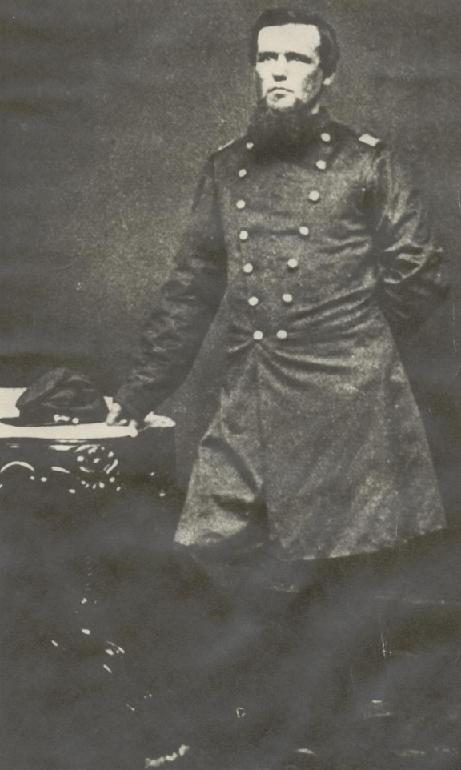
George Bradley Kellogg, Adjutant General of the Vermont National Guard

George Bradley Kellogg (November 6, 1826 – November 12, 1875) was a Vermont military and political figure who served as Adjutant General of the Vermont Militia and a Lieutenant Colonel in the 1st Vermont Cavalry during the American Civil War.

== Early life ==
George B. Kellogg was born in Rockingham, Vermont on November 6, 1825, the son of Jane (McAfee) Kellogg and Vermont Adjutant General and Judge Daniel Kellogg. He studied law, was admitted to the bar, and practiced in Brattleboro.

Kellogg served in local offices, including Justice of the Peace. He also served as Windham County State's Attorney and a member of the Vermont House of Representatives.

He was Vermont's Adjutant General from 1854 to 1859.

In 1861 Kellogg was appointed Brattleboro's Deputy Postmaster.

== Civil War ==
At the start of the Civil War Kellogg accepted a commission to recruit troops for the volunteer regiments of the Union Army. He helped raised the 1st Vermont Cavalry Regiment and was appointed Lieutenant Colonel and second in command. Kellogg was the regiment's de facto commander and took part in several battles, but was unhappy at not receiving promotion to Colonel and command of the regiment after the resignation of Lemuel Platt, its first commander, and the death of Jonas P. Holliday, who had succeeded Platt. As a result he left the regiment, and was discharged in 1862.

== Later life ==
After leaving the Army, Kellogg moved to St. Louis, where he reestablished his law practice. Later in the Civil War he was appointed a Major in the Missouri Militia and assigned to a unit ordered to perform home guard duties in and around St. Louis.

In March 1867 President Andrew Johnson nominated Kellogg to be United States Attorney for the Eastern District of Missouri, but he was not confirmed by the United States Senate.

== Death and burial ==
George B. Kellogg died in St. Louis on November 12, 1875. He was originally interred at Holy Trinity Cemetery, and the remains at that site were later moved to Calvary Cemetery.

== Family ==
Kellogg married Mary Lee Sikes (October 10, 1826—January 16, 1907) on March 15, 1847. They had two daughters – Jane McAfee Kellogg (b. September 23, 1849), and Sarah Bradley Kellogg (b. January 6, 1853).

Military offices
Preceded by Lewis Samuel Partridge	Vermont Adjutant General; 1854–1859	Succeeded by Horace Henry Baxter
