= Brandywine Springs =

Coordinates: 39.7446°N 75.6391°W

Brandywine Springs is a historic area near Newport, Delaware, along the Red Clay Creek.

It is noted from early American history as a Revolutionary War encampment of General George Washington's army.

In 1826, a large four-storey resort hotel was built in Brandywine Springs. "The resort became an attraction for many persons of distinction and elegance both in national life and in society," wrote one early 20th-century history of the Newark area. Visitors included John Quincy Adams, Henry Clay, and Daniel Webster. The hotel and its grounds were purchased in 1832 by Matthew Newkirk, a wealthy Philadelphia merchant who owned a vacation cottage nearby. Newkirk spent considerable sums to improve the hotel and grounds. But by 1850 the hotel was failing. It was soon leased to Captain Alden Partridge, who opened the National Scientific and Military Academy there. But the school building was destroyed by fire shortly after opening and the school closed.

In the 1880s, it became known once again as a resort area, this time for its mineral springs and luxurious hotel resort.

In the early 20th century, it became renowned for an amusement park built along the Hyde Run tributary. This park offered rides as well as both live performances and an early movie theater at what was known as the "Roof Garden Theater", which operated from 1899 to 1916. The amusement park closed down following the 1923 season after years of declining attendance. The Friends of Brandywine Springs are dedicated to recovering the history of the amusement park. Early films of the park from circa 1903 are some of the earliest motion picture images of Delaware.

In 1956 state senator Fredrick Klair procured the land for the state and established Brandywine Springs State Park. In 1970, Brandywine Springs was converted from a state park to a county park operated by New Castle County as the legislature felt it better met local needs as opposed to state needs, and there had been no county-level parks department at the time it was created as a state park.
