= Norwich University =

Military college in Northfield, Vermont, US

Coordinates: 44°08′20″N 72°39′36″W

- Former names: American Literary, Scientific and Military Academy
- Motto: Essayons
- Motto in English: I Will Try
- Type: Private senior military college
- Established: August 6, 1819; 207 years ago
- Endowment: $218 million
- President: Lt Gen. John Broadmeadow, USMC, Ret.
- Faculty: 347 (fall 2023)
- Students: 3,274 (fall 2023)
- Undergraduates: 2,642 (fall 2023)
- Postgraduates: 632 (fall 2023)
- Location: Northfield, Vermont, U.S.
- Campus: Rural, 1,200 acres (490 ha)
- Colors: Maroon & gold
- Sporting affiliations: NCAA Division III; Great Northeast Athletic Conference, Little East
- Mascot: Alden Partridge
- Website: norwich.edu

Norwich University is a private university in Northfield, Vermont, United States. The university was founded in 1819 as the "American Literary, Scientific and Military Academy". It is the oldest of six senior military colleges and is recognized by the United States Department of Defense as the "Birthplace of ROTC".

Academics at Norwich University are organized through several academic colleges, including the College of Arts and Sciences, the College of National Services, the College of Professional Schools, and the College of Graduate and Continuing Studies. Students may enroll either as members of the Corps of Cadets or as civilian students, but both groups pursue the same academic programs and degrees. The College of Graduate and Continuing Studies primarily serves adult and online learners, offering flexible undergraduate and graduate programs. Norwich’s Reserve Officers' Training Corps programs—Army, Navy/Marine Corps, and Air Force/Space Force—provide pathways to commissioning, while students interested in the United States Coast Guard may participate in the Coast Guard Auxiliary University Program.

Norwich alumni have included over 138 flag officers in the U.S. Armed Forces, 26 generals in foreign armed forces (namely Thailand and the Republic of China), 6 state governors, 3 chief justices of a state supreme court, 1 U.S. Secretary of the Navy (Gideon Welles), and 10 Medal of Honor recipients.

== History ==
=== Founding ===
The university was founded in 1819 in Norwich, Vermont, by Captain Alden Partridge, military educator and former superintendent of West Point. Partridge believed in the "American System of Education," a traditional liberal arts curriculum with instruction in civil engineering and military science. After leaving West Point because of congressional disapproval of his system, he returned to his native state of Vermont to create the American Literary, Scientific and Military Academy. Partridge, in founding the academy, rebelled against the reforms of Sylvanus Thayer to prevent the rise of what he saw as the greatest threat to the security of the young republic: an aristocratic and careerist officer class.

He believed that a well-trained militia was an urgent necessity and developed the American system around that idea. His academy inspired several military colleges throughout the nation, including The Citadel. It also was a model for the land grant colleges created through the Morrill Act of 1862. Today, Norwich offers substantial online distance graduate programs. It is similar in many regards to The Citadel in mission, online offerings, student body composition, and size.

Partridge founded 16 other military institutions during his quest to reform the fledgling United States military, including the Virginia Literary, Scientific and Military Academy at Portsmouth, Virginia (1839–1846); Pennsylvania Literary, Scientific, and Military Academy at Bristol, Pennsylvania (1842–1845); Pennsylvania Military Institute at Harrisburg, Pennsylvania (1845–1848); Wilmington Literary, Scientific and Military Academy at Wilmington, Delaware (1846–1848); the Scientific and Military Collegiate Institute at Reading, Pennsylvania (1850–1854); Gymnasium and Military Institute at Pembroke, New Hampshire (1850–1853); and the National Scientific and Military Academy at Brandywine Springs, Delaware (1853).

=== 19th century ===
In 1825, the academy moved to Middletown, Connecticut, in an attempt by Captain Partridge to earn the forthcoming U.S. Naval Academy contract. Beginning in 1826, the academy offered the first program of courses in civil engineering in the US.

In 1829, the state of Connecticut declined to grant Captain Partridge a charter, and he moved the school back to Norwich, the Middletown campus becoming Wesleyan College. In 1834, Vermont granted a charter to Partridge and recognized his institution as Norwich University.

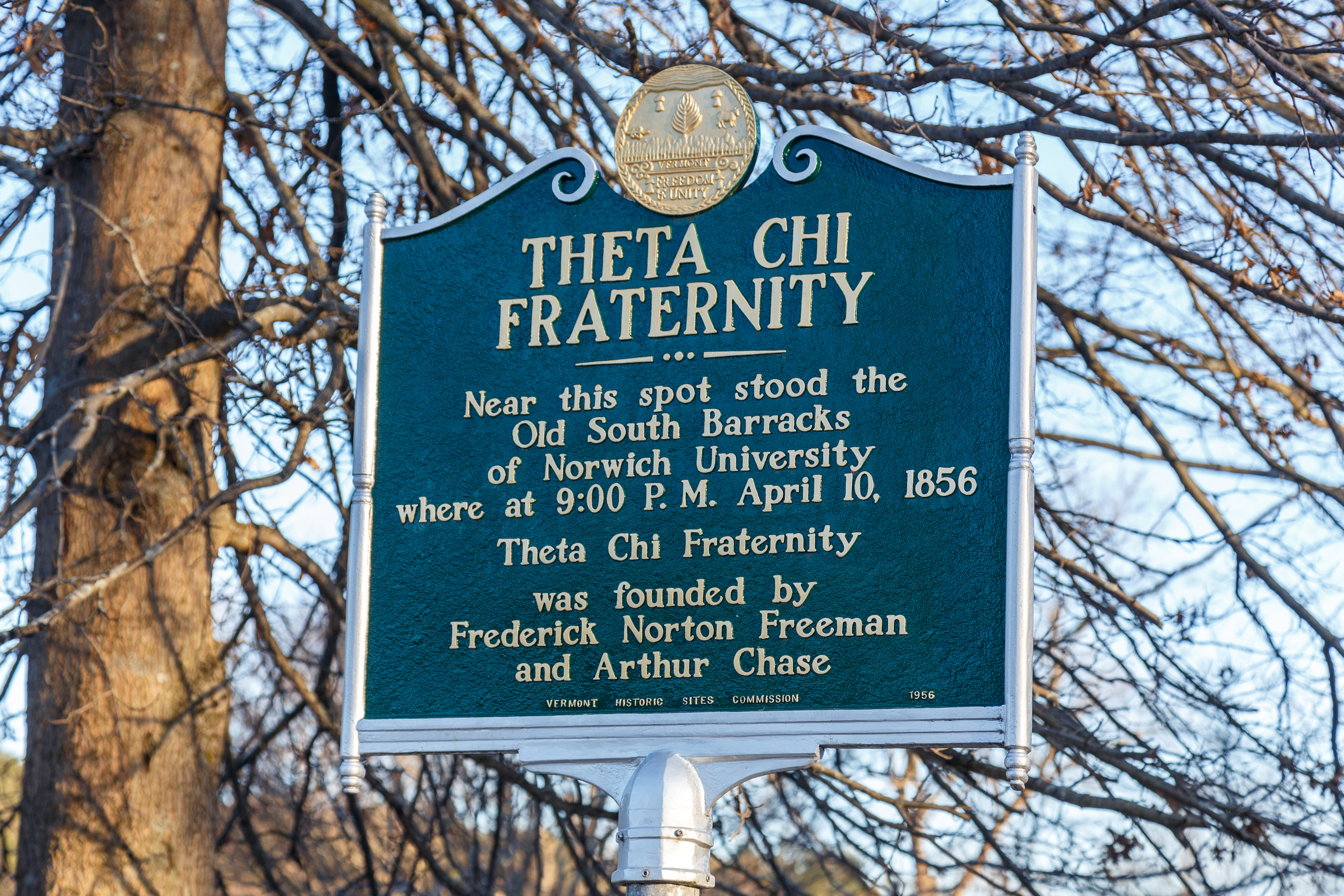
Historical sign in Norwich

During the 1856 academic year, the first chapter of the Theta Chi fraternity was founded by cadets Frederick Norton Freeman and Arthur Chase. With the beginning of the Civil War in 1861, Norwich cadets served as instructors of state militias throughout the Northeast. Support for the Union cause was strong at Norwich; the entire class of 1862 enlisted in the United States Military upon its graduation.

Norwich turned out hundreds of officers and soldiers who served with the federal armies in the American Civil War, including four recipients of the Medal of Honor. One graduate led a corps, seven more headed divisions, 21 commanded brigades, 38 led regiments, and various alumni served in 131 different regimental organizations. In addition, these men were eyewitnesses to some of the war's most dramatic events, including the bloodiest day of the conflict at Antietam, the attack up Marye's Heights at Fredericksburg, and the repulse of Pickett's Charge at Gettysburg. Seven hundred and fifty Norwich men served in the Civil War, of whom an estimated fifty-six fought for the Confederacy. Because of the university's high rate of participation in the war, the number of students dwindled: only seven were in the Class of 1864.

The Confederate raid on St. Albans, Vermont, precipitated fear that Newport, Vermont, was an imminent target. The Corps of Cadets quickly boarded an express train for Newport the same day, October 19, 1864, and were greeted with great relief by residents when they arrived.

After a catastrophic fire in 1866, which devastated the Old South Barracks and the entire military academy, the town of Northfield welcomed the struggling school. The Civil War, the fire, and uncertainty whether the university would continue adversely affected continuing students and new admissions. The school opened in the fall of 1866 with only 19 students. During the 1870s and 1880s, the institution struggled financially, affected by national economic crises. It was renamed Lewis College in 1880. In 1881, the student body consisted of only a dozen men.

By 1884, the Vermont Legislature changed the name of the school back to Norwich. In the 1890s, the United States Army and Norwich expanded their collaboration. Career officer Jesse McI. Carter received a two-year appointment as an instructor and Commandant of Cadets. In 1898 the university was designated by the legislature as the Military College of the State of Vermont.

=== 20th century ===
1916 was a momentous year for the school. The academic year was disrupted when the school's Corps of Cadets was mobilized as a squadron of cavalry in the Vermont National Guard's First Vermont Regiment to help with General John J. Pershing's Mexican Expedition on the southern border. As well, the War Department designated Norwich as the first site for a Senior ROTC cavalry unit. And the school's first African American student arrived: Harold "Doc" Martin.

Classes graduated early during both the First and Second World Wars. Many Norwich-made officers participated, serving in all theaters of both conflicts. Professional education offered at Norwich changed and adapted with the advance of technology. Military flight training began in 1939.

Graduates returning from European and Pacific fields of battle after World War II found a university very different from the one they had left. In 1947, the Army Department created a new program uniquely suited to Vermont's harsh climate: a mountain and cold weather warfare unit. An Air Force ROTC program was established in 1972; a Navy one in 1984. During the 1974 school year, the university first admitted women into the Corps of Cadets, two years before the federal service academies. The 1972 merger and 1993 integration with Vermont College added women and civilian students to "the Hill" .

==== Hazing ====
In the nineteenth century, hazing of undergraduates by upperclassmen was common in all military schools and many non-military ones as well. Hazing diminished in the early 20th century. By the late 20th century, it was prohibited by university rules and illegal by state law. Despite these changes, there were several reported instances of hazing in 1990, 1995, and 2022.

=== 21st century ===
In 2001, Norwich sold its Vermont College campus and non-traditional degree programs to the Union Institute and University. In 2008 Vermont College's arts programs were spun off to establish the independent Vermont College of Fine Arts.

In 2009, the Provisional Artillery Company was deactivated.

== Campus ==
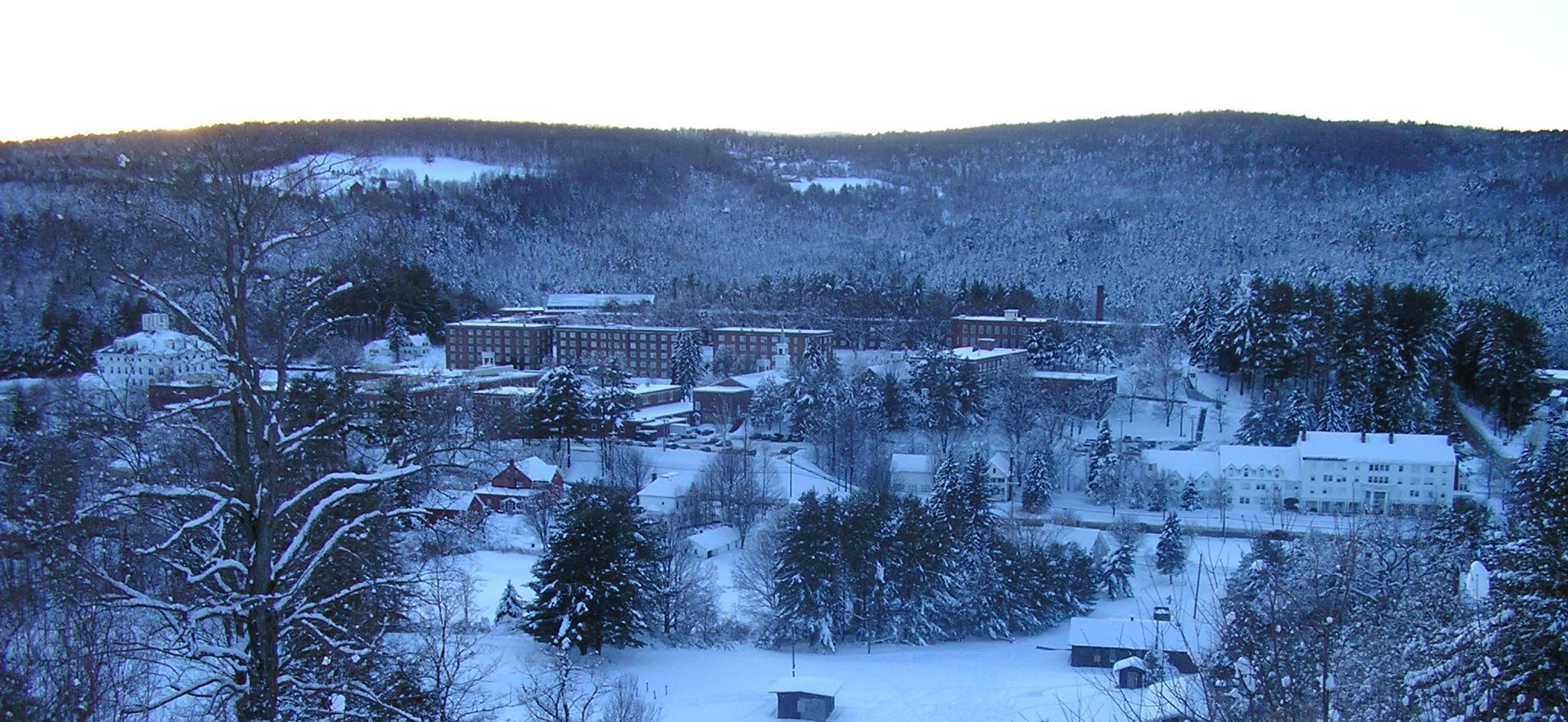
Winter at Norwich University campus in Northfield

=== Academic buildings ===
==== Ainsworth Hall ====
In 1910 Ainsworth Hall was constructed for the United States Weather Bureau as its central Vermont station. Returned to the university in 1948, it served as the administrative headquarters of the campus. By 1955,the growth of the university forced the relocation of the administration to Dewey Hall. When construction began on Webb Hall that year to the immediate west of Ainsworth Hall, the infirmary moved into the now-empty structure. As the university expanded in the 1960s and 1970s, the Hall was adapted for use by the Division of Social Sciences. The building is named for Mrs. Laura Ainsworth, widow of Captain James E. Ainsworth (NU 1853). In 1915 he worked to bring an infirmary to campus.

==== Chaplin Hall ====
Chaplin Hall, originally Carnegie Hall, was built in 1907. The School of Architecture + Art is located there. Paid for by Andrew Carnegie, the building served as the university's library until 1993 with the construction of the Kreitzberg Library. When the library was renovated in 1952, from the contributions of trustee Henry P. Chaplin, it was rededicated as the Henry Prescott Chaplin Memorial Library. Until 1941 and the addition of Partridge Hall to the growing campus, Chaplin Hall also provided the classrooms and offices for the Department of Electrical Engineering.

==== Communications Building ====
This building, on the site of the first building in Northfield Center, contains the offices and classrooms of the Communications Department. The offices for the school newspaper The Guidon and the studios for the university's radio station WNUB-FM are also located in this building. The building was purchased by the university in 1973 and restored in 1988.

==== Dewey Hall ====
Named for Admiral of the Navy George Dewey (NU 1852–1854), and completed in 1902, Dewey Hall is one of the oldest buildings on the Northfield campus. It was originally four stories high with the lower floor occupied by offices of the university's administration, the library, and museum. Office space for trustees and faculty, a chapel with a seating of five hundred, and the United States Weather Bureau were located on the fourth floor. With the departure of the Weather Bureau in 1909 and the completion of the then-new Carnegie Library in 1907, the Hall was primarily used by the Military Department. In October 1925 a fire gutted the building which led to its reconstruction as a three-story structure.

==== Hollis House ====
Hollis House is today the location of several classrooms and offices of the College of Liberal Arts. Built in 1852, the building was until 1909 the house of several prominent residents of Northfield. When sold that year to the university, it became part of the US Weather Bureau's station collocated on campus. The building was later named for David B. "Dixie" Hollis (NU 1922) who upon his death in 1993 gave what was then the largest donation in the university's history: $7 million.

==== Engineering, Math and Science Complex ====
The Engineering, Math, and Science Complex houses the David Crawford School of Engineering as well as the departments of Geology, Chemistry, Physics, Biology, Mathematics, and Sports Medicine. An addition of Nursing was completed in 2011. The complex (known as the "U" building) is composed of six sections: Juckett, Partridge, and Tompkins Halls, the Science Building, Bartolleto Hall, and the Cabot Annex. The complex was completed in 1997 and replaced a previous set of 1940s- and 1950s-era facilities. The Engineering, Math, and Science Complex also contains the university's Information Technology Services office.

==== Kreitzberg Library ====
Kreitzberg Library is named in recognition of Barbara and Chairman of the Board of Trustees Fred Kreitzberg (NU 1957). The library has a catalog of more than 240,000 books, about 45,000 electronic journals, and a collection of federal government publications. The Norwich University Archives and Special Collections has rare books and unique source materials relating to military history, the history of Vermont, and the history of the university. The 58,000-square-foot (5,400 m^{2}) library was designed by Perry Dean Rogers Architects. It was completed in 1993 for $8.1 million. In 2015, a renovation project brought the library into the twenty-first century with enhancements including new workstations, group-study and collaborative-learning areas, new technology-enabled classrooms, and a café. Additional improvements include two new conference rooms, a 77 percent increase in the number of seats, and an increase in data speeds.

==== Schneider Hall ====
Originally Webb Hall, it was completed in 1960 and originally housed the English, Modern Languages, Social Sciences, Business Administration, and the Psychology and Education departments. Dole Auditorium, which seated over four hundred people, was located in Webb Hall. The building is named after J. Watson Webb, a Norwich trustee. The auditorium honored Charles Dole (NU 1869), who served in his career at the university as an instructor in mathematics and Latin, a professor of history and rhetoric, the commandant of cadets, and acting president of the university from 1895 to 1896. In 2017, Webb Hall underwent a major renovation that included the dismantling of Dole Auditorium. Following the commencement of the spring semester in 2019, Norwich University completed renovations on Webb Hall, which was briefly renamed North Hall. In 2020, North Hall became Schneider Hall, in honor of retiring Norwich University President Richard W. Schneider.

=== Cadet barracks ===
- Hawkins Hall – Named for General Rush Hawkins, a colonel in the Civil War, and philanthropist. Built in 1940 and renovated in 1994, 2008, and again in 2024.
- Dodge Hall – Named for Major General Grenville M. Dodge, a leader in the construction of the First transcontinental railroad and US Congressman. Originally named Cabot Hall, it was built in 1937 and renovated in 1998, 2013, and in 2023.
- Patterson Hall – Named for a 1909 graduate in civil engineering and a trustee. Built in 1958. Renovated in 2017.
- Goodyear Hall – Named for Major General A. Conger Goodyear, a trustee and founder of the Museum of Modern Art. Built in 1955 and renovated in 1999 and again in 2015
- Wilson Hall – Named for Governor of Vermont, Stanley Calef Wilson. Renovated in 2011
- Alumni Hall – First housing-only hall at the Northfield campus, named for the significantalumnis contributions that allowed for its construction. Built in 1905 and renovated in 2005
- Ransom Hall – Named after Colonel Truman B. Ransom, the second president of the university, who was killed leading the assault on Chapultepec during the Mexican–American War. Built in 1957
- Gerard Hall – Named after industrialist and philanthropist Jacques A. Gerard, who became a trustee in 1959. Built in 1962, and renovated in 2010
- Crawford Hall – Named after David C. Crawford (1952) and after whom the School of Engineering is also named, it is the first residence hall to not be on the Upper Parade Ground and was typically reserved for traditional students. As of 2012, it housed both upperclassmen in the Corps of Cadets and civilians. Since the opening of South Hall, it solely houses cadets. Built in 1988.

=== Residence halls ===
- South Hall – It is the second dorm to be located off of the Upper Parade Ground and is reserved for traditional students. Built in 2009, it opened for the 2009–10 school year.
- Dalrymple Hall – The newest residence hall, completed in 2014 for $23.2 million.

=== Athletic buildings ===
==== Andrews Hall ====
Andrews Hall, built in 1980, houses the Department of Athletics. In addition, it has basketball and racquetball courts and the equipment and athletic training rooms for the university's varsity and intramural teams. The Athletic Hall of Fame is also located in Andrews Hall. The facility honors trustee Paul R. Andrews (NU 1930).

==== Kreitzberg Arena ====
Kreitzberg Arena is home to the men's and women's varsity ice hockey teams, as well as the school's club team.

==== Plumley Armory ====
The armory, built in 1928, is named to honor a notable 1896 graduate of the university, Charles A. Plumley. Plumley served as the president of the university from 1930 to 1934 when he was elected to Congress as Vermont's sole representative from 1934 to 1951. The main floor of the building provides seating space for 4,000 in an area as large as three basketball courts. There is an elevated running track as well as locker rooms, training rooms, and Navy ROTC offices in the basement. Connected to the armory is Goodyear Pool. Built in 1962, the pool is a 25 x 14 yard 6 lane facility that is open to all university members.

==== Sabine Field ====
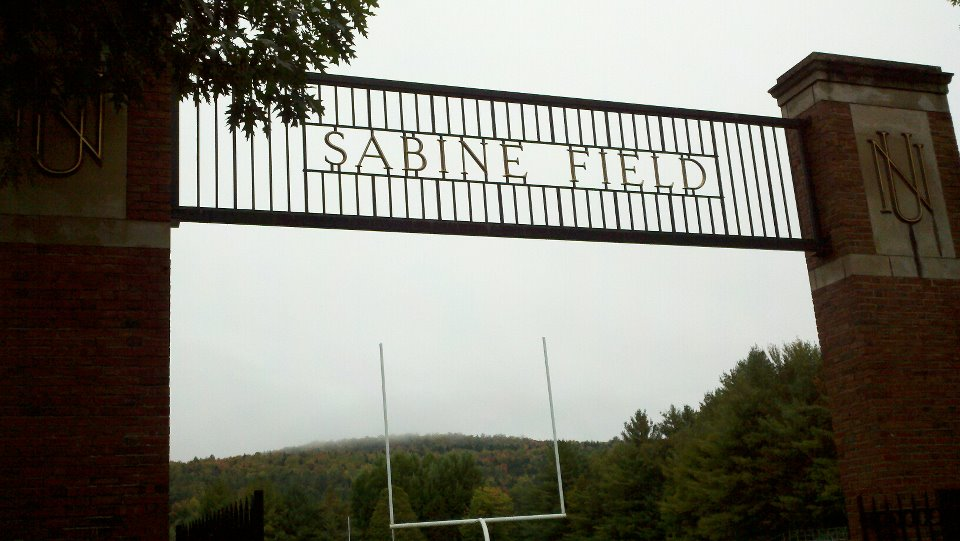
Sabine Field

Dedicated in 1921, Sabine Field was originally a venue for football, baseball, track, and outdoor ice hockey. Over time, as hockey moved indoors and baseball found its own home at Garrity Field, Sabine continued to serve the university football and cross country teams. Then in 2013, a renovation transformed Sabine Field into a multi-sport, multi-activity, lit stadium that can be used in most weather conditions. The improvements included a synthetic turf field that meets NCAA regulations for football, soccer, and lacrosse, a 400-meter resilient urethane running track with 42-inch lanes, energy-efficient stadium lights, a new sound system, bleachers, and press box, and other upgrades. On October 4, 2013, Sabine Field was officially renamed Sabine Field at Haynes Family Stadium. Sabine Field was dedicated in 1921 in honor of the memory of 1868 graduate Dr. George K. Sabine's son, George K. Sabine Jr., who died shortly after returning from overseas.

==== Shapiro Field House ====
Shapiro Field House, built in 1987 and named for trustee Jacob Shapiro (NU 1936), houses a multipurpose arena that has a 200-meter indoor running track, four tennis courts, and a climbing wall. It is also used for morning PT (Physical Training), athletic practices, commencement, concerts, and other university functions.

=== Other buildings ===
==== The Harmon Memorial ====
The Harmon Memorial is a tribute to Major General Ernest Harmon, who attended Norwich University from 1912 to 1913 and was later president from 1950 to 1968. Recorded on the memorial, by year of death, are the names of alumni, faculty, staff, and friends of Norwich University that have made a "significant contribution" to the university.

==== Harmon Hall & Wise Campus Center ====
Harmon Hall opened in 1955 and later enlarged in 1958. Since then, it has served as the focal point for student life and activities. The campus mess hall, bookstore, post office, and The Mill (a snack bar open to Corps upperclassmen and civilians) are located on the lower two floors. The Foreign Student Office, Student Activities, Yearbook Office, Music Program offices, a game room, and a lounge were located on the top floor. This floor originally housed the departments of English, History, and Modern Languages until they were moved to Webb Hall in 1960. Harmon Hall was renovated in 2007. The addition to Harmon Hall is named the Wise Campus Center.

==== Jackman Hall ====
Norwich University moved to Northfield from Norwich, Vermont, in 1866 when the South Barracks at the older location were destroyed by fire. Old Jackman Hall was the first building to be constructed at the new central Vermont site. The building was erected in 1868, and named Jackman Hall in 1907 to honor Brigadier General Alonzo Jackman (NU 1836) a faculty member, proponent of the Transatlantic telegraph cable and militia Brigadier General during the American Civil War. From its construction till 1905 the building served as housing for cadets. In the mid-1950s Jackman Hall was extensively remodeled and modernized, however, it became apparent that the almost century-old barracks were too costly to maintain. It was decided that rather than pay for near continual upkeep to build a new hall on the same site. As many newer barracks had been built since its original construction it was decided that the new Jackman Hall would serve as the primary administration building. Currently, the Army and Air Force ROTC departments are also housed in Jackman Hall.

==== White Chapel ====
Constructed by a gift from Eugene L. White (NU 1914), a trustee, the chapel was completed in 1941. Originally designed as a multi-purpose building, then White Hall has served as a mess hall with a dining room, lunch room, kitchen, a college store, and a recreational room. White Hall was converted to the university's first single-purpose chapel after Harmon Hall was opened in 1955. There are two bronze plaques on the walls that honor the Norwich war dead. Weekly services include Catholic Mass on Wednesday and Sunday, non-denominational service on Sunday, and Islamic prayer on Friday.

==== Sullivan Museum and History Center ====
One of the newer buildings on the campus, the Sullivan Museum was opened on January 22, 2007. The building is named after General Gordon R. Sullivan (ret.), Norwich class of 1959 and former U.S. Army Chief of Staff. The Sullivan Museum houses state-of-the-art conservation, storage, and display facilities for the wide variety of Norwich University artifacts and memorabilia. Items currently displayed cover a wide spectrum of Norwich history, including uniforms worn by Alden Partridge and Alonzo Jackman to pieces from more recent history.

== Students and organization ==
Norwich University has more than 4,000 students, including over 2,500 traditional undergraduate students and more than 1,500 in the university's online programs, which includes nearly 800 graduate students and over 700 in undergraduate degree-completion programs. As of 2018, Norwich University has 162 full-time faculty and more than 200 part-time faculty. In attendance in 2018 are 81 international students and scholars and exchange students, representing 30 countries.

Concurrent service for cadets in reserve components is permitted. Some students serve with either the Vermont National Guard or 3rd battalion of the 172nd Infantry Regiment based out of the Vermont National Guard Armory in nearby Berlin, Vermont.

Norwich cadets may participate in the Coast Guard Auxiliary University Program (AUP). Because the Coast Guard does not sponsor a traditional ROTC, the AUP provides a pathway for cadets interested in commissioning in the Coast Guard.

=== Corps of Cadets ===
Norwich is one of six senior military colleges in the United States.

=== Special units ===
The college has several special units that are supervised by federal ROTC units. The Army Reserve Officers' Training Corps (AROTC) detachment contains the Norwich Artillery Battery, the Norwich Ranger Company, the Ranger Challenge team, and the Mountain Cold Weather Company. The Air Force Reserve Officers' Training Corps (AFROTC) detachment sponsors a chapter of Arnold Air Society and its civilian component, Silver Wings.

== Academics ==
Norwich has 29 majors across six academic divisions with the most popular major being criminal justice.

=== Graduate program ===
The College of Graduate and Continuing Studies oversees the university's online graduate programs as well as six online bachelor's degree completion programs. The majority of the graduate programs are conducted on a distance learning platform, including a combined 5-year Master of Architecture program and a National Security Agency-sponsored Centers of Academic Excellence in Information Assurance Education.

=== Rankings ===
Norwich was ranked by U.S. News & World Report in 2014 at 74th in the Regional Universities (North) category.

== Athletics ==
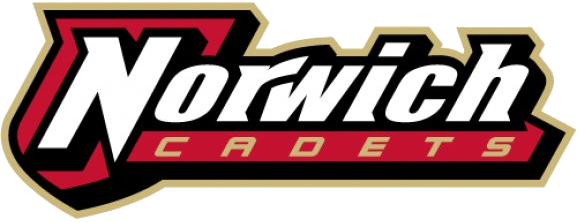
Norwich Cadets wordmark

Norwich's athletics teams are nicknamed the Cadets. The university offers 20 varsity sports, including baseball, men's and women's basketball, men's and women's cross country, football, men's and women's ice hockey, men's and women's lacrosse, men's and women's rugby, men's and women's soccer, men's and women's swimming and diving, softball, men's tennis, wrestling, and women's volleyball. Golf was reinstated as a varsity sport for fall 2022. The Cadets compete at the NCAA Division III level and are affiliated with four conferences, mainly the Great Northeast Athletic Conference (GNAC) and the Eastern Collegiate Athletic Conference (ECAC). The football team joined the New England Women's and Men's Athletic Conference in 2017. The college also has several student clubs for sports such as paintball, fencing, horseback riding, etc.

=== Football ===
The Cadets first fielded a football team in 1893. Among early notable moments is a 28–6 loss to Boston College at Fenway Park in 1914, the first college football game ever played at that venue. Overall, the program has appeared in seven ECAC bowl games (1984, 2003, 2004, 2010, 2012, 2013, 2014) and two NCAA Division III tournaments (2011, 2015). Norwich has produced 16 All-Americans, and has won or shared four Eastern Collegiate Football Conference (ECFC) Championships (2009, 2011, 2013–shared with Gallaudet University, 2015). Six former Cadets have reached an NFL camp.

Norwich was a member of the ECFC from 2009 to 2016, and departed the league with a 46–10 record in conference games. In 2017, Norwich joined the NEWMAC as an affiliate member for football.

The Cadets' home field is Sabine Field at Haynes Family Stadium. The field underwent a massive renovation for the 2013 season, transitioning from grass to turf, and adding lights for night contests. Campus folklore includes a tale of a ghost of an old cavalry cadet who guards the gate to the stadium.

One notable coach was E. Dewey Graham.

==== Rivalries ====
Norwich's most prominent football rivals include Middlebury College, Castleton University, and the United States Coast Guard Academy. Norwich also plays long-time opponent St. Lawrence University for an annual trophy. The series with Middlebury concluded after the 1991 season, after 99 contests, with the NESCAC's decision to eliminate non-conference football competition. Castleton founded their football program in 2009, and the Norwich game quickly became an intense rivalry. The Norwich/Coast Guard series (the Little Army/Navy Game) had been dormant after the 2005 game, but resumed again in 2017.

All these rivalry games involve a traveling trophy awarded to the winner:

- Norwich vs. Middlebury: The Wadsworth Trophy
- Norwich vs. Coast Guard: The Mug
- Norwich vs. Castleton: The Maple Sap Bucket
- Norwich vs. St. Lawrence: The Hoffman Cup

=== Rugby ===
Women's rugby has existed at Norwich since 1985 and gained varsity status in 2008. They won the inaugural USA Rugby Collegiate Division II National Championship in the spring of 2012 and a USA Rugby Collegiate Division 1 National Sevens Title in the fall of 2011.

=== Ice hockey ===
Men's ice hockey began play in 1909 and has become a national powerhouse. The program has won regular-season conference championships in 20 of the last 22 seasons. The Cadets have won four NCAA Division III Men's Ice Hockey Championship titles (2000, 2003, 2010, and 2017). The program has reached the NCAA Division III Frozen Four 13 times. Dozens of players have gone on to professional careers, and three alumni have reached the NHL (Frank Simonetti, Keith Aucoin, Kurtis McLean).

In 2007–08 Norwich women's ice hockey was elevated to varsity status. A year later, the Cadets won their first-ever ECAC East conference championship and advanced to the NCAA Division III Women's Ice Hockey tournament. They have won 8 conference championships, and have reached 7 final fours. Norwich won the program's first NCAA Division III title in 2001, and won again in 2018.

=== Swim & dive ===
Norwich University Swim and Dive is an NCAA Division III program competing in the Great Northeast Athletic Conference (GNAC). Both the men’s and women’s teams have earned multiple conference championships, including recent three-peat titles in the mid-2020s. The teams train in Goodyear Pool on the Norwich campus and are known for consistent conference success and producing GNAC award-winning swimmers and divers.

=== Other sports ===
The women's lacrosse program gained varsity status in 2008. They won 3 consecutive Great Northeast Athletic Conference Titles (2010, 2011, 2012), advancing to the NCAA Division III Tournament each time.

Norwich's rifle team won the national intercollegiate rifle championship in 1916 and 1920.

=== National championships ===
Rifle (2): 1916, 1920

Women's Rugby (6): 2011 Division I Sevens (USA Rugby), 2012 Division II 15s (USA Rugby), 2012 Division I Sevens (USA Rugby), 2013 Division I Sevens (USA Rugby), 2013 Division I 15s (ACRA), 2014 Division I Sevens (ACRA)

Men's Hockey (4): 2000, 2003, 2010, 2017

Women's Hockey (2): 2011, 2018

Drill Team: 2009

== Notable alumni ==
One-hundred thirty-eight graduates of Norwich University have served as general officers in the U.S. armed forces, including 102 Army generals, twelve Air Force generals, 9 Marine Corps generals, and 16 Navy admirals. Twenty-six graduates served as generals in foreign armies, including nine Royal Thai Army generals, a Royal Thai Air Force general, and sixteen Republic of China Army generals.

== Notable faculty and administrators ==
=== Norwich University presidents ===
The presidents of Norwich University include:

1. Alden Partridge, 1819–1843
2. Truman B. Ransom (Class of 1825), 1844–1847
3. Henry Wheaton (Class of 1841), 1848–1849
4. Edward Bourns, 1850–1865
5. Thomas Walker, 1867–1868
6. Roger Howard, 1869–1871
7. Malcolm Douglass, 1871–1875
8. Charles Curtis (Class of 1837), 1875
9. Josiah Swett (Class of 1837), 1875–1877
10. Charles Curtis (Class of 1861), 1877–1880
11. Charles Lewis (Class of 1855), 1880–1892
12. Allan Brown, 1896–1904
13. Charles Spooner (Class of 1878), 1904–1915
14. Ira Reeves, 1915–1917
15. Charles Albert Plumley (Class of 1896), 1920–1934
16. Porter Adams, 1934–1939
17. John Thomas, 1939–1944
18. Homer Dodge, 1944–1950
19. Ernest N. Harmon (Class of 1916), 1950–1965
20. Barksdale Hamlett, 1965–1972
21. Loring Hart, 1972–1982
22. W. Russell Todd (Class of 1950), 1982–1992
23. Richard Schneider, 1992–2020
24. Mark Anarumo, 2020–2024
25. John Broadmeadow (Class of 1983), 2024–present

=== Faculty and administrators ===
- Paul A. Chase, professor of military science (1944–1946), Associate Justice of the Vermont Supreme Court
- Jay H. Gordon, professor of accounting
- Alonzo Jackman, professor and librarian
- Leon Kromer, commandant of cadets (1941–1943)
- Steven E. Sodergren, professor of history and chair of the department of history and political science
- Andrea Talentino, dean of the college of liberal arts (2012–2017), ninth president of Augustana College
- Frank Tompkins, professor of military science and tactics 1910, commandant of cadets (1910–1913, 1916–1917, 1919, 1923)
- Mitchell Yockelson, professor of military history
