= List of Scabbard and Blade members =

Scabbard and Blade (S&B) was an American collegiate military honor society. It was founded at the University of Wisconsin in 1904. Its membership was open to Reserve Officers' Training Corps (ROTC) cadets and midshipmen of all military services. It was founded as a men's organization and later became a co-educational society. Its membership categories included active, alumni, associate, and honorary. Associate members included active or retired commissioned officers who did not join the society during college or civilian college officials. Honorary membership was awarded to civilians for accomplishments and contributions to national defense.

Following are some of the notable members of Scabbard and Blade.

== Academia ==
- Joseph Bondy, chancellor of Syracuse University and New York State Assembly
- Warren E. Bow, second president of Wayne University
- Edward M. Coffman, military historian and professor emeritus at the University of Wisconsin-Madison
- Gaylord Harnwell, president of the University of Pennsylvania
- Wendell Nedderman (1976), president of the University of Texas at Arlington
- Kenneth W. Winters, president of Campbellsville University and Kentucky State Senate

== Business ==
- Daniel Guggenheim (honorary), mining magnate, philanthropist, who played a major role in aviation and rocketry
- William Thornton Kemper Jr., banker and philanthropist
- Conrad Prebys, property developer and philanthropist
- Sam Walton, founder of Walmart and Sam's Club

== Entertainment and literature ==
- Phil Harris, musician
- James Earl Jones, actor
- Will Rogers (honorary), vaudeville performer, actor, and humorous social commentator
- Terry Spear, novelist
- Fred Waring (honorary), musician, bandleader, choral director, and radio and television personality

== Law ==
- James E. Beasley Sr., trial lawyer
- Jerome O'Neill, United States attorney for Vermont

== Military ==
- Marcus B. Bell, United States Army brigadier general
- John P. Coursey, United States Army brigadier general
- John A. Dabney, United States Army general
- Roger Donlon (honorary), first person to receive the Medal of Honor in the Vietnam War
- Hugh Aloysius Drum, United States Army general
- Harold Keith Johnson, United States Army general who served as chief of staff of the United States Army
- Curtis E. LeMay, US Air Force general and chief of staff of the United States Air Force
- Thomas J. Lynch, United States Army Air Forces pilot
- Robert Claude Maze, military officer and aviator
- Edward J. O'Neill, United States Army general
- John J. Pershing (honorary), United States Army general who commanded the American Expeditionary Forces during World War I, educator, and the founder of the Pershing Rifles
- John C. Persons, United States Army general and lawyer
- Kenneth R. Powell, United States Air Force general
- Thomas L. Ridge, United States Marine Corps officer
- David M. Shoup, United States Marine Corps general
- Jeffrey W. Talley, chief of Army Reserve and commanding general of the United States Army Reserve Command
- Lewis William Walt, United States Marine Corps general
- William Westmoreland, 25th chief of staff of the United States Army
- Lester J. Whitlock, United States Army major general

== Politics and government ==
- Joseph Bondy, New York State Assembly and chancellor of Syracuse University
- John E. Davis, 25th governor of North Dakota and director of the Defense Civil Preparedness Agency
- Gwynn Garnett, administrator of the Foreign Agricultural Service
- Dennis Hightower (1960), U.S. deputy secretary of commerce
- Herbert Hoover, president of the United States
- Franklin D. Roosevelt (honorary), president of the United States
- Dean Rusk, U.S. secretary of state
- Kenneth W. Winters, Kentucky State Senate and president of Campbellsville University

== Science and technology ==
- Gene Cernan, NASA astronaut, electrical engineer, and aeronautical engineer
- Charles A. Lindberg (honorary), aviator who made the first nonstop flight from New York to Paris
- Franklin Matthias, nuclear engineer
- R. Tom Sawyer, inventor known as the "father of the diesel locomotive"
- Robert L. Stewart, NASA astronaut and United States Army brigadier general
- John Young, astronaut and lunar explorer

== Sports ==
- John F. Christhilf, college lacrosse player, inducted into the National Lacrosse Hall of Fame
- Geary Eppley, University of Maryland athletic director and professor of agronomy
- Jerry Richardson, former professional football player and owner in the National Football League
- Norwood Sothoron, National Lacrosse Hall of Fame inductee
- Bobby Towns, professional football player

== See also ==
- List of Scabbard and Blade chapters
