= Janeway =

Janeway is a surname. Notable people with the surname include:

- Carol Brown Janeway (1944–2015), British editor and translator of many novels
- Charles Janeway (1943–2003), American immunologist
- Charles Alderson Janeway (1909–1981), American pediatrician
- Edward G. Janeway (1901–1986), American politician from Vermont
- Edward Gamaliel Janeway (1841–1911), American physician
- Eliot Janeway (1913–1993), American economist
- Elizabeth Janeway (1913–2005), American author
- Gertrude Janeway (1909–2003), American widow of Civil War veteran
- Harold Janeway (1936–2020), American politician from New Hampshire
- James Janeway (1636–1674), English author
- Margaret Janeway (1896–1981), American military physician in World War II
- Theodore Caldwell Janeway (1872–1917), American physician

== Fictional characters ==
- Kathryn Janeway, the main character in the television series Star Trek: Voyager

== See also ==
- Janeway Children's Health and Rehabilitation Centre, Canada
- Janeway lesion, a type of skin lesion
