= Edward Janeway =

Edward Janeway may refer to:

- Edward G. Janeway (1901–1986), Vermont politician
- Edward Gamaliel Janeway (1841–1911), American physician
