= Harold Janeway =

American politician (1936–2020)

Harold White Janeway

Member of the New Hampshire Senate from the 7th district
- In office December 6, 2006 – December 1, 2010
- Preceded by: Robert Flanders
- Succeeded by: Andy Sanborn

Personal details
- Born: February 3, 1936 Glen Cove, New York
- Died: August 20, 2020 (aged 84) Webster, New Hampshire
- Party: Democratic

Harold White Janeway (February 3, 1936 – August 20, 2020) was an American politician who served as a Democratic member of the New Hampshire Senate, representing the 7th District from 2006 to 2010. He was founder and president at White Mountain Investment, Inc, a director at the New Hampshire Charitable Foundation, and a Trustee of Milton Academy.

He died of cancer on August 20, 2020, in Webster, New Hampshire at age 84.

== Personal life ==
He was the son of Edward Gamaliel Janeway Sr. (1901-1986) and Elinor (White) Janeway (1905-1996). He had five siblings. His grandfather was Theodore Caldwell Janeway, and great-grandfather was Edward Gamaliel Janeway, both physicians. An uncle, Charles Alderson Janeway, was also a notable physician. He was also a descendant of Thomas Leiper.

On August 2, 1958, he married Elizabeth Winthrop Chanler (b. 1937), granddaughter of politician Lewis Stuyvesant Chanler, great-granddaughter of politician John Winthrop Chanler, 2nd great-granddaughter of Alexander Randall, 3rd great-granddaughter of William Backhouse Astor Sr. and John Randall, and a descendant of John Winthrop, Peter Stuyvesant and the Livingston family. They had five children: William, Roger Williams, Priscilla White, Nora and Augustus White Janeway.
