= Senator Janeway =

Senator Janeway may refer to:

- Edward G. Janeway (1901–1986), Vermont State Senate
- Harold Janeway (1936–2020), New Hampshire State Senate
