= Senator Boylan =

Senator Boylan may refer to:

- John H. Boylan (1907–1981), Vermont State Senate
- John J. Boylan (1878–1938), New York State Senate
