= List of Scabbard and Blade chapters =

Scabbard and Blade was a college military honor society founded at the University of Wisconsin in 1904. At its 1920 convention, its chapters, called companies, were organized into regiments, based on geographic locations within the United States, including:

- 1st District – Connecticut, Maine, Massachusetts, New Hampshire, Rhode Island, Vermont
- 2nd District – Delaware, District of Columbia, Maryland, New Jersey, New York
- 3rd District – Pennsylvania, West Virginia
- 4th District – North Carolina, South Carolina, Virginia
- 5th District – Alabama, Florida, Georgia, Tennessee, Puerto Rico
- 6th District – Kentucky, Michigan, Ohio
- 7th District – Illinois, Indiana, Wisconsin
- 8th District – Arkansas, Louisiana, Mississippi
- 9th District – Iowa, Missouri
- 10th District – Minnesota, North Dakota, South Dakota
- 11th District – Kansas, Nebraska, Oklahoma, Texas
- 12th District – Colorado, New Mexico, Utah, Wyoming
- 13th District – Idaho, Montana, Oregon, Washington, California
- 14th District – Arizona, Nevada, parts of California

Following is a list of the Scabbard and Blade companies, with inactive institutions in italics.

Regiment	Company	Charter date and range	Institution	Location	Status	Ref.
1st	A (First)	1904–c. 2010	University of Wisconsin–Madison	Madison, Wisconsin	Inactive	
1st	A (Second)	2010–c. 2021	University of North Carolina at Charlotte	Charlotte, North Carolina	Inactive	
1st	B	1905	University of Minnesota	Minneapolis, Minnesota	Inactive	
1st	C	1906–c. 2021	Cornell University	Ithaca, New York	Inactive	
1st	D	1906–before 1962	University of Iowa	Iowa City, Iowa	Inactive	
1st	E	1908	Purdue University	West Lafayette, Indiana	Inactive	
1st	F	1909	University of Illinois Urbana-Champaign	Urbana, Illinois	Inactive	
1st	G	1911	University of Missouri	Columbia, Missouri	Inactive	
1st	H	1912–after June 2011	Pennsylvania State University	University Park, Pennsylvania	Inactive	
1st	I	1914	University of Washington	Seattle, Washington	Inactive	
1st	K	1914	Michigan State University	East Lansing, Michigan	Inactive	
1st	L	1914	Kansas State University	Manhattan, Kansas	Inactive	
1st	M	1915–after June 2011	Ohio State University	Columbus, Ohio	Inactive	
2nd	A	1915	Iowa State University	Ames, Iowa	Inactive	
2nd	B	1916	University of Arkansas	Fayetteville, Arkansas	Inactive	
2nd	C	1916–after June 2011	West Virginia University	Morgantown, West Virginia	Inactive	
2nd	D	1916–before 1977	University of Maine	Orono, Maine	Inactive	
2nd	E	1916	Washington State University	Pullman, Washington	Inactive	
2nd	F	1920	Indiana University	Bloomington, Indiana	Inactive	
2nd	G	1920	Oregon State University	Corvallis, Oregon	Inactive	
2nd	H	1920	University of Florida	Gainesville, Florida	Inactive	
2nd	I	1920	Johns Hopkins University	Baltimore, Maryland	Inactive	
2nd	K	1920–after June 2011	Oklahoma State University–Stillwater	Stillwater, Oklahoma	Inactive	
2nd	L	1920–after June 2011	University of Georgia	Athens, Georgia	Inactive	
2nd	M	1921–after June 2011	Georgia Tech	Atlanta, Georgia	Inactive	
3rd	A	1921–before 1962	Coe College	Cedar Rapids, Iowa	Inactive	
3rd	B	1921–before 1962	University of North Dakota	Grand Forks, North Dakota	Inactive	
3rd	C	1921–before 1962	University of Nebraska	Lincoln, Nebraska	Inactive	
3rd	D	1921–before 1962	University of Oklahoma	Norman, Oklahoma	Inactive	
3rd	E	1922–before 1977	Gettysburg College	Gettysburg, Pennsylvania	Inactive	
3rd	F	1922–before 1962	University of Vermont	Burlington, Vermont	Inactive	
3rd	G	1922	North Carolina State University	Raleigh, North Carolina	Inactive	
3rd	H	1922	Lehigh University	Bethlehem, Pennsylvania	Inactive	
3rd	I	1922–before 1977	University of Maryland	College Park, Maryland	Inactive	
3rd	K	1922–before 1962	Northwestern University	Evanston, Illinois	Inactive	
3rd	L	1922	University of Pennsylvania	Philadelphia, Pennsylvania	Inactive	
3rd	M	1922–before 1962	North Dakota State University	Fargo, North Dakota	Inactive	
4th	A	1922–before 1977	Utah State University	Logan, Utah	Inactive	
4th	B	1922–after June 2011	Syracuse University	Syracuse, New York	Inactive	
4th	C	1923	University of Cincinnati	Cincinnati, Ohio	Inactive	
4th	D	1923	University of Kentucky	Lexington, Kentucky	Inactive	
4th	E	1923–before 1962	University of Montana	Missoula, Montana	Inactive	
4th	F	1923–after June 2011	University of Michigan	Ann Arbor, Michigan	Inactive	
4th	G	1923–after June 2011	University of Kansas	Lawrence, Kansas	Inactive	
4th	H	1923–after June 2011	Colorado State University	Fort Collins, Colorado	Inactive	
4th	I	April 1923–after June 2011	University of Tennessee	Knoxville, Tennessee	Inactive	(Note: Chapter formed from a local military honor group, established on the UT campus on January 4, 1923.)
4th	K	1923–after June 2011	University of Arizona	Tucson, Arizona	Inactive	
4th	L	1923–before 1962	Emory University	Atlanta, Georgia	Inactive	
4th	M	1923–before 1962	University of California	Berkeley, California	Inactive	
5th	A	1923–before 1962	DePauw University	Greencastle, Indiana	Inactive	
5th	B	1923	Davidson College	Davidson, North Carolina	Inactive	
5th	C	1923–after June 2011	Rutgers University–New Brunswick	New Brunswick and Piscataway, New Jersey	Inactive	
5th	D	1923	Knox College	Galesburg, Illinois	Inactive	
5th	E	1923–after June 2011	Louisiana State University	Baton Rouge, Louisiana	Inactive	
5th	F	1923–before 1962	Stanford University	Stanford, California	Inactive	
5th	G	1924	Massachusetts Institute of Technology	Cambridge, Massachusetts	Inactive	
5th	H	1924	University of Washington	Seattle, Washington	Inactive	
5th	I	1924	University of South Dakota	Vermillion, South Dakota	Inactive	
5th	K	1924	University of Alabama	Tuscaloosa, Alabama	Inactive	
5th	L	1924	Auburn University	Auburn, Alabama	Inactive	
5th	M	1957–before 1962	University of Utah	Salt Lake City, Utah	Inactive	
6th	A	1925–after June 2011	University of California, Los Angeles	Los Angeles, California	Inactive	
6th	B	1925	University of Idaho	Moscow, Idaho	Inactive	
6th	C	1925	University of Akron	Akron, Ohio	Inactive	
6th	D	1925–before 1977	Montana State University	Bozeman, Montana	Inactive	
6th	E	1926	New York University	New York City, New York	Inactive	
6th	F	1926–before 1977	University of New Hampshire	Durham, New Hampshire	Inactive	
6th	G	1926–before 1977	Carnegie Tech University	Pittsburgh, Pennsylvania	Inactive	
6th	H	1927	University of Rhode Island	Kingston, Rhode Island	Inactive	
6th	I	May 15, 1927 – 1979	South Dakota State University	Brookings, South Dakota	Inactive	
6th	K	1928–after June 2011	Boston University	Boston, Massachusetts	Inactive	
6th	L	1928	University of Oregon	Eugene, Oregon	Inactive	
6th	M	1928	Wofford College	Spartanburg, South Carolina	Inactive	
7th	A	1928–after June 2011	Drexel University	Philadelphia, Pennsylvania	Inactive	
7th	B	1929–after June 2011	Mississippi State University	Mississippi State, Mississippi	Inactive	
7th	C	1929–before 1962	University of Nevada	Reno, Nevada	Inactive	
7th	D	1929	University of Pittsburgh	Pittsburgh, Pennsylvania	Inactive	
7th	E	1929	University of Wyoming	Laramie, Wyoming	Inactive	
7th	F	1930	Wichita State University	Wichita, Kansas	Inactive	
7th	G	1932	Colorado School of Mines	Golden, Colorado	Inactive	
7th	H	1932	Lafayette College	Easton, Pennsylvania	Inactive	
7th	I	1932	University of Delaware	Newark, Delaware	Inactive	
7th	K	1933–after June 2011	Clemson University	Clemson, South Carolina	Inactive	
7th	L	1938–2021	Virginia Tech	Blacksburg, Virginia	Inactive	
7th	M	1938–after June 2011	Arkansas State University	Jonesboro, Arkansas	Inactive	
8th	A	1939	Ohio University	Athens, Ohio	Inactive	
8th	B	1940	University of Mississippi	Oxford, Mississippi	Inactive	
8th	C	1941	Duquesne University	Pittsburgh, Pennsylvania	Inactive	
8th	D	1941	University of San Francisco	San Francisco, California	Inactive	
8th	E	1942	Tulane University	New Orleans, Louisiana	Inactive	
8th	F	1949–before 1977	University of Denver	Denver, Colorado	Inactive	
8th	G	1949	University of Texas at Austin	Austin, Texas	Inactive	
8th	H	1949	West Virginia State University	Institute, West Virginia	Inactive	
8th	I	1949–after June 2011	Hampton University	Hampton, Virginia	Inactive	
8th	K	1949	College of William & Mary	Williamsburg, Virginia	Inactive	
8th	L	1949	University of North Carolina at Chapel Hill	Chapel Hill, North Carolina	Inactive	
8th	M	1949	Kent State University	Kent, Ohio	Inactive	
9th	A	1949	University of Dayton	Dayton, Ohio	Inactive	
9th	B	1950	Jacksonville State University	Jacksonville, Alabama	Inactive	
9th	C	1950–before 1977	Southern Methodist University	Dallas, Texas	Inactive	
9th	D	1950–after June 2011	Howard University	Washington, D.C.	Inactive	
9th	E	1950	University of Toledo	Toledo, Ohio	Inactive	
9th	F	1950	Virginia State University	Ettrick, Virginia	Inactive	
9th	G	1950	Temple University	Philadelphia, Pennsylvania	Inactive	
9th	H	1951	Mercer University	Macon, Georgia	Inactive	
9th	I	1951	Georgetown University	Washington, D.C.	Inactive	
9th	L	1951	University of California, Davis	Davis, California	Inactive	
9th	M	1951	University of California, Santa Barbara	Santa Barbara, California	Inactive	
10th	A	1951–before 1962	Tulane University	New Orleans, Louisiana	Inactive	
10th	B	1951	North Carolina A&T State University	Greensboro, North Carolina	Inactive	
10th	C	1955–before 1962	Wayne State University	Detroit, Michigan	Inactive	
10th	D (First)	1952-1991	Stetson University	DeLand, Florida	Inactive, Reassigned	(Note: Chapter closed when the university closed its ROTC program.)
10th	D (Second)	2024	Embry–Riddle Aeronautical University, Daytona Beach	Daytona Beach, Florida	Active	
10th	E	1952	University of Connecticut	Storrs, Connecticut	Inactive	
10th	F	1952	Florida A&M University	Tallahassee, Florida	Inactive	
10th	G	1952–after June 2011	University of Miami	Coral Gables, Florida	Inactive	
10th	H	1953	John Carroll University	University Heights, Ohio	Inactive	
10th	I	1953	City College of New York	New York City, New York	Inactive	
10th	K	1953	Presbyterian College	Clinton, South Carolina	Inactive	
10th	L	1953	Washington and Lee College	Lexington, Virginia	Inactive	
10th	M	1953	Vanderbilt University	Nashville, Tennessee	Inactive	
11th	A	1953	University of Richmond	Richmond, Virginia	Inactive	
11th	B	1953	St. Lawrence University	Boston, Massachusetts	Inactive	
11th	C	1954	Western Kentucky University	Bowling Green, Kentucky	Inactive	
11th	D	1954–after June 2011	Texas Tech University	Lubbock, Texas	Inactive	
11th	E	1954	Furman College	Greenville, South Carolina	Inactive	
11th	F	1954–after June 2011	Georgia State University	Atlanta, Georgia	Inactive	
11th	G	1954	Hofstra University	Hempstead, New York	Inactive	
11th	H	1954	Northeastern University	Boston, Massachusetts	Inactive	
11th	I	1954	Loyola University	New Orleans, Louisiana	Inactive	
11th	K	1954	Niagara University	Lewiston, New York	Inactive	
11th	L	1954–after June 2011	Wake Forest University	Winston-Salem, North Carolina	Inactive	
11th	M	1955–after June 2011	East Tennessee State University	Johnson City, Tennessee	Inactive	
12th	A	1955–after June 2011	Santa Clara University	Santa Clara, California	Inactive	
12th	B	1955	Pittsburg State University	Pittsburg, Kansas	Inactive	
12th	C	1955	South Carolina State University	Orangeburg, South Carolina	Inactive	
12th	D	1955	Saint Peter's University	Jersey City, New Jersey	Inactive	
12th	E	1955	Florida State University	Tallahassee, Florida	Inactive	
12th	F	1955	South Dakota School of Mines and Technology	Rapid City, South Dakota	Inactive	
12th	G	1956	Marquette University	Milwaukee, Wisconsin	Inactive	
12th	H	1956	Prairie View A&M University	Prairie View, Texas	Inactive	
12th	I	1956–after June 2011	North Georgia College & State University	Dahlonega, Georgia	Inactive	
12th	K	1956	Marshall University	Huntington, West Virginia	Inactive	
12th	L	1956	Pratt Institute	Brooklyn, New York	Inactive	
12th	M	1956	University of Texas at El Paso	El Paso, Texas	Inactive	
13th	A	1956––after June 2011	Murray State University	Murray, Kentucky	Inactive	
13th	B	1956	Northeast Louisiana University	Monroe, Louisiana	Inactive	
13th	C	1956	Seattle University	Seattle, Washington	Inactive	
13th	D	1956–before 1962	DePaul University	Chicago, Illinois	Inactive	
13th	E	1956	Westminster University	Salt Lake City, Utah	Inactive	
13th	F	1956	Sam Houston State University	Huntsville, Texas	Inactive	
13th	G	1956–before 1962	San Jose State University	San Jose, California	Inactive	
13th	H	1956	California State Polytechnic College	San Luis Obispo, California	Inactive	
13th	I	1956	University of Houston	Houston, Texas	Inactive	
13th	K	1956	Polytechnic Institute of Brooklyn	Brooklyn, New York	Inactive	
13th	L	1957	Idaho State University	Pocatello, Idaho	Inactive	
13th	M	1957	Central State University	Wilberforce, Ohio	Inactive	
14th	A	1957	Spring Hill College	Mobile, Alabama	Inactive	
14th	B	1959	University of Wisconsin–Milwaukee	Milwaukee, Wisconsin	Inactive	
14th	C	1958	University of Colorado Boulder	Boulder, Colorado	Inactive	
14th	D	1958	Gannon University	Erie, Pennsylvania	Inactive	
14th	E	1958	Ouachita Baptist University	Arkadelphia, Arkansas	Inactive	
14th	F	1959	Southern University	Baton Rouge, Louisiana	Inactive	
14th	G	1959	Lincoln University	Oakland, California	Inactive	
14th	H	1959	Thomas S. Clarkson Memorial College of Technology	Potsdam, New York	Inactive	
14th	I	1959	McNeese State University	Lake Charles, Louisiana	Inactive	
14th	K	1959	University of Southern Mississippi	Hattiesburg, Mississippi	Inactive	
14th	L	1960	Loyola University	New Orleans, Louisiana	Inactive	
14th	M	1960	University of Puerto Rico	San Juan, Puerto Rico	Inactive	
15th	A	1961	Midwestern State University	Wichita Falls, Texas	Inactive	
15th	B	1961	Youngstown State University	Youngstown, Ohio	Inactive	
15th	C	1961–after June 2011	Tennessee Tech	Cookeville, Tennessee	Inactive	
15th	D	1962	West Texas State University	Canyon, Texas	Inactive	
15th	E	1962	Arkansas Tech University	Russellville, Arkansas	Inactive	
15th	F	1963	Oklahoma Panhandle State University	Goodwell, Oklahoma	Inactive	
15th	G	1963	Henderson State University	Arkadelphia, Arkansas	Inactive	
15th	H	1964	Tuskegee University	Tuskegee, Alabama	Inactive	
15th	I	1964	University of Tennessee at Chattanooga	Chattanooga, Tennessee	Inactive	
15th	K	1964	Eastern Kentucky University	Richmond, Kentucky	Inactive	
15th	L	1964–after June 2011	University of Massachusetts Amherst	Amherst, Massachusetts	Inactive	
15th	M	1964	Washington Square College	New York City, New York	Inactive	
16th	A	1965	Western Michigan University	Kalamazoo, Michigan	Inactive	
16th	B	1965	University of Missouri Rolla	Rolla, Missouri	Inactive	
16th	C	1965	Eastern Michigan University	Ypsilanti, Michigan	Inactive	
16th	D	1966	Worcester Polytechnic Institute	Worcester, Massachusetts	Inactive	
16th	E	1966	Loyola University Chicago	Chicago, Illinois	Inactive	
16th	F	1966	Ripon College	Ripon, Wisconsin	Inactive	
16th	G	1967	Seton Hall University	South Orange, New Jersey	Inactive	
16th	H	1967	University of Tennessee at Martin	Martin, Tennessee	Inactive	
16th	I	1967	Southwest Missouri State College	Springfield, Missouri	Inactive	
16th	K	1968	Michigan Technological University	Houghton, Michigan	Inactive	
16th	L	1968	Bowling Green State University	Bowling Green, Ohio	Inactive	
16th	M	1968	New Mexico State University	Las Cruces, New Mexico	Inactive	
17th	A	1969	University of North Alabama	Florence, Alabama	Inactive	(Note: Chapter formed at Florence State University, now the University of North Alabama.)
17th	B	1969	Eastern New Mexico University	Portales, New Mexico	Inactive	
17th	C	1969	University of South Alabama	Mobile, Alabama	Inactive	
17th	D	1970	University of Central Oklahoma	Edmond, Oklahoma	Inactive	(Note: Chapter formed at Central State College, now University of Central Oklahoma.)
17th	E	1970–after June 2011	Morehead State University	Morehead, Kentucky	Inactive	
17th	F	1975–after June 2011	Appalachian State University	Boone, North Carolina	Inactive	
17th	G	1976	Stephen F. Austin University	Nacogdoches, Texas	Inactive	
17th	I	1976	Nicholls State University	Thibodaux, Louisiana	Inactive	
17th	K	1977	Southwestern Oklahoma State University	Weatherford, Oklahoma	Inactive	
17th	M	1977	University of Tampa	Tampa, Florida	Inactive	
18th	A	1976	Florida Southern College	Lakeland, Florida	Inactive	
18th	B	1977	University of Central Arkansas	Conway, Arkansas	Inactive	
18th	C	1977–after June 2011	Arizona State University	Tempe, Arizona	Inactive	
18th	D	1977–after June 2011	Rose–Hulman Institute of Technology	Terre Haute, Indiana	Inactive	
18th	E	1977	University of Texas at Arlington	Arlington, Texas	Inactive	
21st	C	2016–c. 2021	California State University, Fresno	Fresno, California	Inactive	
		–after June 2011	Cameron University	Lawton, Oklahoma	Inactive	
		–after June 2011	Elon University	Elon, North Carolina	Inactive	
		–after June 2011	Florida International University	Miami, Florida	Inactive	
		–after June 2011	James Madison University	Harrisonburg, Virginia	Inactive	
		–c. 2021	Marion Military Institute	Marion, Alabama	Inactive	
		–after June 2011	Norfolk State University	Norfolk, Virginia	Inactive	
		–after June 2011	Old Dominion University	Norfolk, Virginia	Inactive	
		–after June 2011	University of Louisville	Louisville, Kentucky	Inactive	
		–after June 2011	University of New Mexico	Albuquerque, New Mexico	Inactive	
		–after June 2011	University of South Florida St. Petersburg	St. Petersburg, Florida	Inactive	

== See also ==
- List of Scabbard and Blade members
