= Edward J. O'Neill (general) =

United States Army general

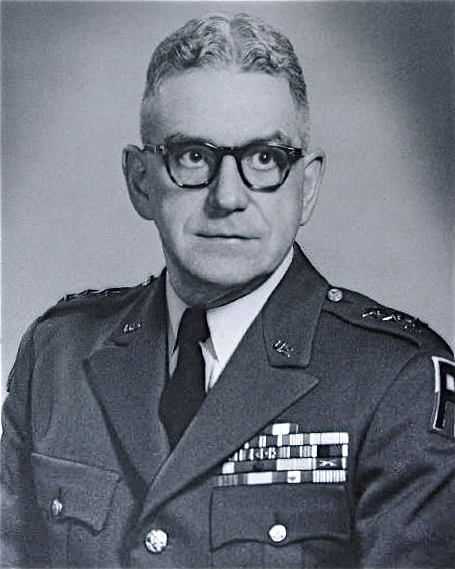
- Born: March 24, 1902; St. Albans, Vermont
- Died: January 9, 1979 (aged 76); Arlington, Virginia
- Burial place: Arlington National Cemetery
- Spouse: Marie Cronin (m. 1933)
- Children: 4
- Relatives: Jerome O'Neill (nephew)
- Military career
- Allegiance: United States
- Branch: United States Army
- Service years: 1924–1962
- Rank: Lieutenant General
- Commands: First United States Army; United States Army Communication Zone, Europe
- Conflicts: World War II: North African Campaign; Battle of Salerno; Battle of Anzio
- Awards: Army Distinguished Service Medal (2); Legion of Merit; Bronze Star Medal
- Other work: Consultant, Aerojet General Corporation

Edward Joseph O'Neill (March 24, 1902 – January 9, 1979) was a career United States Army officer and battalion combat commander in World War II. He later commanded logistics and support organizations and senior military staff in Europe during the Cold War-era.

== Early life ==
Edward J. O'Neill was born in St. Albans, Vermont, on March 24, 1902, a son of Jeremiah O'Neill and Catherine (Aher) O'Neill. He was educated in St. Albans, and graduated from St. Albans High School in 1920.

O'Neill attended the University of Vermont (UVM), from which he graduated in 1924 with a Bachelor of Philosophy degree. While at UVM, O'Neill was a member of the debate team, president of the student union, and president of the Boulder Society. He also belonged to the Wig and Buskin drama society, as well as the Tau Kappa Alpha and Zeta Chi fraternities.

During his college career, O'Neill participated in the Army Reserve Officers' Training Corps. He attained the grade of lieutenant colonel as UVM's top ranked cadet, and was a member of Scabbard and Blade. At graduation, he was designated an ROTC honor graduate and was commissioned a second lieutenant of Infantry.

== Career ==
=== World War II ===
O'Neill served in a variety of infantry commands and staff positions in the years between the world wars, with a tour in Hawaii and attendance at the Infantry School at Fort Benning, Georgia. In 1936 he began attendance at the Command and General Staff School, from which he graduated in 1937.

At the onset of World War II, O'Neill was a battalion commander in the 1st Infantry Division. In 1941 O'Neill became assistant then chief G-4, or chief of supplies and logistical support for the Fifth United States Army's VI Corps in the North Africa and Italian campaigns. He was responsible for supplying the Allied landing at Anzio, Italy in Operation Shingle. O'Neill ended the war as G-4 (staff officer for supply) for Fifth Army.

O'Neill graduated from the Industrial College of the Armed Forces in 1948.

=== Senior commands ===
In 1950, O'Neill was Deputy Chief of Staff of the European Command, redesignated Headquarters, United States Army, Europe. In August 1954 he was promoted to brigadier general and later took command of United States Army Communication Zone, Europe, the logistics and support organization for the United States Army, Europe.

In that position on May 12, 1958, O'Neill selected one of 13 casketed remains of unknown United States soldiers from American military cemeteries in Europe to represent the unknowns from the European Theater of Operations during World War II. After a further selection of unknowns from the Atlantic and Pacific theaters, the Unknown Soldier of World War II was interred in the Tomb of the Unknowns at Arlington National Cemetery on Memorial Day, 1958. O’Neill next served as Army Chief of Staff in Europe in 1959.

In March 1960, O'Neill was promoted to lieutenant general and assumed his final command of First United States Army at Fort Jay, Governors Island, New York. While there, he also served as senior United States Army representative to the United Nations Military Staff Committee. He retired after 31 years of active duty on March 31, 1962.

== Later life ==
Retiring to Arlington, Virginia, O'Neill was a consultant for Aerojet General Corporation in Washington, D.C. until 1970.

O'Neill died of a heart attack on January 9, 1979, and was buried at Arlington National Cemetery.

Military offices
Preceded by Blackshear M. Bryan	Commanding General, First United States Army; 1960–1962	Succeeded by Garrison H. Davidson
