= Kevin Chan =

Canadian physician

- Born: 1972 (age 53–54)
- Occupation: physician
- Known for: Chair of Pediatrics at Memorial University of Newfoundland
- Notable work: KidECare

Kevin Chan is The Chief Of Staff and Executive Vice President Medicine of Niagara Health, where he also works as a pediatrician. He was Acting CEO and Corporate Medical Executive at London Health Science Centre and he was the Chief of Women's and Children's Health at Trillium Health Partners, and Chair of Pediatrics at Memorial University of Newfoundland and Clinical Chief of Children's Health at the Janeway Children's Health and Rehabilitation Centre in St. John's, Newfoundland. He previously worked as an emergency physician at The Hospital for Sick Children.

He received a Bachelor of Science B.Sc. (Hon.) from the University of Toronto, an MD from the University of Ottawa, an MPH From Harvard University, and an MBA from the Rotman School of Management at the University of Toronto.

In 1994, Dr. Chan co-founded the Student University Network for Social and International Health or Reseau Etudiants Universitaire Pour la Sociale et Sante Internationale. He also helped found the Centre for International Health and Development at the University of Ottawa and the Centre for International Health at the University of British Columbia.

In 2001-2002, he was co-chair of the Canadian Society for International Health, and between 2001-2003 he was President of the International Child Health Section of the Canadian Paediatric Society. He was the recipient of the Chris Krogh award Prize from the Global Health Education Consortium (now Consortium of University for Global Health). He is a former president of the Emergency Medicine Section of the Canadian Pediatric Society, an executive member of the Section on International Child Health of the American Academy of Pediatrics, and currently chairs the Acute Care Committee of the Canadian Paediatric Society.

He is the winner of the Frank Knox Memorial Fellowship from Harvard University in 2002. In 2003, he won the Yale Johnson & Johnson Physician Scholarship in International Health. He has also been a recipient of the Pierre Elliott Trudeau Scholarship.

Chan has worked extensively in Malawi, Uganda, Tanzania and Zimbabwe, as well as in complex humanitarian emergency situations in Rwanda and Kosovo. He is a co-founder of KidECare, a pediatric urgent care clinic in Toronto.

Chan is the younger brother of the late Arnold Chan, a lawyer and Member of Parliament.
