= Terry Spear =

American writer

- Born: Sacramento, California, U.S.
- Education: West Texas State University
- Writing career
- Language: English
- Genres: Paranormal romance medieval romance

Terry Spear born in Sacramento, California, is an American author who specializes in writing paranormal romance novels and medieval romance novels for both adults and teen audiences. Her werewolf paranormal romance series started with Heart of the Wolf which Publishers Weekly named as one of their Best Books of the Year, 2008. She is also the author of the jaguar shifter series, Heart of the Jaguar which started in 2012 with the novel Savage Hunger and the cougar shifter series, Heart of Cougar which is self-published.

== Biography ==
A Distinguished Military Graduate, DMG, of West Texas State University, she was one of the first graduates of the United States Army Reserve Officer Training Corp two-year program, member of the military honor society, Scabbard and Blade, and retired as a Lieutenant Colonel from the USAR. She is a graduate of Monmouth University's MBA program and was featured in their Alumni magazine. She has written for a number of genealogy magazines for both the United States and Canada, short romances for confessionals, and articles for a teen magazine.

Heart of the Wolf received the 2008 Fall N.O.R. Reader Choice Awards for Best Paranormal Romance.

The urban fantasy series shows a contemporary world where humans who shape shift into wolves are so realistically portrayed, Publishers Weekly had this to say about Heart of the Wolf, "The vulpine couple's chemistry crackles off the page, but the real strength of the book lies in Spear's depiction of pack power dynamics, as well as in the details of human−wolf interaction. Her wolf world feels at once palpable and even plausible." And from Romantic Times, "A solidly crafted werewolf story, this tale centers on pack problems in a refreshingly straightforward way. The characters are well drawn and believable, which makes the contemporary plotline of this story of love and life among the lupus garou seem, well, realistic."

When interviewed, Spear talks about what influenced her to write such a realistic werewolf world: "For my wolf tales, Jack London’s Call of the Wild and White Fang helped influence my love of wolves and of their survival instincts, just like humans’ instincts to survive. I also was influenced by the way he told part of the story from the humans’ perspective and the wolves’. Ironically, I hadn't read them since I was a teen, but only vaguely recalled this about his works as I began Heart of the Wolf. Yet they still influenced my desire to make the werewolf world as close to the real world as possible."

== Silver Town Wolves ==
=== Silver Brothers ===
1. Destiny of the Wolf, Sourcebooks Casablanca, Mar 2009 [Couple: Lelandi Wildhaven & Darien Silver]
2. Wolf Fever, Sourcebooks Casablanca, Dec 2010 [Couple: Carol Woods & Ryan McKinley]
3. Dreaming of the Wolf, Sourcebooks Casablanc, Dec 2011 [Couple: Alicia Greiston & Jake Silver]
4. Silence of the Wolf, Sourcebooks Casablanca, Mar 2014 [Couple: Elizabeth Wildwood & Tom Silver]
5. A Silver Wolf Christmas, Sourcebooks Casablanca, October 2015 [Couple: Laurel MacTire & C J Silver]
6. Alpha Wolf Need Not Apply, Sourcebooks Casablanca, May 2016 [Couple: Pepper Grayling & Eric Silver]
7. Between a Wolf and a Hard Place, Sourcebooks Casablanca, April 2017 [Couple: Ellie MacTire & Brett Silver]
8. All's Fair In Love and Wolf, Sourcebooks Casablanca, May 2018 [Couple: Jenna St. James & Sarandon Silver]
9. Silver Town Wolf: Home for the Holidays, Sourcebooks Casablanca, September 2019 [Couple: Megan MacTire & Peter Jorgenson]

=== Wolff Brothers ===
1. You Had Me at Wolf, Sourcebooks Casablanca, February 2020 [Couple: Josie Grayson & Blake Wolff]
2. Jingle Bell Wolf, Sourcebooks Casablanca, Oct 2021 [Couple: Gabrielle Lowe & Landon Wolff]

==== Silver Town Novellas ====
- Tangling with the Wolf, Sourcebooks Casablanca, June 2021 [Couple: Hanna Bridgeman & Bryan "Phoenix" Wildhaven]

== Other Wolf Packs ==
=== Heart of the Wolf ===
1. Heart of the Wolf, Sourcebooks Casablanca, Apr 2008 [Couple: Bella Wilder & Devlyn Greystoke]
2. To Tempt the Wolf, Sourcebooks Casablanca, Sep 2009 [Couple: Tessa Anderson & Hunter Greymere]

==== Heart of the Wolf Novellas ====
- Night of the Wolf, Sourcebooks Casablanca, March 2021 [Couple: Serena Wilder & Tanner Greystroke]
- Day of the Wolf, Sourcebooks Casablanca, Sep 2021 [Couple: Carmela Wildhaven & Michael Hoffman]

=== White Wolves ===
1. Legend of the White Wolf, Sourcebooks Casablanca, Feb 2010 [Couple: Faith O'Malley & Cameron MacPherson]
2. Dreaming of a White Wolf Christmas, Sourcebooks Casablanca, Oct 2017 [Couple: Candice Mayfair & Owen Nottingham]
3. Flight of the White Wolf, Sourcebooks Casablanca, March 2018 [Couple: Amelia White & Gavin Summerfield]
4. While the Wolf's Away, Sourcebooks Casablanca, May 2022 [Couple: Elizabeth Simpson & David Davis]

==== White Wolf Novellas ====
- Wolf to the Rescue, Sourcebooks Casablanca, Apr 2022 [Couple: Stacey Grayson & Andrew White]

=== Highland Wolves ===
1. Heart of the Highland Wolf, Sourcebooks Casablanca, June 2011 [Couple: Julia Wildthorn & Ian MacNeill]
2. A Howl for a Highlander, Sourcebooks Casablanca, Feb 2013 [Couple: Shelley Campbell & Duncan MacNeill]
3. A Highland Werewolf Wedding, Sourcebooks Casablanca, May 2013 [Couple: Elaine Hawthorn & Cearnach MacNeill]
4. Hero of a Highland Wolf, Sourcebooks Casablanca, Aug 2014 [Couple: Colleen Playfair & Grant MacQuarrie]
5. A Highland Wolf Christmas, Sourcebooks Casablanca, Oct 2014 [Couple: Calla Stewart & Guthrie MacNeill]
6. The Wolf Wore Plaid, Sourcebooks Casablanca, April 2021 [Couple: Heather MacNeil & Enrick MacQuarrie]

=== SEAL Wolves ===
1. A SEAL in Wolf's Clothing, Sourcebooks Casablanca, Mar 2012 [Couple: Meara Greymere & Finn Emerson]
2. A SEAL Wolf Christmas, Sourcebooks Casablanca, Oct 2013 [Couple: Anna Johnson & Bjornolf Jorgenson]
3. SEAL Wolf Hunting, Sourcebooks Casablanca, July 2015 [Couple: Lori Greypaw & Paul Cunningham]
4. SEAL Wolf In Too Deep, Sourcebooks Casablanca, Feb 2016 [Couple: Debbie Renaud & Allan Rappaport]
5. SEAL Wolf Undercover, Sourcebooks Casablanca, August 2017 [Couple: Jillian Matthews & Vaughn Greystoke]
6. SEAL Wolf Surrender, Sourcebooks Casablanca, May 2019 [Couple: Natalie Silverton & Brock Greystoke]

==== SEAL Wolf Novellas ====
- SEAL Wolf Pursuit, Sourcebooks Casablanca, Dec 2021 [Couple: Becky Woolworth & Max Browning]

=== Billionaire Wolves ===
1. Billionaire in Wolf's Clothing, Sourcebooks Casablanca, July 2016 [Couple: Jade Ashton & Rafe Denali]
2. A Billionaire Wolf for Christmas, Sourcebooks Casablanca, October 2018 [Couple: Holly Gray & Aidan Denali]
3. Night of the Billionaire Wolf, Sourcebooks Casablanca, May 2020 [Couple: Lexi Summerfield & Ryder Gallagher]
4. Wolf Takes the Lead, Sourcebooks Casablanca, February 7, 2023 [Couple: Kate Hanover & Derek Spencer]

=== Red Wolves ===
1. Seduced by the Wolf, Sourcebooks Casablanca, Aug 2010 [Couple: Cassie Roux & Leidolf Wildhaven]
2. Joy to the Wolves, Sourcebooks Casablanca, Sep 2020 [Couple: Brooke Cerise & Josh Wilding]
3. The Best of Both Wolves, Sourcebooks Casablanca, Jan 2022 [Couple: Sierra Redding & Adam Holmes]
4. Christmas Wolf Surprise, Sourcebooks Casablanca, October 11, 2022 [Couple: Gina Hutton & Maverick Wilding]

=== Highland Wolves of Old ===
1. Wolf Pack, Self Published, Apr 2022 [Couple: Isobel & Alasdair]

== Other Shifters ==
=== Heart of the Jaguar ===
1. Savage Hunger, Sourcebooks Casablanca, Oct 2012 [Couple: Kathleen McKnight & Conner Anderson]
2. Jaguar Fever, Sourcebooks Casablanca, August 2013 [Couple: Maya Anderson & Wade Patterson]
3. Jaguar Hunt, Sourcebooks Casablanca, June 2014 [Couple: Tammy Anderson & David Patterson]
4. Jaguar Pride, Sourcebooks Casablanca, February 2015 [Couple: Melissa Overton & Huntley Anderson]
5. A Very Jaguar Christmas, Sourcebooks Casablanca, October 2016 [Couple: Demetria MacFarlane & Everett Anderson] (Cross-over with the Wolf shifters)
6. The Witch and the Jaguar, Self Published, December 2018 [Couple: Erin Hawkins & Bryce Jenkins] (Novella)
7. You Had Me At Jaguar, Sourcebooks Casablanca, February 2019 [Couple: Valerie Chambers & Howard Armstrong]

==== Novellas ====
- Dawn of the Jaguar, Self Published, Nov 2021 [Couple: Erin Chambers & Jason Biggerstaff]

=== Heart of the Cougar ===
1. Cougar's Mate, Self Published, Mar 2014 [Couple: Shannon Rafferty & Chase Buchanan]
2. Call of the Cougar, Self Published, Nov 2014 [Couple: Tracey Whittington & Hal Haverton]
3. Taming the Wild Cougar, Self Published, Oct 2015 [Couple: Kate Parker & Leyton Hill]
4. Covert Cougar Christmas [Novella], Self Published, Dec 2015 (in the e-book anthology Alphas Unwrapped) [Couple: Bridget Sinclair & Travis MacKay]
5. Double Cougar Trouble, Self Published, Dec 2016 [Couple: Dottie Hamilton & Jack Barrington]
6. Cougar Undercover, Self Published, June 2017 [Couple: Addison Davidson & Dan Steinacker]
7. Cougar Magic, Self Published, October 2018 [Couple: Nina Lamar & Stryker Hill]
8. Cougar Halloween Mischief [Novella], Self Published, October 2019 [Couple: Many Richards & Ricky Jones]
9. Falling for the Cougar, Self Published, November 2019 [Couple: Nicole Welsh & Scott Weekum]
10. Catch the Cougar: A Halloween Novella, Self Published, October 2020 [Couple: Vanessa Vanderbilt & William Rugel]
11. Christmas Cougar Calamity, Self Published, December 2020 [Couple: Jessie Whittington & Emerson Merriweather]
12. You Had Me at Cougar, Self Published, July 2021 [Couple: Ava Lamar & Chet Kensington]
13. Saving the White Cougar, Self Published, Sep 2021 [Couple: Stella White & Ted Weekum]

=== Heart of the Bear ===
1. Loving the White Bear, Self Published, Jan 2017 [Couple: Alicia Raycroft & Rob MacMathan]
2. Claiming the White Bear, Self Published, Jan 2019 [Robyn Conibear & Edward MacMathan]

== Other Series ==
=== Highlanders ===
1. Winning the Highlander's Heart, Vintage Romance, Aug 2006
2. Accidental Highland Hero, Vintage Romance, Mar 2010
3. Highland Rake, Self Published, Nov 2012
4. Taming the Wild Highlander, Self Published, Mar 2013
5. The Highlander, Self Published, Oct 2013
6. Her Highlander Hero, Self Published, June 2014
7. His Wild Highland Lass, Self Published, Feb 2015 (in the Kiss of the Highlander anthology)
8. The Vikings Highland Lass, Self Published, April 2016
9. Vexing the Highlander, Self Published, November 2016 (in the Enchanting the Highlander anthology]
10. My Highlander, Self Published, 2017

=== Heart of the Huntress ===
1. Killing the Bloodlust, Self Published, Apr 2011
2. Huntress for Hire, Self Published, Mar 2011
3. Forbidden Love, Self Published, Dec 2013
4. Deadly Liaisons, Self Published, Mar 2009
5. Vampire Redemption, Self Published, Mar 2020
6. Primal Desires, Self Published, Feb 2021

== Stand Alone ==
- Exchanging Grooms, Self Published, May 2011
- In the Dead of the Night, Self Published, May 2011
- Marriage, Las Vegas Style, Self Published, July 2011
- Lady Caroline and the Egotistical Earl, Self Published, June 2011
- A Ghost of a Chance at Love, Self Published, Sept, 2011
- Deadly Fortune, Self Published, Oct 2012
- Bound by Danger, Self Published, Jan 2013
- Relative Danger, Self Published, Aug 2013
- Galaxy Warrior, Self Published, Jan 2017
- A United Shifter Force Christmas, Self Published, Apr 2022

== YA Novels ==
=== Magic of Inherian ===
1. Scepter of Salvation, Self Published, Apr 2011
2. The Mage of Monrovia, Self Published, Apr 2011
3. Emerald Isle of Mists, Self Published, Feb 2022

=== World of Fae ===
1. The Dark Fae, Self Published, Oct 2011
2. The Deadly Fae, Self Published, Dec 2011
3. The Winged Fae, Self Published, May 2012
4. The Ancient Fae, Self Published, Sep 2012
5. Dragon Fae, Self Published, Nov 2012
6. Hawk Fae, Self Published, Jan 2014
7. Phantom Fae, Self Published, Jan 2015
8. Golden Fae, Self Published, April 2016
9. Falcon Fae, Self Published, Aug 2017
10. Woodland Fae, Self Published, Dec 2018
11. Angel Fae, Self Published, Nov 2021

=== Dragon Fae ===
1. Orchid, Self Published, TBD

=== Blood Moon ===
1. Kiss of the Vampire, Self Published, Dec 2012
2. Bite of the Vampire, Self Published, TBA

=== Demon Guardian ===
1. The Trouble with Demons, Self Published, Dec 2013
2. Demon Trouble, Too, Self Published, Dec 2013
3. Demon Hunter, Self Published, January 2018

=== The Vampire Chronicles ===
1. The Vampire...In My Dreams, Samhain, Aug 2008

=== World of Elves ===
1. Shadow Elf, Self Published, June 2011
2. Darkland Elves, Self Published, November 2018

=== Stand Alone ===
- Courtly Masquerade, Self Published, Apr 2011
- Ghostly Liaisons, Self Published, Apr 2011
- Deidre's Secret, Self Published, Mar 2013
- The Beast Within, Self Published, Jan 2014
