= George Decker =

22nd Chief of Staff of the United States Army

George H. Decker
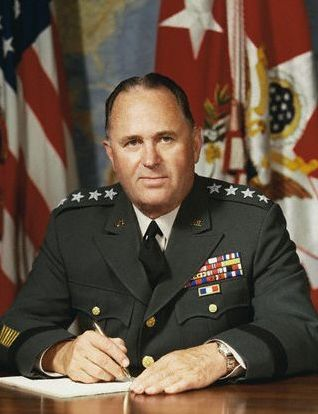
- General Decker in 1960
- Born: February 16, 1902; Catskill, New York, U.S.
- Died: February 6, 1980 (aged 77); Washington, D.C., U.S.
- Military career
- Allegiance: United States
- Branch: United States Army
- Service years: 1924–1962
- Rank: General
- Commands: Chief of Staff of the United States Army; United Nations Command; United States Forces Korea; Eighth United States Army; VII Corps; 5th Infantry Division
- Conflicts: World War II
- Awards: Army Distinguished Service Medal (2); Silver Star; Legion of Merit; Bronze Star Medal

George Henry Decker (16 February 1902 – 6 February 1980) was a general in the United States Army, who served as Chief of Staff of the United States Army from 1960 to 1962.

== Early life ==
Decker was born in Catskill, New York, and attended Lafayette College in Easton, Pennsylvania, receiving an economics degree in 1924. Afterwards he was a trustee of the college from 1964 to 1972. He married the former Helen E. Inman in 1926.

== Military career ==
Decker was commissioned a second lieutenant of infantry in June 1924, and began his army service with the 26th Infantry Regiment, then stationed at Plattsburg Barracks in upstate New York. In 1928, he was sent to Hawaii, where he served with the 35th Infantry Regiment until 1931. He was promoted to first lieutenant in April 1930. After attending advanced infantry training at the Infantry School at Fort Benning in 1932, he remained at Fort Benning with the 29th Infantry Regiment until 1935, followed by service at Vancouver Barracks, near Portland, Oregon, with the 7th Infantry Regiment from 1935 to 1936 (during which time he was promoted to captain, in August 1935).

In 1936, Decker was sent to the Command and General Staff School at Fort Leavenworth, from which he graduated in 1937. Subsequently, he served with the 10th Infantry Regiment at Fort Thomas, Kentucky, and Fort McClellan, Alabama, and the 9th Infantry Regiment at Fort Bragg, North Carolina. In 1940 he took command of Headquarters Company, I Corps, at Fort Jackson, South Carolina, and was assistant supply and logistics officer, 1940–1941. In 1941 came a flurry of promotions: to temporary major (January), permanent major (June), and temporary lieutenant colonel (December). He was sent to Washington, D.C., to serve on the War Department General Staff, where he was assigned to the Office of the Assistant Chief of Staff for Supply. He was promoted to temporary colonel in October 1942 and became deputy chief of staff of the Third Army, Fort Sam Houston, Texas. He was then sent overseas to the Southwest Pacific, where he became deputy chief of staff and then chief of staff of the Sixth Army, a position he held through the end of World War II. He had been promoted to temporary brigadier general in August 1944 and major general in June 1945, and participated in Sixth Army operations in New Guinea, the Solomon Islands and the Philippines.

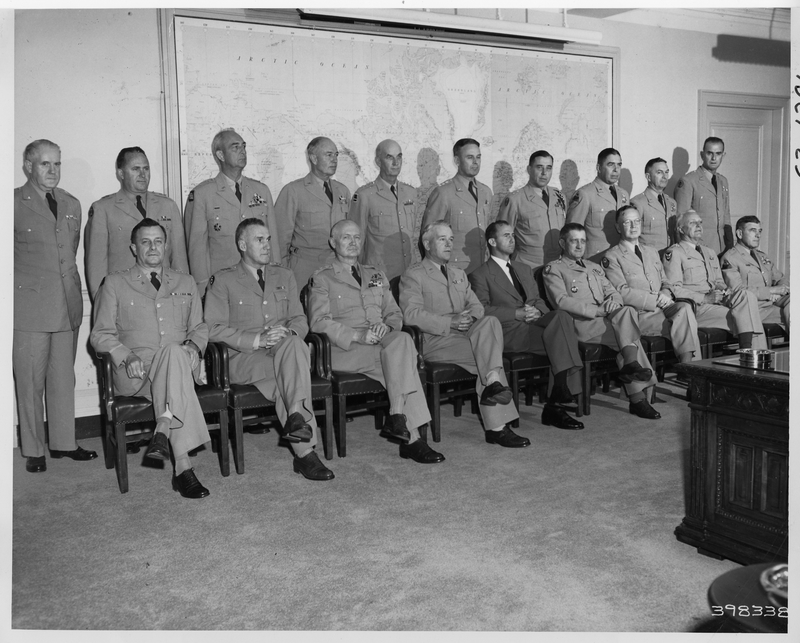
Army commanders in the United States and certain overseas commanders meet with Secretary of the Army Frank Pace and General J. Lawton Collins, Army Chief of Staff, in the Pentagon in routine sessions, June 5, 1952. Major General George Decker is stood second from the left, between Major General Edwin K. Wright (left) and Major General Lester J. Whitlock (right).

Decker returned to Washington in 1946 to Headquarters, Army Ground Forces and Headquarters, Army Service Forces, but soon went back to the Pacific as deputy commanding general and chief of staff of United States Forces, Middle Pacific, Hawaii, from 1946 to 1948.

Decker became commanding general of the 5th Infantry Division in 1948, and in 1950 was assigned to the Office of the Comptroller of the Army as Chief of the Budget Division. Promoted to temporary lieutenant general in 1952, he became Comptroller of the United States Army from 1952 to 1955. He was promoted to permanent brigadier general in April 1953 and permanent major general in July 1954. In 1955, he went to Germany as commanding general of VII Corps at Stuttgart, and was promoted to temporary general in May 1956.

From 1956 to 1957, Decker was deputy commander-in-chief of the United States European Command at its headquarters in Rocquencourt, outside Paris, France. From 1957 to 1959 he was commander-in-chief, United Nations Command, and commanding general, United States Forces Korea and Eighth United States Army.

Decker was appointed Vice Chief of Staff of the United States Army in 1959 and on October 1, 1960, became Chief of Staff of the United States Army, serving in that capacity until September 30, 1962. Highlights of Decker's tenure were supervising augmentations to meet the crisis in Berlin (prompted by the construction of the Berlin Wall in 1961), increasing special warfare forces, initiating new divisional and forward depot concepts, and expanding the army to sixteen divisions. Decker retired at the end of his tenure.

== Later life ==
Following his retirement, Decker was president of the Manufacturing Chemists' Association in Washington for the next seven years. He died of leukemia at Walter Reed Army Medical Center on 6 February 1980.

== Awards and decorations ==
- Army Distinguished Service Medal with one oak leaf cluster
- Silver Star
- Legion of Merit
- Bronze Star Medal
- American Defense Service Medal
- American Campaign Medal
- Asiatic-Pacific Campaign Medal with four campaign stars
- Army of Occupation Medal with "ASIA" clasp
- National Defense Service Medal with oak leaf cluster
- Distinguished Service Star (Philippines)
- Philippine Presidential Unit Citation
- Philippine Liberation Medal with three stars
- Philippine Independence Medal

The President of the United States of America, authorized by Act of Congress, July 9, 1913, has awarded the Distinguished Service Medal (First Oak Leaf Cluster) to General George H. Decker, United States Army, for exceptionally meritorious service in positions of great responsibility: "General Decker distinguished himself by his exemplary performance in command and staff positions of great trust and responsibility, culminating in his service as Chief of Staff, United States Army, during the period from July 1943 to September 1962. Few men have been chosen to carry such heavy responsibility in the United States Army and none has done so more loyally, faithfully or with greater distinction. As a commander of each of the major combat organizations of the U.S. Army, and as deputy commander and commander in chief of major combined allied forces, General Decker has contributed materially to strengthening the defenses of the free world. He was directly responsible for training thousands of soldiers for active combat service in Korea and for the defense of Europe. Through his personal leadership, soldiers who served under his command were instilled with an unusually keen sense of patriotism and with the skill and the will to fight successfully against a formidable and ruthless enemy. Later, in higher commands, his wisdom, great moral strength, and confident determination were personal qualities that were recognized and respected by American and allied officers and soldiers who served with him. These qualities contributed in great measure to the development of the superb combat capabilities of the Eighth Army, the largest operational field army in the free world. As Army Budget Officer, and later as Comptroller of the Army, General Decker introduced many far reaching improvements into the Army financial management system, including the performance budget, the stock fund, and a new integrated accounting system, contributing to an efficient and rapid increase in the Army's combat capabilities. As the professional head of the Army, General Decker demonstrated an unusual degree of imagination, versatility, and prescience in leading the Army through a most difficult and demanding period of expansion to meet world-wide crises. Under his skillful direction, the Army expanded from a force less than 860,000 officers and men to a strength of over a million; a partial mobilization of Army reserve components was accomplished; the combat units of the Army in Europe were brought up to strength in personnel and equipment; a major reorganization of the Army was undertaken; a new and flexible divisional structure, designed to meet the demands of modern war, was developed; the Army's over-ali strength in combat-ready divisions was increased from eleven to sixteen; its capabilities for conducting special warfare and for training and supporting allies in counter insurgency operations were greatly augmented; and the rate of Army materiel modernization was nearly doubled. General Decker's objectivity, tact and diplomacy, coupled with his extraordinarily good judgment, have served to win for him the admiration and respect of all with whom he has worked. His exceptional leadership has been characterized by a calm and competent judgment and demeanor; by dedication and loyalty to superiors and to subordinates alike; by an eminent sense of fairness, understanding, and consideration in contacts with others; and by the highest standards of performance of duty. He has invariably inspired the officers and men under his command to function collectively as an efficient team and to fulfill their individual responsibilities with distinction. General Decker's outstanding achievements as Chief of Staff and his entire career are in keeping with the finest traditions of the United States Army, and reflect the highest credit upon himself and upon the military service."

== Dates of rank ==
Second Lieutenant, Regular Army: 15 June 1924
First Lieutenant, Regular Army: 6 April 1930
Captain, Regular Army: 1 August 1935
Major, Army of the United States: 31 January 1941
Major, Regular Army: 15 June 1941
Lieutenant Colonel, Army of the United States: 24 December 1941
Colonel, Army of the United States: 1 October 1942
Brigadier General, Army of the United States: 14 August 1944
Major General, Army of the United States: 7 June 1945
Lieutenant Colonel, Regular Army: 15 June 1947
Colonel, Regular Army: 10 June 1948
Lieutenant General, Army of the United States: 10 June 1952
Brigadier General, Regular Army: 24 April 1953
Major General, Regular Army: 12 July 1954
General, Army of the United States: 31 May 1956
General, Regular Army, Retired List: 30 September 1962

Military offices
Preceded by Lyman Lemnitzer	Vice Chief of Staff of the United States Army; 1959–1960	Succeeded by Clyde D. Eddleman
Preceded by Lyman Lemnitzer	Chief of Staff of the United States Army; 1960–1962	Succeeded by Earle G. Wheeler
