= Warren Ault =

American historian (1887–1989)

- Born: Warren Ortman Ault; January 8, 1887
- Died: May 14, 1989 (aged 102)
- Education: Baker University; Jesus College, Oxford; Yale University
- Occupation: Historian

Warren Ortman Ault (January 8, 1887 – May 14, 1989) was an American historian, who taught at Boston University from 1913 to 1957.

== Life ==
Ault graduated from Baker University in 1907, before studying at Jesus College, Oxford, as a Rhodes Scholar. While a student at Baker, he was a member of the local Zeta Chi fraternity. He then obtained a doctorate in Medieval English history from Yale University in 1919, having served as a second lieutenant in the artillery in the First World War. He taught history at Boston University from 1913 to 1957, becoming William Edwards Huntington professor. He became an Honorary Fellow of Jesus College, Oxford in 1971. He was elected a Fellow of the American Academy of Arts and Sciences in 1941.
