= James E. Beasley Sr. =

American lawyer (1926–2004)

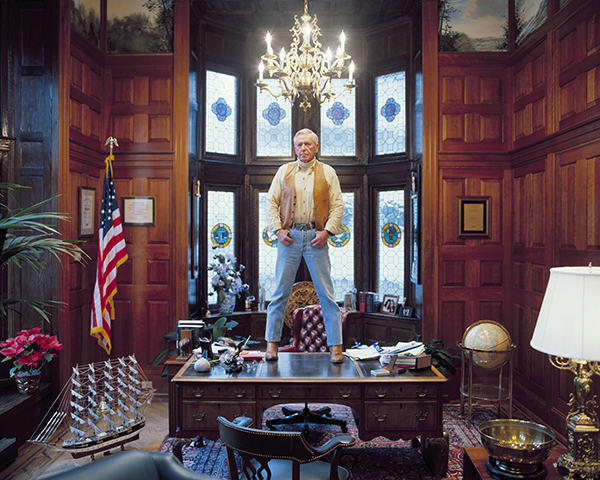
James E. Beasley Sr. - Trial Lawyer

James E. Beasley Sr. (1926 – September 18, 2004) was an American plaintiffs' trial lawyer.

Beasley "was widely considered one of Philadelphia's best trial lawyers, with a commanding courtroom style and a flamboyant personality to match," and was once photographed for a Philadelphia magazine profile "standing atop his desk wearing a suit, a cowboy hat and boots." Described as "legendary," Beasley was known for his intense work ethic and for winning "multimillion-dollar verdicts with regularity." Beasley "outshone opposing attorneys, wrestled control of the courtroom away from presiding judges, and ran roughshod to victories." Lynne Abraham, the district attorney of Philadelphia (1991 - 2010), called Beasley "Philadelphia’s version of the king of torts."

Beasley was also known as a major benefactor of Temple University. The Temple University Beasley School of Law is named for him.

Beasley's life story was chronicled by journalist and former client Ralph Cipriano in the 2008 biography Courtroom Cowboy.

== Early life, military service, and education ==
Beasley was born to a working-class family in West Philadelphia. His father died when Beasley was 14, and to support his family he dropped his high school and altered his birth certificate in order to join the Navy although he was underage. Beasley served on a submarine during World War II.

Upon returning to America, Beasley worked as a commercial driver, driving trucks, cabs, and buses, and worked briefly as a motorcycle police officer in Florida. Beasley finished his high school degree while working full-time.

Beasley then enrolled at Temple University in Philadelphia under the G.I. Bill. Beasley graduated in 1953, in just two and a half years. During college, Beasley served as an ROTC cadet regimental commander, played for the Temple Owls football team, and worked part-time at a restaurant. He also was elected to the Scabbard and Blade honor society.

Beasley then enrolled at Temple University School of Law. While in law school, he clerked for Judge John W. Lord Jr. of the U.S. District Court for the Eastern District of Pennsylvania.

== Career ==
After graduating from law school in 1956, Beasley joined the law firm of Richter, Lord & Levy, where he practiced personal injury law.

Later, Beasley established his own firm, Beasley, Casey, Colleran, Erbstein, Thistle & Kline, now known as The Beasley Firm. Beasley became nationally known for his success as a trial lawyer in medical malpractice, products liability, defamation, personal injury, and aviation cases. He tried over 400 cases during his career and won more than 100 jury verdicts in excess of $1 million. Beasley was known for his many complex cases, including some that involved important issues of justice and public policy. Among his most significant wins was a $105 million verdict he won for families of individuals killed in the World Trade Center attacks on September 11, 2001, against Osama bin Laden and Saddam Hussein. Beasley wrote a number of legal handbooks and articles during his career. He taught trial techniques at Temple Law from 1976 to 1980.

Beasley served on several boards and committees. He served as president of the Philadelphia Trial Lawyers Association and the Pennsylvania Trial Lawyers Association, and served as chairman of the Pennsylvania Supreme Court Committee on Standard Jury Instruction (Civil). Beasley also served as a judge pro tem of the Court of Common Pleas of Philadelphia County.

Beasley received a number of awards and honors during his career, including the Michael A. Musmanno Award of the Philadelphia Trial Lawyers Association, the Temple University Law School Outstanding Alumni Award, and the Temple University General Alumni Association Certificate of Honor. He was a diplomate of the American Board of Professional Liability Attorneys, a fellow of the International Academy of Science and Law, a member of the Inner Circle of Advocates.

Beasley died on September 18, 2004, at age 78, of complications of lymphoma, at the Hospital of the University of Pennsylvania, only thirteen days after being diagnosed with cancer. After Beasley's death, his son took over the firm.

== Personal life ==
Beasley's hobby was aviation and formation aerobatics; he was an owner and pilot of several fighter aircraft, including a Russian MiG and two P-51D Mustangs. Beasley was an FAA-certified flight instructor, a member of the Six Diamonds Aerobatic Flight Team, and a National Air Racing Group qualified professional race pilot.

Beasley was known as a quiet and generous philanthropist who frequently made anonymous gifts, including many scholarships for college students. He was a major benefactor of Temple University. He gave the largest gift in Temple University history to the Temple University School of Law; while the exact amount of the gift was undisclosed at Beasley's request, it was reported later to be $20 million. The law school was renamed in Beasley's honor in 1999.

Beasley was described by friends and associates "as a shy but demanding man with a marvelous sense of humor, boundless energy and unequivocal integrity." Richard A. Sprague, another prominent Philadelphia trial lawyer, said of Beasley's reputation, "he was the sun around which we planets revolved."

Beasley was married three times. His first marriage was to Gloria Beasley, with whom he had two children, Nancy Beasley and Lynn Hayes. In 1958, he married Helen Beasley, with whom he had three children, James E. Beasley Jr., Pamela J. Beasley, and Kimberly Beasley Schmucki. They divorced in 1984 but remarried in 2003, about a year before his death. Beasley had reconciled with Helen after they had been separated for 18 years, and the remarriage took place three years later.

After Beasley's death, an "ugly dispute ... erupted" among Beasley's five children on the division of his $55 million estate, with competing claims from his two daughters by his first marriage versus his two daughters from his second marriage in a battle over the handling of his $55 million estate. The sisters from Beasley's first marriage accused Beasley's son James Beasley Jr. of mismanaging the estate.
