= John Taylor Lewis =

United States Army general

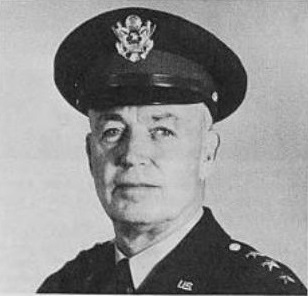
- From the December 1953 edition of The Aircraft Flash magazine
- Born: October 28, 1894; Rockford, Illinois, United States
- Died: December 5, 1983 (aged 89); San Diego, California, United States
- Military career
- Allegiance: United States
- Branch: United States Army
- Service years: 1917–1954
- Rank: Lieutenant General
- Service number: 0-7000
- Conflicts: World War I World War II; Cold War
- Awards: Army Distinguished Service Medal (3)

John Taylor Lewis (October 28, 1894 – December 5, 1983) was a lieutenant general in the United States Army.

== Biography ==
Lewis was born in Rockford, Illinois, on October 28, 1894.

In 1917 he received a bachelor's degree in architectural engineering from the University of Illinois, was commissioned as a second lieutenant in the Coast Artillery, and was assigned to the 37th Infantry Regiment in Laredo, Texas.

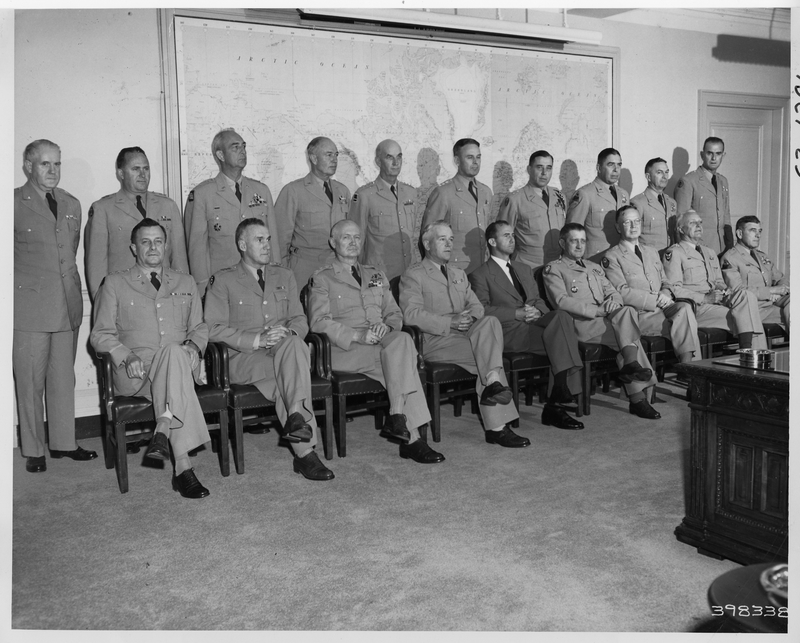
Army commanders in the United States and certain overseas commanders meet with Secretary of the Army Frank Pace and General J. Lawton Collins, Army Chief of Staff, in the Pentagon in routine sessions, June 5, 1952. Major General John T. Cole is stood fourth from the left, between Major General Lester J. Whitlock (left) and Major General Horace L. McBride (right).

During World War I he served in France. After the war he remained in France as a military attaché at the U.S. Embassy in Paris. In the 1920s he was assigned as an instructor at the Fort Monroe, Virginia Coast Artillery School. In the early 1930s Lewis served as a member of the Coast Artillery Board at Fort Monroe. In 1933 he began attendance at the Army Command and General Staff College, from which he graduated in 1935. In 1938 Lewis graduated from the Army War College.

From 1940 to 1941 he served in the Office of the Chief of Coast Artillery, first as Chief of the Material & Finance Section and then as Chief of the Fiscal Section. In 1941 he was appointed Secretary of the War Department General Staff as a brigadier general. From February 1942 to May 1942 Lewis commanded the 38th Coast Artillery Brigade (Anti-Aircraft) and was assigned as the Commander of the Washington Military District, receiving promotion to major general. In 1942 he was a member of the military panel that tried and convicted German saboteurs who were captured after entering the United States with a plan to attack military targets. He was succeeded by Charles F. Thompson as commander of the Military District of Washington in 1944, after which he headed the Supreme Headquarters Allied Expeditionary Forces (SHAEF) mission to the French government from 1944 to 1945.

Lewis was commander of Fort Riley, Kansas from 1948 to 1950. In 1952 he was appointed to head Army Anti-Aircraft Command (ARAACOM) and promoted to lieutenant general, remaining in this position until his 1954 retirement.

General Lewis died in San Diego, California, on December 5, 1983.

== Awards and honors ==
His decorations included three awards of the Distinguished Service Medal.

Citation for First Distinguished Service Medal:

The direct wording of the award is as follows: "For exceptionally meritorious and distinguished services to the Government of the United States, in a duty of great responsibility, as commanding General, Military District of Washington, from May 1942 to September 1944. Despite unusual difficulties arising through the impact in one area of the various chains of command, General Lewis developed a harmonious and efficient command and provided for the sound and adequate defense of the Nation's Capital, effectively integrating the many diverse military and naval elements stationed in the vicinity of Washington. Facing an administrative situation of multiple complexities, he provided for the effective operations of the headquarters of the Army during a critical period when the armed forces of the Nation were being deployed in combat throughout the world. In accomplishing his tactical and administrative responsibilities in a highly efficient manner, he maintained close relationships with the civil government, planned and supervised the construction of needed recreational facilities and housing, and provided for the many diverse administrative and supply services for the Military District of Washington, and all War Department activities within the command. Through his devotion to duty, his superior leadership and his rare administrative ability, he has contributed materially to the war effort."

Name: Lewis, John T. Service: Army Rank: Major General Order: War Department, General Orders No. 88 (1944)
