= Joseph Bondy =

American politician

Joseph Bondy (September 13, 1863 – December 21, 1945) was a Jewish-American lawyer, politician, and military officer from New York.

== Life ==
Bondy was born on September 13, 1863, in Syracuse, New York, the son of Austrian immigrants Gabriel Bondy and Mary Cohen. His father served in the Austrian Army for around eight years and worked with A. C. Yates & Co. in Syracuse for thirty years. He graduated from Syracuse High School in 1881.

In 1884, Bondy graduated from Columbia University with a B.A. and Columbia Law School with an LL.B. He was admitted to the bar in 1885, and had a private law practice until 1917. He was a town supervisor of Onondaga County from 1885 to 1889. He initially studied law in the office of Costello & Ide, and then with Frank Hopkins of Syracuse. After practicing law alone for a year, he formed a partnership with Hopkins under the firm name Hopkins & Bondy. In 1895, Bondy was elected to the New York State Assembly as a Republican, representing the Onondaga County 3rd District. He served in the Assembly in 1896 (when he introduced legislation to amend the Civil Code with regard to will probates, create a state printing house, provide support for railway employees injured in accidents, amend the Game Law with regard to the sale of game, and amend the Syracuse city charter), 1897, and 1898.

Bondy served in the Spanish–American War. He offered to serve in the military again when America entered World War I in 1917. Already in his fifties, he was commissioned a major in the construction department of the Quartermaster Corps. After the war, he helped organize patriotic and military organizations, including the American Legion in New York from 1920 to 1922, the Reserve Officers Association in New York in 1923 (serving as its secretary until 1930), the 98th Infantry Division of the United States Army in 1924 (working with Willis Uline to form the Division), the Citizens' Military Training Camp for the Second Corps Area (New York, New Jersey, and Delaware) from 1923 to 1930, and a Reserve Officers Training Camp in Syracuse University. He also gave annual prizes to high school students for enlisting volunteers in the training camps for eight years and lectured the soldiers in the camps on constitutional history for six years. He was commissioned a colonel in 1925, and in 1927, he retired from the military He wrote Travel and Progress: Why the National Defense Act? in 1922, How Religious Liberty was Written into the American Constitution in 1927, and historical brief against President Franklin D. Roosevelt's court-packing plan in 1937.

Bondy was a member of the American Legion, the Spanish-American War Veterans, the Military Order of the World War, the Reserve Officers Association, Scabbard and Blade, the Onondaga County Bar Association, the Grange, and the Onondaga Yacht Club. In 1892, he married Frances Elias. Their daughter, Arline Rose, married Irving J. Davis.

Bondy died in Syracuse Memorial Hospital on December 21, 1945.

New York State Assembly
Preceded by Levi S. Chapman	New York State Assembly; Onondaga County, 3rd District; 1896–1898	Succeeded by Edward B. Sabine
