= Lester J. Whitlock =

U.S. Army major general

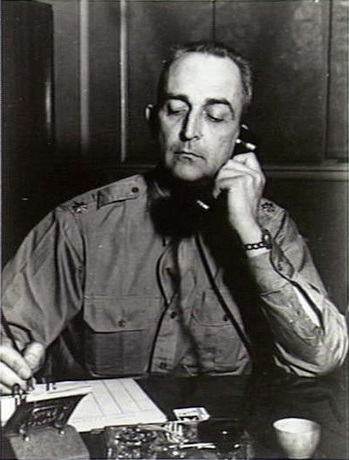
- Whitlock as a lieutenant colonel in Australia during World War II
- Born: October 27, 1892; Piqua, Ohio, U.S.
- Died: October 18, 1971 (aged 78); Miami, Florida, U.S.
- Burial place: Arlington National Cemetery
- Alma mater: Miami University of Ohio
- Spouse(s): Anna Dee Nichols (m. 1924–1947, her death); Mildred Boatman Finley (m. 1950–1971, his death)
- Children: 1
- Military career
- Allegiance: United States
- Branch: United States Army
- Service years: 1916–1917 (National Guard); 1917–1954 (Army)
- Rank: Sergeant (National Guard); Major General (Army)
- Service number: 0-7138
- Unit: U.S. Army Field Artillery Branch
- Commands: Civilian Conservation Corps Camp, Sulphur Springs, Texas; Arizona District, Civilian Conservation Corps; San Antonio General Depot; 10th Mountain Division; Fort Riley and the Army General School; U.S. Army Caribbean Command
- Conflicts: Pancho Villa Expedition; World War I American Forces in Germany; World War II; Occupation of Japan
- Awards: Army Distinguished Service Medal (2); Legion of Merit (4)

Lester J. Whitlock (October 27, 1892 – October 18, 1971) was a career officer in the United States Army. A veteran of World War I and World War II, he attained the rank of major general and was most notable for his post-World War II service as commander of the 10th Mountain Division and U.S. Army Caribbean Command.

A native of Piqua, Ohio, Whitlock graduated from Miami University in 1914 and served in the Ohio National Guard while planning to apply for a commission in the United States Army. He served on the Mexico–United States border during the Pancho Villa Expedition, and in 1917 completed officer training and received appointment as a second lieutenant of Field Artillery. During World War I and the post-war American Forces in Germany, Whitlock managed transportation at the Brest, France, port of embarkation.

During World War II, Whitlock served as General Douglas MacArthur's assistant chief of staff for logistics (G-4) as MacArthur successively commanded U.S. Army Forces in the Far East, South West Pacific Area, and U.S. Army Forces Pacific. After the war, Whitlock remained as MacArthur's G-4 during MacArthur's assignment as Supreme Commander for the Allied Powers during the Occupation of Japan.

After returning to the United States, Whitlock commanded the San Antonio (Texas) General Depot, 10th Mountain Division, Fort Riley and the Army General School, and U.S. Army Caribbean Command. He retired in November 1954, and his decorations included two awards of the Army Distinguished Service Medal and four awards of the Legion of Merit. In retirement, Whitlock was a resident of Coral Gables, Florida. He died in Miami on October 18, 1971, and was buried at Arlington National Cemetery.

== Early life ==
Lester Johnson Whitlock was born in Piqua, Ohio, on October 27, 1892, the son of Nora M. (Gilbert) Whitlock and Horace E. Whitlock. He was educated in Piqua and graduated from Piqua Central High School in 1910. Whitlock attended Oxford, Ohio's Miami University, from which he received a A.B. degree in 1914. While in college, Whitlock became a member of the Beta Theta Pi fraternity.

After completing his education, Whitlock worked for Goodyear Tire and Rubber in Akron and joined the Ohio National Guard's Battery B, 1st Field Artillery Regiment with the intention of obtaining a commission in the United States Army. He served until August 1917, and took part in his unit's activation for service on the Mexico–United States border during the Pancho Villa Expedition. During his National Guard service, Whitlock was promoted to corporal and sergeant.

== World War I ==
In July 1917, Whitlock completed the Citizens' Military Training Camp held at Fort Sheridan, Illinois, and applied for an army commission. He was accepted, and in August he received appointment as a second lieutenant of Field Artillery.

Whitlock was assigned to the 2nd Field Artillery Regiment for World War I and completed training with his unit at Camp Fremont, California. The 2nd Field Artillery was part of the 8th Division's 8th Field Artillery Brigade. The division did not deploy to France as a unit; some components went overseas as part of American Expeditionary Force, Siberia and some were recalled before arriving in Europe and demobilized. The 2nd Field Artillery was part of an 8th Division contingent that went to France in late summer 1918, where they constructed and managed the Allied port of embarkation in Brest. Whitlock remained in France after the war as railway transportation officer for soldiers assigned to American Forces in Germany, and assisted them in returning to the United States for demobilization. During the war, Whitlock was promoted to first lieutenant and captain.

== Post-World War I ==
After the war, Whitlock was assigned to the 5th Field Artillery Regiment and posted to Fort Bragg, North Carolina. In 1922, he was assigned to Fort Sill, Oklahoma, as a student at the Field Artillery School's Battery Officers' Course. He graduated from the course in 1923, after which he was assigned as assistant professor of military science for the Reserve Officers' Training Corps at the University of Oklahoma. While in this assignment, Whitlock became a member of the Scabbard and Blade society. In addition to his R.O.T.C. duties, Whitlock engaged in other initiatives, including leading a horseback riding course for female students.

Whitlock's subsequent assignments included the 7th Field Artillery Regiment at Madison Barracks, New York, and inspector and instructor for the Field Artillery units of the New York National Guard. In the early 1930s, he served as commander of the Civilian Conservation Corps camp at Sulphur Springs, Texas.

In the fall of 1933, Whitlock planned and oversaw construction of CCC camps at Papago Park and Tonto National Forest in Arizona. In 1935, he oversaw construction of CCC drought relief camps in Texas at Big Bend National Park, Big Spring State Park, Hereford Park, and Balmorhea State Park. In May 1935, Whitlock was appointed commander of the CCC's Arizona district. He was promoted to major in August 1935.

In 1937, Whitlock began attendance at the United States Army Command and General Staff College, and he graduated in 1938. After graduating, Whitlock served in Washington, D.C., as a member of the War Department's staff. He was promoted to lieutenant colonel in September 1940.

== World War II ==
In mid-1941, Whitlock was assigned as assistant chief of staff for logistics (G-4) on the staff of U.S. Army Forces in the Far East, the command formed to defend the Philippines following the Japanese invasion. Whitlock was promoted to colonel in December 1941. When commander Douglas MacArthur escaped to Australia and formed the South West Pacific Area command headquarters, Whitlock continued to serve as his G-4.

As MacArthur and his staff planned the New Guinea Campaign and follow on operations against the Japanese, Whitlock was commended for making use of assistance from individuals with expertise in oil production, shipping, and other areas of importance. Some of these individuals offered their advice as civilians, while several, including Hanford MacNider, received commissions in the army. In June 1942, Whitlock received promotion to brigadier general.

In January 1945, Whitlock received promotion to temporary major general. In anticipation of an invasion of Japan, in April 1945 MacArthur was named to head U.S. Army Forces Pacific, and Whitlock was again assigned as his G-4. After the Surrender of Japan on August 15, 1945, Whitlock was among the U.S. conferees who met with their Japanese counterparts in Manila to negotiate the terms of Japan's formal capitulation. When the Japanese signed the Instrument of Surrender aboard USS Missouri on September 2, Whitlock was among those on hand to witness the ceremony.

== Post-World War II ==
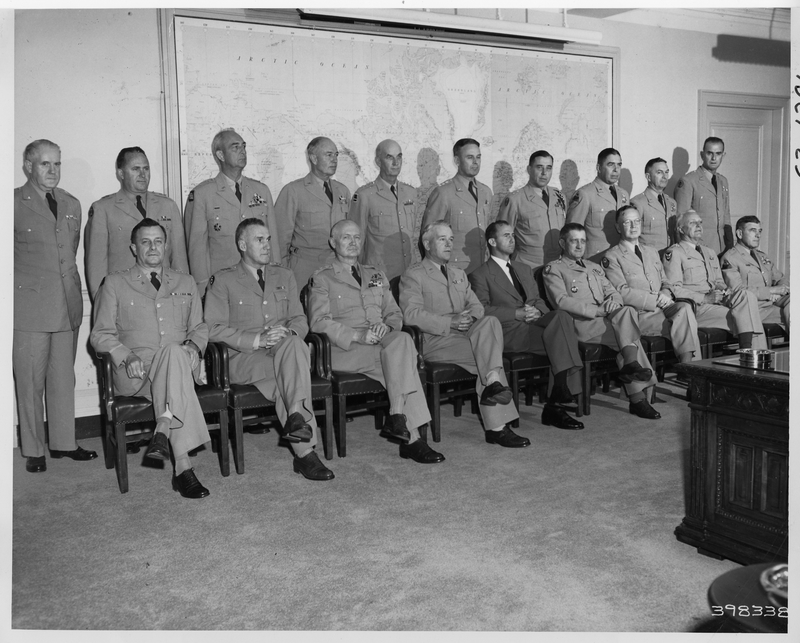
Army commanders meet with Secretary of the Army Frank Pace and General J. Lawton Collins, Army Chief of Staff, at the Pentagon, June 5, 1952. Whitlock stands third from the left, between George Decker (left) and John T. Lewis (right).

After the war, Whitlock returned to the permanent rank of brigadier general. During the post-war Occupation of Japan, MacArthur was appointed as Supreme Commander for the Allied Powers, and Whitlock continued to serve as his G-4. In August 1947, Whitlock returned to the United States and assumed command of the San Antonio General Depot in Texas.

In December 1947, Whitlock was again promoted to major general. In August 1948, the 10th Mountain Division was reactivated to provide basic training to draftees at Fort Riley, Kansas, and Whitlock was named to command it.

Whitlock was assigned as commander of Fort Riley and the post's Army General School in October 1950. The AGS offered several courses for which Whitlock was responsible, including Officer Candidate School. From November 1951 to November 1954, Whitlock commanded U.S. Army Caribbean Command, based at Fort Amador, Panama. He retired in November 1954.

== Awards ==
Whitlock's awards included the Army Distinguished Service Medal (2) and the Legion of Merit (4). In addition, he was a recipient of the Order of the British Empire (Honorary Commander) and the Philippine Distinguished Service Star.

== Retirement and death ==
In retirement, Whitlock was a resident of Coral Gables, Florida. He died in Miami on October 18, 1971. Whitlock was buried at Arlington National Cemetery.

== Family ==
In July 1924, Whitlock married Anna Dee Nichols, with whom he was the father of daughter Ann Helen Whitlock. Anna Whitlock died in 1947, and in 1950, Whitlock married Mildred Boatman Finley, who died two months after him.
