= George W. F. Cook =

American politician (1919–2009)

United States Attorney for the District of Vermont
- In office 1981–1987
- Preceded by: Jerome O'Neill
- Succeeded by: George J. Terwilliger III
- In office 1969–1977
- Preceded by: William B. Gray
- Succeeded by: Jerome O'Neill

President pro tempore of the Vermont Senate
- In office 1965–1969
- Preceded by: John H. Boylan
- Succeeded by: Edward G. Janeway

Member of the Vermont Senate from Rutland County
- In office 1959–1969 Serving with Asa S. Bloomer, Harold M. Brown, William J. Burke (1959–1965); William J. Burke, Ellery R. Purdy (1965–1967); Ellery R. Purdy, Jim Jeffords (1967–1969)
- Preceded by: Asa S. Bloomer, Harold M. Brown, William J. Burke, Orin A. Thomas Sr.
- Succeeded by: Sanborn Partridge, Robert E. West, Ellery R. Purdy, Andrew L. Orzel

Personal details
- Born: May 19, 1919 Shrewsbury, Vermont, U.S.
- Died: September 26, 2009 (aged 90) Rutland, Vermont, U.S.
- Resting place: Laurel Glen Cemetery, Cuttingsville, Vermont, U.S.
- Party: Republican
- Spouse: Laicita Gregg (m. 1947)
- Children: 5
- Education: Middlebury College; Columbia University Law School; Georgetown University Law School
- Profession: Attorney

George W. F. Cook (May 20, 1919 – September 26, 2009) was a Vermont attorney and politician who served as President of the Vermont State Senate and United States Attorney for the District of Vermont.

== Biography ==
George Wallace Foster Cook was born in Shrewsbury, Vermont on May 20, 1919. Named for an uncle who died in World War I, he graduated from Middlebury College in 1940 and became an aeronautical engineer at Pratt & Whitney in Hartford, Connecticut.

Cook joined the United States Army Air Forces for World War II and served as a navigator.

After the war Cook enrolled at Columbia University Law School, where he received his law degree in 1948. From 1948 to 1955 he was an attorney for the United States Department of the Navy, and he earned a master's degree from Georgetown University Law School in 1952.

In 1955 Cook relocated to Shrewsbury and became a partner in a Rutland law firm. In 1958 he was elected to the Vermont State Senate, and he served five terms, 1959 to 1969. Cook served as Chairman of the Judiciary Committee from 1963 to 1969 and President pro tem from 1965 to 1969. During his Senate service Cook was a leader in passing legislation that removed billboards from Vermont's roadsides.

Cook was also a Delegate to the Republican National Conventions in 1964 and 1968.

In 1969 Cook was appointed to succeed Joseph F. Radigan as United States Attorney for Vermont by President Richard M. Nixon, and he held the office until 1977.

From 1978 to 1981 Cook served as a United States magistrate judge for the District of Vermont. In 1981 he was reappointed United States Attorney by President Ronald Reagan, and succeeded William B. Gray. He served until retiring in 1986.

Cook died in Rutland on September 26, 2009 and was buried in Cuttingsville's Laurel Glen Cemetery.

Political offices
Preceded by John H. Boylan	President pro tempore of the Vermont State Senate; 1965–1969	Succeeded by Edward G. Janeway
Legal offices
Preceded by Joseph F. Radigan	United States Attorney for the District of Vermont; 1969–1977	Succeeded by William B. Gray
Preceded by Jerome O'Neill	United States Attorney for the District of Vermont; 1981–1987	Succeeded by George J. Terwilliger III
