= William B. Gray =

American attorney and politician

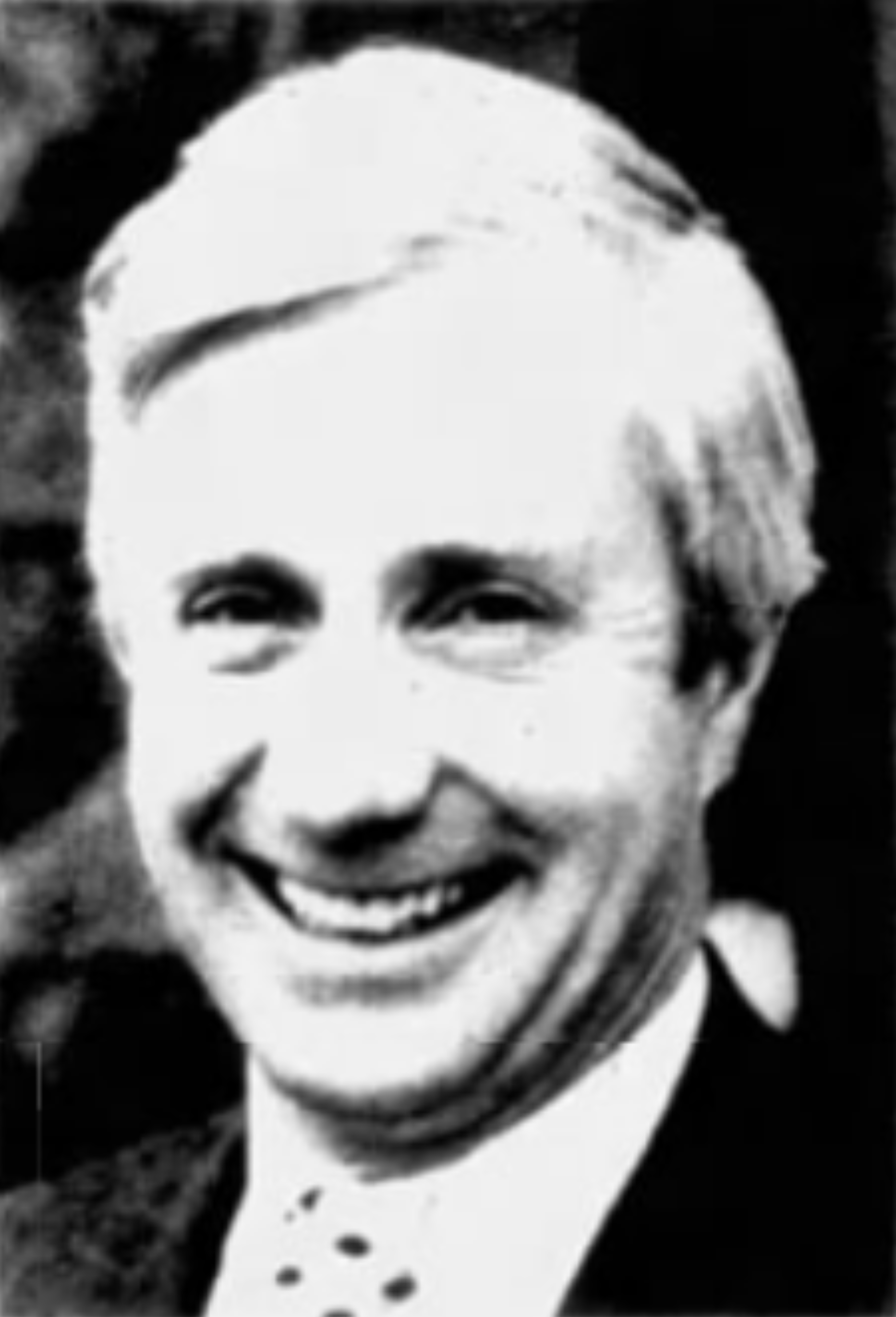
- Gray in 1988

United States Attorney for the District of Vermont
- In office 1977–1981
- Appointed by: Jimmy Carter
- Preceded by: George W. F. Cook
- Succeeded by: Jerome O'Neill

Director of the Executive Office for United States Attorneys
- In office 1975–1977
- Preceded by: Gerald D. Fines
- Succeeded by: William P. Tyson

Personal details
- Born: February 14, 1942 Brattleboro, Vermont, U.S.
- Died: March 22, 1994 (aged 52) Boston, Massachusetts, U.S.
- Resting place: West Hill Cemetery, Putney, Vermont
- Spouse: Sarah Kerlin (m. 1965-1994, his death)
- Relations: Bob Gray (brother); Molly Gray (niece)
- Children: 2
- Education: Harvard College; University of Pennsylvania Law School
- Occupation: Attorney; Public official

William B. Gray (February 14, 1942 – March 22, 1994) was an American attorney and political figure from Vermont. He is best known for his service as United States Attorney for the District of Vermont from 1977 to 1981, managing the successful 1986 reelection campaign of U.S. Senator Patrick Leahy, and running unsuccessfully for the U.S. Senate against Republican Jim Jeffords in 1988.

== Early life ==
William Barton Gray was born in Brattleboro, Vermont, on February 14, 1942, the son of Edwin and Mabel Gray. His father managed buildings and grounds maintenance at the Putney School, and his mother ran the school's kitchen. Gray's siblings included Olympic skier Bob Gray.

He was raised in Putney, Vermont, and attended the Putney School, from which he graduated in 1960. He then attended Harvard College, from which he received his Bachelor of Arts degree in 1964. While at Harvard, Gray was a member of the Hasty Pudding Club and the Krokodiloes. In 1967, Gray received his law degree from the University of Pennsylvania Law School and attained admission to the bar.

In addition to pursuing a legal career, Gray was an amateur singer, and during his years as a prosecutor in New York City his musical activities included performing as an extra in La bohème with the Metropolitan Opera and performing with the New York Choral Society. After returning to Vermont, he became a member of Burlington's Musica Propria choral group. He was also an avid cross-country skier, bicyclist, and runner, and took part in several marathons.

== Start of career ==
From 1967 to 1968, Gray was a law clerk in the office of federal judge Sterry R. Waterman. From 1968 to 1972 he was an Assistant United States Attorney for the Southern District of New York. From 1972 to 1975, Gray was an Assistant U.S. Attorney for the District of Vermont. In 1975, he was appointed an Associate Deputy U.S. Attorney General and Director of the Executive Office for United States Attorneys.

== United States Attorney ==
In 1977, Gray left the director's position to become United States Attorney for the District of Vermont during the presidential administration of Jimmy Carter. He served until the end of Carter's administration in 1981 and was succeeded by Jerome O'Neill.

Among the notable prosecutions Gray handled as U.S. Attorney was the controversial 1978 case of Kristina Berster, who had been arrested at the U.S.-Canada border in Vermont and was accused by the government in West Germany of being a member of the Red Army Faction terrorist group. Berster faced an eight-count indictment for passport violations and illegally crossing the border. No links to terrorism were proved, but there were allegations of illegal surveillance and false testimony made against U.S. law enforcement agencies. Berster was convicted of three felonies and two misdemeanors. She was sentenced to nine months in prison, all but two weeks of which she had served while awaiting trial. Charges against her in West Germany were dismissed, and she returned home after finishing her American sentence.

Gray also prosecuted Gerald Bull, an engineer and weapons designer who operated Space Research Corporation of North Troy. Bull and a colleague were convicted of illegally selling arms to South Africa in 1980 and served prison sentences.

== Continued career ==
In 1981, Gray began to practice law in Vermont as a partner in the Burlington firm of Sheehey, Blue, Gray & Furlong. In 1986 he left the practice of law to volunteer as the campaign manager for Democratic U.S. Senator Patrick Leahy. Leahy was elected to a third term, defeating the Republican nominee, former Governor Richard Snelling in the general election.

In 1988, Gray won the Democratic nomination for the U.S. Senate seat being vacated by the retiring Robert Stafford. In the general election, Gray was defeated by the Republican nominee, Jim Jeffords.

In 1991, Gray served as chairman of the Vermont Bicentennial Commission, which was created to organize celebrations and activities commemorating Vermont's 1791 admission to the Union as the 14th state. He was also a board of directors member for the Vermont Council on the Arts, the Flynn Theater for the Performing Arts, the Putney School, and the Visiting Nurse Association of Chittenden and Grand Isle Counties.

In 1993, Leahy and Jeffords recommended Gray to serve as a judge on the United States Court of Appeals for the Second Circuit, the same seat once held by Sterry Waterman. Gray's nomination was still pending at the time of his death.

== Death and burial ==
Gray resided on a farm in Jericho and practiced law until he was diagnosed with leukemia in 1993. In addition to his legal practice, he raised sheep, kept bees, and grew Christmas trees and apples. He died on March 22, 1994, while undergoing treatment at Brigham and Women's Hospital in Boston, Massachusetts. He was buried at West Hill Cemetery in Putney, Vermont.

== Family ==
In 1965, Gray married Sarah Kerlin of Riverdale, Bronx, New York. They were the parents of son Joshua Barton Gray and daughter Sarah Hawkes Gray. Gray's niece, Molly Gray, was elected lieutenant governor of Vermont in 2020.

== Sources ==
=== Internet ===
- "Class of 1964 Obituaries: William Barton Gray". HR 1964.org. Cambridge, MA: Harvard-Radcliffe Class of 1964. 1994.
- Leahy, Patrick (May 4, 1994). "Tribute to William Barton Gray". Congressional Record Online. U.S., Government Printing Office.
- Leahy, Patrick (April 11, 2016). "Statement of Senator Patrick Leahy On The Unstoppable Bob Gray". Leahy.Senate.gov. Office of U.S. senator Patrick Leahy. Archived from the original on November 14, 2019.

=== Newspapers ===
- "Several to Go Abroad". Brattleboro Reformer. Brattleboro, VT. June 20, 1964. p. 10 – via Newspapers.com.
- "Engagement Announcement, Sarak Kerlin and William Barton Gray". Brattleboro Reformer. Brattleboro, VT. November 3, 1964. p. 2 – via Newspapers.com.
- "Obituary, William B. Gray". Bradford Journal-Opinion. Bradford, VT. March 30, 1994. p. 6. Archived from the original on March 15, 2022 – via Small Town Papers, Inc.
- Davis, Neil (November 4, 1979). "Desire for Freedom Convinced Berster to Leave". The Burlington Free Press. Burlington, VT. p. 3B – via Newspapers.com.
- Green, Susan (February 24, 2008). "1968: A Year of Turmoil; Spielberg Plans Film of Chicago 7 Trial". The Burlington Free Press. Burlington, VT. p. 3D – via Newspapers.com.
- Bookchin, Debbie (July 17, 1981). "FBI Photographed Berster Advocates During Trial". Barre Montpelier Times Argus. Barre, VT. p. 3 – via Newspapers.com.
- Flanders, Colin (July 29, 2020). "Newcomer Molly Gray's LG Bid Has Gained a Lot of Traction. How?". Vermont Seven Days. Burlington, VT.
- Graff, Christopher (October 5, 1978). "Berster Jury Nearly Complete". The Burlington Free Press. Burlington, VT. Associated Press. p. B-1 – via Newspapers.com.
- Polumbaum, Judy (February 8, 1979). "Judge Sentences Kristina Berster". Rutland Herald. Rutland, VT. p. 12 – via Newspapers.com.
- Treaster, Joseph B. (July 1, 1978). "Baader-Meinhof Suspect Is Seized". The New York Times. New York, NY. p. A-7 – via TimesMachine.

Party political offices
Preceded by James A. Guest	Democratic nominee for U.S. Senator from Vermont (Class 1); 1988	Succeeded by Jan Backus
