= George J. Terwilliger III =

26th United States Deputy Attorney General (born 1950)

George Terwilliger
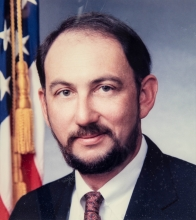

United States Attorney General Acting
- In office January 20, 1993
- President: Bill Clinton
- Deputy: Vacant
- Preceded by: William Barr
- Succeeded by: Stuart M. Gerson (acting)

26th United States Deputy Attorney General
- In office November 26, 1991 – January 20, 1993
- President: George H. W. Bush
- Preceded by: William Barr
- Succeeded by: Philip Heymann

United States Attorney for the District of Vermont
- In office 1987–1991
- President: Ronald Reagan; George H. W. Bush
- Preceded by: George Cook
- Succeeded by: Charles Caruso

Personal details
- Born: George James Terwilliger III; June 5, 1950 (age 76) New Brunswick, New Jersey, U.S.
- Party: Republican
- Spouse: Carol Hitchings
- Children: 3, including Zachary
- Education: Seton Hall University (BA); Antioch School of Law (JD)

George James Terwilliger III (born June 5, 1950) is an American lawyer and public official. Since January 2024, he has been serving as an attorney and counsel at Terwilliger Law PLLC in Washington, D.C., continuing to represent clients on a selective basis, and prior to that, he served as a partner in the Washington, D.C. office of McGuireWoods LLP, where he served as head of the firm's Crisis Response practice and co-head of its white collar team from January 2015 to January 2024. Terwilliger, of Vermont, was nominated on February 14, 1992, by President George H. W. Bush to be United States Deputy Attorney General at the United States Department of Justice (DOJ). He succeeded William Barr. As United States Deputy Attorney General, Terwilliger became the second-highest-ranking official in the United States Department of Justice (DOJ) and ran the day-to-day operations of the department, serving in that position from 1991 through 1993. He was appointed to the position by President George H.W. Bush after serving as the United States Attorney for the District of Vermont, appointed by President Reagan. He also served as acting United States Attorney General in his capacity as United States Deputy Attorney General following the resignation of William Barr as the 77th United States Attorney General Terwilliger resigned at noon on January 20, 1993, pursuant to 28 U.S.C. § 508.

== Early and family life ==
Terwilliger was born June 5, 1950, in New Brunswick, New Jersey. He grew up in Metuchen, N.J., went to public school, graduated from Seton Hall University (B.A., 1973) with a degree in Communications and Antioch School of Law (J.D., 1978). Married, Terwilliger has three children and three grandchildren, and resides in Delaplane, Virginia, where he operates the family farm, Pleasant Vale Farm, and manages other business interests. His father, George J. Terwilliger, Jr., was a civil engineer and Navy veteran with combat experience in the Pacific in World War II. His mother, Ruth Terwilliger, was a librarian and worked in real estate sales.

== Career ==
=== Early government service ===
After admission to the bar, Terwilliger served as Assistant U.S. Attorney for the District of Columbia (1978–81) and an Assistant U.S. Attorney for the District of Vermont (1981–87) and then became U.S. Attorney for Vermont (1987-1991) and later Deputy U.S. Attorney General (1991–93) in the George H. W. Bush administration. Terwilliger was on a small prosecutor team that managed the initial response to the initial response to the shooting of President Reagan. Terwilliger specialized in white-collar crime and terrorism.In 1987, Terwilliger prosecuted three men in a terrorism case involving a bomb smuggled into the US in Vermont. In 1993, Terwilliger briefly took the helm of the Justice Department as acting attorney general after the departure of former Attorney General William Barr.

=== Iran-Contra ===
Terwilliger commented on the Iran–Contra affair in a February 6, 2001 appearance on a CNN titled "Burden of Proof: Ronald Reagan's Legal Legacy".

=== 2000 Florida recount ===
During the Florida 2000 election recount, Terwilliger was co-leader of Republican President-elect George W. Bush's legal team and was "an advisor to the Bush-Cheney Transition and counselor to designated cabinet and other prospective appointees."

In June 2001, Bush administration spokesman Ari Fleischer was asked in a White House press briefing whether Terwilliger was a leading candidate to head the Federal Bureau of Investigation.

=== Private legal practice ===
Rather than return to government service, in 2003, Terwilliger co-founded the 527 committee "Americans for a Better Country" with Frank J. Donatelli, former Ronald Reagan White House political director and secretary and treasurer of the Young America's Foundation, and Craig Shirley, president and CEO of Shirley & Banister Public Affairs.

In April 2007 Terwilliger served as a panelist for the Brookings Institution Judicial Issues Forum entitled "Politics and the Justice Department: Finding a Path to Accountability". Attorney General Alberto R. Gonzales resigned August 27, 2007, and left office on September 17, 2007. On October 10, 2007, news outlets reported that Gonzales hired Terwilliger "to represent him in investigations of mismanagement" of the U.S. Department of Justice. "Investigators are look[ing] into allegations that Gonzales lied to lawmakers and illegally allowed politics to influence hiring and firing at the department." Terwilliger represented Gonzales through several Inspector General investigations and a subsequent criminal investigation by a special prosecutor. Gonzales was exonerated in all matters.

In 2008, the American Bar Association mentioned Terwilliger as a leading candidate for Attorney General under a John McCain presidency. It related that while in the USDOJ during the Reagan Administration, Terwilliger dealt with resolving matters such as investigating BCCI after an international banking scandal and investigating after the savings and loan scandal, environmental cases, antitrust merger reviews and enforcement matters, civil rights and voting cases as well as terrorism and national security cases. Terwilliger was also in charge of all Justice Department operations, including crisis response, such as the 1992 Los Angeles riots. On policy matters, he was a principal in the highest councils of government charged with addressing the broad array of legal policy issues arising in the executive branch.

From January 2015 to January 2024, Terwilliger served as a partner of the McGuireWoods US-based international law firm. Since January 2024, he has been serving as an attorney and counsel at Terwilliger Law PLLC in Washington, D.C., continuing to represent clients on a selective basis.

=== Current high-profile work ===
Terwilliger successfully defended former U.S. Congressman Aaron Schock, indicted in 2016 after resigning from his legislative position. In March 2017, Terwilliger and his colleagues publicized the involvement of a former Schock staffer who acted as a confidential informant in the case after the indictment.

He also represents Mark Meadows, former White House Chief of Staff to President Donald Trump, with regard to the investigation of the January 6 attack on the U.S. Capitol by a Select Committee of the U.S. House of Representatives. Terwilliger counseled Meadows through multiple investigations and litigation, none of which resulted in any determination of Meadows wrongdoing.

As a veteran of Department of Justice and other US agency policies and practices, Terwilliger is called upon by the media and by congressional committees for his views on criminal justice and national security policy matters.

== Affiliations ==
- Counsel, National Gambling Impact Study Commission (1997)
- Legal Advisory Council, National Legal Center for the Public Interest
- Washington Legal Foundation
- American Bar Association

Legal offices
Preceded by George Cook	United States Attorney for the District of Vermont; 1987–1991	Succeeded by Charles Caruso
Preceded by William Barr	United States Deputy Attorney General; 1991–1993	Succeeded by Philip Heymann
Preceded by William Barr	United States Attorney General; Acting; 1993	Succeeded by Stuart M. Gerson; Acting
