= Jerome O'Neill =

American lawyer (1946–2023)

- O'Neill in 2010

United States Attorney for the District of Vermont
- In office May 15, 1981 – October 4, 1981
- Preceded by: William B. Gray
- Succeeded by: George W. F. Cook

Personal details
- Born: September 24, 1946 Burlington, Vermont, U.S.
- Died: December 3, 2023 (aged 77) Burlington, Vermont, U.S.
- Relations: Lieutenant General Edward J. O'Neill (uncle)
- Children: Maura O'Neill and Kate O'Neill
- Education: Georgetown University (B.S., J.D.)
- Profession: Attorney

Military service
- Service: United States Army
- Years of service: 1971–1972
- Rank: First Lieutenant
- Unit: Judge Advocate General's Corps

Jerome F. O'Neill (September 24, 1946 – December 3, 2023) was an American attorney from the state of Vermont. He is most notable for his service as an Assistant U.S. Attorney for Vermont (1973–1975), First Assistant U.S. Attorney (1975–1981), and United States Attorney (1981).

== Early life ==
Jerome F. O'Neill was born in Burlington, Vermont, on September 24, 1946, a son of Phyllis (Chagnon) O'Neill and Frederick A. O'Neill, a United States Army officer and inspector for the Immigration and Naturalization Service. O'Neill's relatives included his uncle Edward J. O'Neill, a lieutenant general in the U.S. Army. O'Neill was raised in Swanton and attended St. Anne's Academy, from which he graduated in 1964.

O'Neill began attendance at Georgetown University in the fall of 1964, and he received his Bachelor of Science in foreign trade in 1968. While in college, O'Neill took part in the Reserve Officers' Training Corps program and served as secretary of the Scabbard and Blade Society.

After college, O'Neill began attendance at Georgetown University Law Center, from which he received his Juris Doctor in 1971. He was admitted to the barin the District of Columbia in 1971. O'Neill served in the U.S. Army from 1971 to 1972 and attained the rank of first lieutenant.

== Career ==
After his military service, O'Neill was a law clerk in 1972 for Judge Sylvia Bacon of the Superior Court of the District of Columbia. From 1972 to 1973, he was a law clerk for Judge Albert Wheeler Coffrin of the U.S. District Court for Vermont.

In 1973, O'Neill was appointed an Assistant U.S. Attorney for the Vermont District Court and was based in Rutland. In 1975, he was promoted to First Assistant U.S. Attorney, and in 1976 he relocated to Burlington to establish the U.S. Attorney's office there. He served as first assistant until May 1981, when he was appointed to succeed William B. Gray as United States Attorney for the District of Vermont. He served until October, and was succeeded by George W. F. Cook.

After leaving the U.S. Attorney's office, O'Neill resided in Burlington and practiced law as the senior partner of the Burlington firm that included Geoffrey W. Crawford and eventually became O’Neill, Kellner & Green. He subsequently became of counsel at Burlington's Gravel & Shea.

== Death ==
O'Neill died from cancer on December 3, 2023, at the age of 77.
