= Charles Janeway =

Immunologist

- Born: February 5, 1943; Boston, Massachusetts, U.S.
- Died: April 12, 2003 (aged 60); New Haven, Connecticut, U.S.
- Education: Harvard University (BA, MD)
- Known for: Studies of Innate immunity
- Spouse: H. Kim Bottomly
- Children: 3
- Scientific career
- Fields: Immunology
- Workplaces: Yale University

Charles Alderson Janeway, Jr. (February 5, 1943 – April 12, 2003) was an American immunologist who helped create the modern field of innate immunity. A member of the National Academy of Sciences, he held a faculty position at Yale University's Medical School and was an Howard Hughes Medical Institute Investigator.

== Early life and education ==
Born in Boston on February 5, 1943, to Charles A. and Elizabeth B. Janeway, Charles Janeway was raised in Weston, Massachusetts. He was educated at Phillips Exeter Academy in New Hampshire, and Harvard College, where he graduated summa cum laude in 1963 with a bachelor's degree in chemistry. His interest in medicine was inspired by his parents: his father Charles Alderson Janeway was physician-in-chief at Boston Children's Hospital from 1946 to 1974 and his mother was a social worker at the Boston Lying-In Hospital.

By earning his medical degree from Harvard Medical School in 1969, Janeway joined a long family line of prominent physicians. In addition to his father, his grandfather, Theodore C. Janeway, was the first full-time professor of medicine at the Johns Hopkins University School of Medicine, and his great-grandfather, Edward G. Janeway, was the Commissioner of Health of the City of New York.

== Career ==
Janeway trained in basic-science research with Hugh McDevitt at Harvard, John Humphrey at the National Institute for Medical Research in England, and with Robin Coombs at Cambridge University in England. He completed an internal medicine internship at the Peter Bent Brigham Hospital in Boston. Following five years of immunology research at the National Institutes of Health in Bethesda, Md., under William E. Paul, and two years at Uppsala University in Sweden under Hans Wigzell, he joined the faculty of Yale University in 1977. In 1983, he was promoted to Professor of Pathology. In 1998, he was a founding member of the Section of Immunobiology at Yale University School of Medicine.

Janeway was one of the leading immunologists of his generation, studying the innate immune system and the biology of T cells. In 1989, he predicted that activation of the adaptive immune response is controlled by the more ancient innate immune system recognizing patterns of pathogens.

Janeway made fundamental contributions to many other areas of immunology, including co-discovery of bacterial superantigens. Together with Alexander Rudensky, Janeway also characterized how self antigens associate with MHC class II molecules.

Janeway is particularly well known as the lead author of Immunobiology, a standard textbook on immunology. Since the 2008 publishing of its seventh edition, it has been renamed as Janeway's Immunobiology in his memory. He also published more than 300 scientific papers.

Janeway also served on the board of directors of several research institutes, including the Trudeau Institute, and the Federation of American Societies for Experimental Biology. He was president of the American Association of Immunologists from 1997 to 1998.

Janeway was married to H. Kim Bottomly, Ph.D., and had three daughters: Katherine A. Janeway, M.D., Hannah H. Janeway, M.D., and Megan G. Janeway, M.D. He died of B-cell lymphoma on April 12, 2003, in his home in New Haven, Connecticut.

== Awards ==
- 1991 Bohmfalk Teaching Award, Yale University
- 2001 American Association of Immunologists Lifetime Achievement Award
- 2002 German Society for Immunology Avery-Landsteiner Award
- 2003 Cancer Research Institute William B. Coley Award
