= Bob Gray (cross-country skier) =

American cross-country skier (born 1939)

Personal information
- Born: April 25, 1939 (age 87) Brattleboro, Vermont, United States

Sport
- Sport: Cross-country skiing

Bob Gray (born April 25, 1939) is an American former cross-country skier. He competed at the 1968 Winter Olympics and the 1972 Winter Olympics.

Gray's siblings included William B. Gray, who served as United States Attorney for Vermont. His daughter, Molly Gray, served as lieutenant governor of Vermont from 2021-2023.
