= Bobby Towns =

American athlete (1938–2015)

No. 7, 34
- Position: Defensive back

Personal information
- Born: March 17, 1938; Elberton, Georgia, U.S.
- Died: February 10, 2015 (aged 76); Athens, Georgia, U.S.
- Listed height: 6 ft 1 in (1.85 m)
- Listed weight: 180 lb (82 kg)

Career information
- High school: Athens (GA)
- College: Georgia
- NFL draft: 1960: 11th round, 122nd overall pick
- AFL draft: 1960

Career history
- St. Louis Cardinals (1960); Boston Patriots (1961)
- Stats at Pro Football Reference

Robert Forrest Towns (March 17, 1938 – February 10, 2015) was an American football player and track and field athlete.

== Life ==
Born in Elberton, Georgia, Robert "Bobby" Towns was the son of Forrest Towns and Martha Elizabeth Eberhardt. Towns grew up in Athens, Georgia, where he played football in high school. He went on to play football at the University of Georgia (UGA) from 1957–1959 and professionally with the St. Louis Cardinals and the Boston Patriots.

Towns' athletic career began at Athens High School, where he played football and was recruited to run the hurdles on the track team. His ability allowed him to be a starter for the UGA Bulldogs in his sophomore year.

Towns graduated from UGA with BBA and MBA degrees and was the Distinguished Military Graduate, a member of Omicron Delta Kappa, Scabbard and Blade, Georgia Football Lettermen's Club, "G" Club, Gridiron Secret Society, and Who's Who in American Colleges and Universities. He lettered in football and track, and in 1959 was notable as the SEC leader in receptions and receiving yards, and sixth in receiving touchdowns. After graduation, he was selected in the eleventh round of the 1960 NFL draft by the St. Louis Cardinals where he played four games, then played two games for the Boston Patriots in 1961 before ending his professional football career. Following his football career, he maintained his connection to the sport by officiating SEC football for 30 years.

== Death ==
After professional football, Towns worked for and retired from AFLAC and retired from the U.S. Army at the rank of colonel. He also became active in numerous hereditary and lineage organizations and was the Historian General of the National Society, Sons of the American Revolution. On February 10, 2015, he died in Athens, Georgia at the age of 76.
