= Zeta Chi =

Collegiate fraternity at Baker University in Kansas, US

- ΖΧ
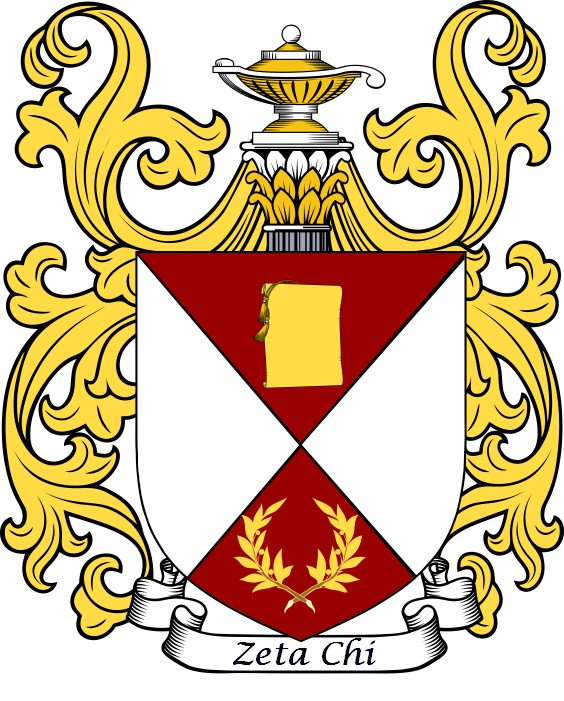
- Founded: 1905; 121 years ago Baker University
- Type: Social
- Affiliation: Independent
- Status: Active
- Scope: Local
- Colors: Crimson and Gold
- Flower: Golden Chrysanthemum
- Jewel: Blood Red Ruby
- Philanthropy: Baldwin City Food Bank
- Chapters: 1
- Headquarters: 903 Eighth Street; Baldwin, Kansas; United States
- Website: www.zeta-chi.org

Zeta Chi (ΖΧ) is a fraternity located at Baker University in Baldwin City, Kansas. It is the oldest independent fraternity in the western United States.

== History ==
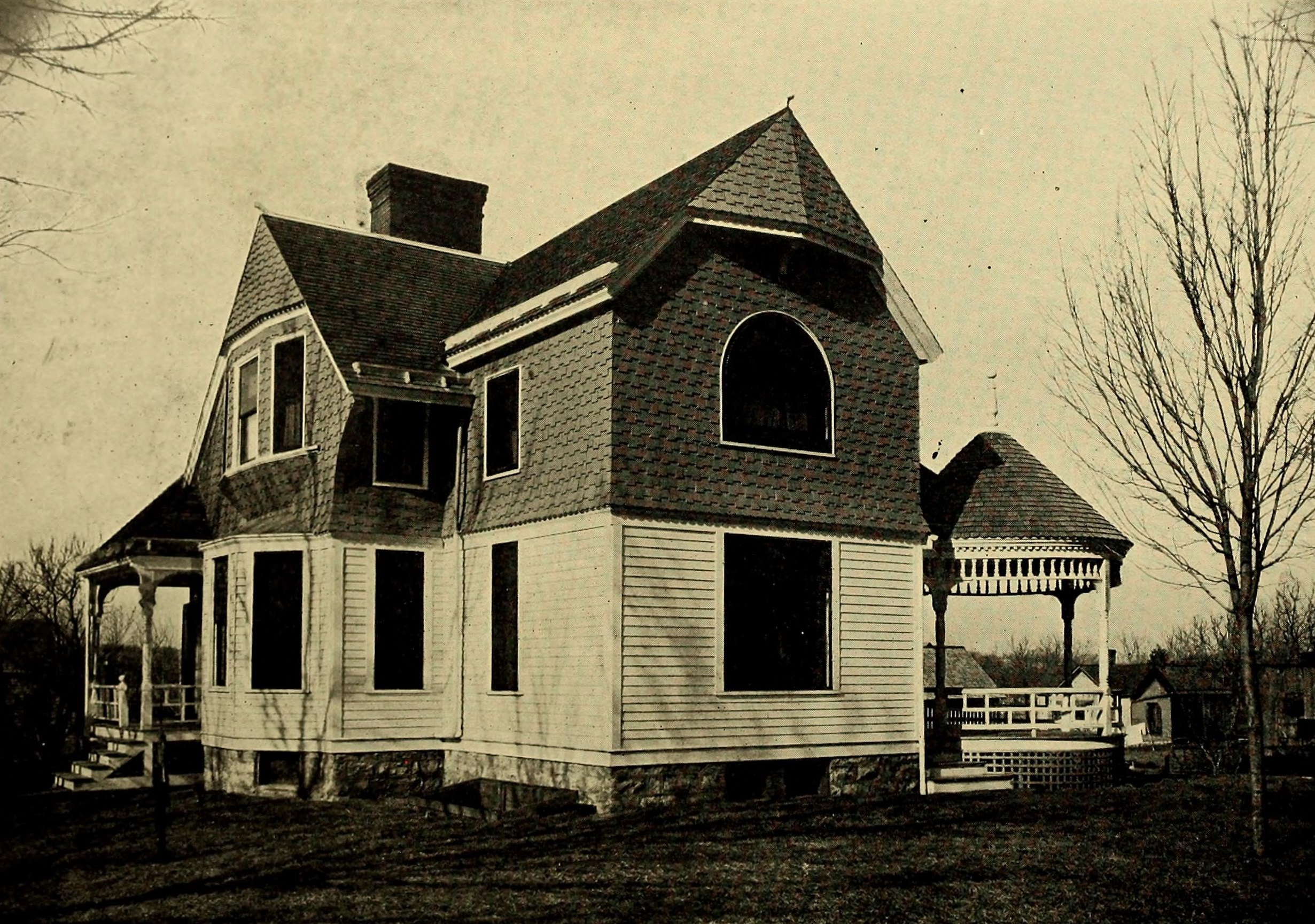
The Zeta Chi chapter house pictured in 1906.

Zeta Chi was founded on May 23, 1905 by 16 men who did not wish to join any of the previously existing fraternities at Baker University. By 1915 it reported 79 living undergraduate and alumni members.

Throughout the 20th Century the fraternity grew, eventually moving to its current headquarters on 903 Eighth Street, which was previously the house of the University President. During a 1911 visit to campus, President William Howard Taft stayed at the house belonging Professor William Markham which later became the Zeta Chi house.

In the mid 2000s the fraternity struggled with small pledge classes and repeated academic probation. To help alleviate these problems, in 2007 Zeta Chi officially became a "dry" house (not allowing alcohol on its property).

== Symbols ==
Zeta Chi's colors are crimson and gold. its flower is the golden chrysanthemum. Its jewel is the blood-red rub.

== Philanthropy ==
Originally, Zeta Chi was philanthropically affiliated with the Special Olympics, raising money for local chapters and spreading awareness of their activities. Most prominent among the member's activities is their annual Polyeuphany event, a benefit concert in which students and community members share their talents to raise money.

== Notable members ==
- TaRon Graham, musician
- Warren Ortman Ault, historian
- Jared J. Grantham, nephrologist
- Raymond Pruitt, cardiologist

== See also ==
- List of social fraternities
