= Janeway Children's Health and Rehabilitation Centre =

Geography
- Location: 300 Prince Philip Drive, St. John's, Newfoundland and Labrador, Canada
- Coordinates: 47.572776°N 52.742701°W

Organization
- Care system: Public Medicare (Canada)
- Type: Specialist
- Affiliated university: Memorial University of Newfoundland

Services
- Emergency department: Yes (acute, subacute and ambulatory care)
- Beds: 80
- Speciality: Children's hospital, Pediatric Rehabilitation hospital Teaching hospital

History
- Founded: 1966

Links
- Website: www.janewayfoundation.nf.ca
- Lists: Hospitals in Canada

The Janeway Children's Health and Rehabilitation Centre is a children's hospital located in St. John's, Newfoundland and Labrador, Canada.

== Overview ==
The Janeway is the only children's hospital in the province and functions, in partnership with Health Sciences Centre, as a teaching hospital for the Memorial University of Newfoundland Faculty of Medicine under the direction of NL Health Services.

The facility was founded as the Dr. Charles Alderson Janeway Child Health Centre in 1966, using the former base hospital on the recently closed Pepperrell Air Force Base in the east end of the city. It was named after Charles Alderson Janeway, a pediatrician who is credited with helping to establish the hospital. The name of the facility was modified to its present form in 2001 when a new facility was opened as an annex of the Health Sciences Centre. Demolition of the old facility located in the former Pepperrel AFB started in September 2008 by Kelloway Construction, hired by the provincial government at a cost of $924,129. Clean-up of the site was completed in 2010, and in September 2015, a new long-term care facility named "Pleasant View Towers" was opened on Newfoundland Drive.

== Services ==
The Janeway Children's Health and Rehabilitation Centre includes:

- 42 Acute Care Medical Surgical beds
- 7 Acute care psychiatry beds
- 25 Neonatal Intensive Care beds
- 6 Pediatric Care Intensive Care beds
- 3 Operating rooms
- Extensive Rehabilitation Centre
- Diagnostic Treatment Services
- Outpatient Services
- Outreach Programs in Diabetes, Asthma, Cystic Fibrosis, and Hemophilia
- Pediatric Emergency Department
- Therapeutic Pool
- therapeutic play garden
- Janeway Hospital School, operated by the English School District

== See also ==
- Kevin Chan
- List of children's hospitals
