= Margaret Janeway =

American physician

- Margaret Janeway in 1938
- Born: May 3, 1896; Trenton, New Jersey, U.S.
- Died: November 17, 1981 (aged 85); New York City, U.S.
- Occupation: Physician
- Spouse: John Davidson McLanahan (m. 1948; died 1969)

Margaret Janeway McLanahan (May 3, 1896 – November 17, 1981) was an American physician who served in World War II. The New York Times described her as "the first woman doctor in the United States Army in the North African theatre".

== Early life and education ==
Janeway was born in Trenton, New Jersey, the daughter of John Howell Janeway and Margaret (Meta) McAllister Janeway. Her father was a mining engineer. Her paternal grandfather was John H. Janeway, a Union Army surgeon in the United States Civil War. Her maternal grandfather was also an army surgeon. She attended Bryn Mawr College and earned her medical degree from the Columbia University College of Physicians and Surgeons in 1927.

== Career ==
Janeway practiced medicine in New York City. From 1942 to 1943, she held the rank of Lieutenant in the Women's Army Corps, stationed at Fort Des Moines, Iowa. From 1943 to 1947, Janeway was based in Algiers while she served with the United States Army Medical Corps in North Africa, one of the first American women doctors commissioned overseas during World War II. The New York Times described her as "the first woman doctor in the United States Army in the North African theatre". She held the rank of Major, and had charge of an 25-bed hospital.

After the war, Janeway was on the staff at Lenox Hill Hospital, was a consultant with the Veterans' Administration on the medical needs of women veterans, and was an appointed medical representative on the New York State Industrial Council.

== Personal life ==
Janeway married banker John Davidson McLanahan in 1948. He died in 1969. She died in 1981, at the age of 85, at her home in New York City.
