= John H. Boylan =

American politician

John H. Boylan (July 12, 1907 – February 14, 1981) was a politician who served as President of the Vermont Senate.

== Biography ==
John Henry Boylan was born in North Stratford, New Hampshire on July 12, 1907. He was raised and educated in Brighton, Vermont, and was employed as a general storekeeper (matériel manager) for the Central Vermont, Canadian National and Grand Trunk railroads.

During World War II, Boylan served in the Navy Reserves as a Storekeeper. He joined the navy on March 26, 1942, and reported aboard the USS Elizabeth C. Stanton (AP-69) on September 17, 1942.

A Republican, Boylan served in several local offices, including selectman and school board member. He was a member of the Vermont Fish and Game Commission and the Vermont Labor Relations Board.

Boylan served in the Vermont House of Representatives from 1951 to 1953. He served in the Vermont Senate from 1955 to 1965 and was Senate President from 1963 to 1965.

In 1964 Boylan was an unsuccessful candidate for lieutenant governor, losing the Republican primary to Richard Snelling.

In 1970 Boylan was returned to the Vermont Senate, and he served four terms, 1971 to 1979.

Boylan's wife Lena served as Essex County Probate Judge.

Boylan died in Island Pond, Vermont on February 14, 1981. He was buried at Lakeside Cemetery in Island Pond.

Political offices
Preceded by Asa S. Bloomer	President pro tempore of the Vermont State Senate; 1963 – 1965	Succeeded by George W. F. Cook
