= Edward Gamaliel Janeway =

American physician (1841–1911)

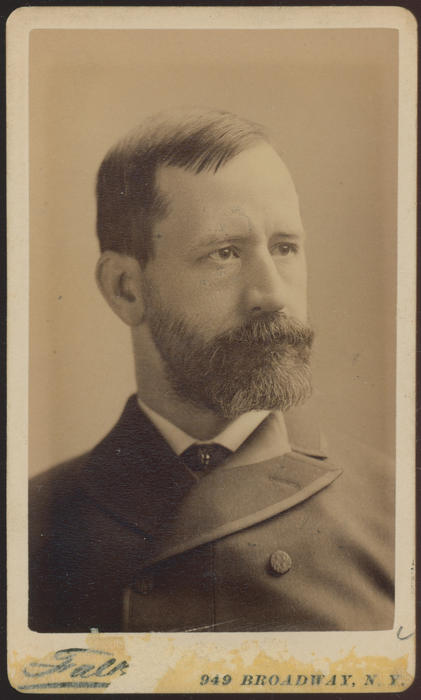

Health Commissioner of New York
- In office 1875–1882

Personal details
- Born: August 31, 1841
- Died: February 10, 1911
- Education: Rutgers College; College of Physicians and Surgeons in New York
- Occupation: physician; professor at Bellevue Hospital Medical College

Military service
- Branch/service: US Army Hospital
- Rank: medical cadet

Edward Gamaliel Janeway (August 31, 1841 – February 10, 1911) was an American physician who served as Health Commissioner of New York, and as president of the New York Medical Journal Association in the late nineteenth century. He was considered "one of America's premier internists in the late nineteenth and early twentieth centuries".

== Biography ==
Edward Janeway was born near New Brunswick, New Jersey, August 31, 1841. He graduated from Rutgers College in 1860, receiving the degree of B.A. and M.A. from that institution. In 1864 he was graduated from the College of Physicians and Surgeons in New York, receiving the degree of M.D. While in the medical school in the years 1862 and 1863, he was made acting medical cadet in the United States Army hospitals at Newark, New Jersey. After graduation he worked at the Blackwell Island Smallpox Hospital before starting at Bellevue Hospital.

In 1872, he became professor of pathology and practical anatomy in Bellevue Hospital Medical College. From 1868 to 1871 he was visiting physician to Charity Hospital. He later became visiting and consulting physician to other hospitals in the city, including Mount Sinai, St. Luke's, and the French Hospital.

In 1874 he was vice-president of the New York Pathological Society. From 1875 till 1882, he was Health Commissioner of New York. In 1876 he was president of the New York Medical Journal Association; his principal contributions to medical literature appear in the medical journals of New York. He was one of the founders of the Association of American Physicians in 1886. Also in 1886, he assumed the post of Chair of Internal Medicine at the Bellevue Hospital Medical College; he continued in that role until 1892. When the College merged with the New York University School of Medicine in 1898, he became its clinical director. He was president of the Academy of Medicine in 1897 and 1898 and a trustee from 1899 until 1903.

Later in life, the degree of LL.D. was conferred upon him, by Rutgers in 1898, by Columbia in 1904, and by Princeton in 1907. He died in Summit, New Jersey, on February 10, 1911.

He is most famously known for describing non-tender lesions on the palms or soles of individuals with endocarditis; these physical exam findings were later called Janeway lesions in his honor. His son, Theodore Caldwell Janeway was the first full-time professor of medicine at the Johns Hopkins University School of Medicine. His grandson Charles Alderson Janeway was an eminent American pediatrician, medical professor, and clinical researcher. His great-grandson, Charles Alderson Janeway, Jr. was a prominent immunologist and member of the National Academy of Sciences. Another grandson, Edward G. Janeway, was President of the Vermont Senate.
