= Theodore Caldwell Janeway =

American medical professor

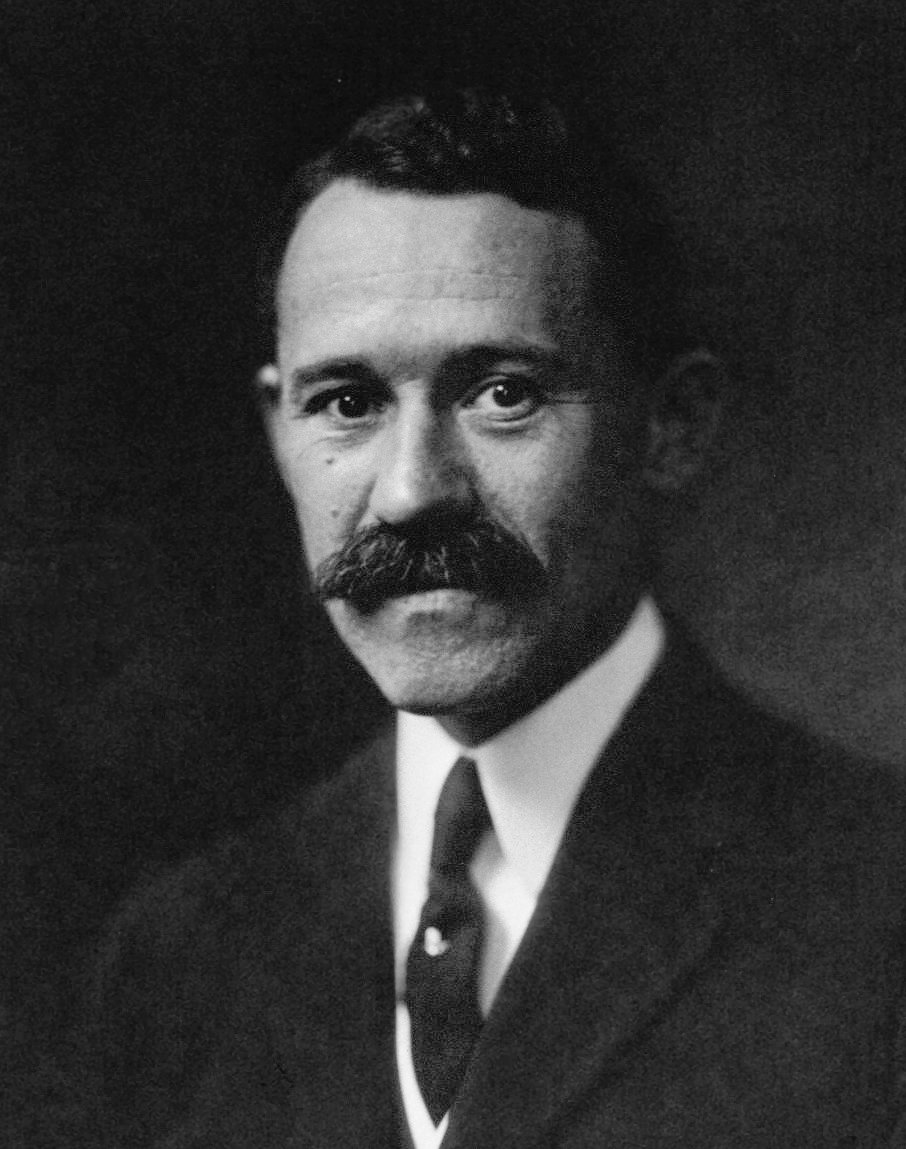

Theodore Caldwell Janeway (November 2, 1872 – December 27, 1917) was the first full-time professor of medicine at the Johns Hopkins University School of Medicine, recruited in 1914.

== Biography ==
Theodore C. Janeway was born in New York City, the son of Edward G. Janeway, M.D. Edward Janeway was himself a prominent clinician and pathologist who is credited with the identification of non-tender lesions on the palms or soles of individuals with endocarditis, later called Janeway lesions in his honor. Theodore received his A.B. in 1892 from Yale University and his M.D. in 1895 from the College of Physicians and Surgeons of Columbia University. After interning, he served on the staff of City Hospital and St. Luke's Hospital in New York and was a faculty member at New York University and Bellevue Medical College and at the College of Physicians and Surgeons.

Janeway was recruited as the first full-time professor of medicine at the Johns Hopkins University School of Medicine in 1914. He helped to plan the new Hunterian Laboratory for experimental surgery and medicine and improved the facilities for metabolic studies. The Janeway firm of the Osler Residency program at Johns Hopkins Hospital is named after him.

In 1917, Janeway resigned his position at Johns Hopkins and entered the medical services of the U.S. Army, with the rank of Major. He was assigned to the Office of the Surgeon General, where he became director of research on heart disease. Janeway died of pneumonia on December 27, 1917.

In 1898, Janeway married Eleanor Caroline Alderson. Their son Charles Alderson Janeway was an eminent American pediatrician, medical professor, and clinical researcher. Their son Edward G. Janeway was President of the Vermont Senate.
