= Charles Alderson Janeway =

American pediatrician (1909–1981)

Charles Alderson Janeway (1909 in New York City – 1981 in Weston, Massachusetts) was an American pediatrician, medical professor, and clinical researcher.

== Early life and education ==
Janeway was born in 1909 in New York City. He came from a prominent family of physicians: His father, Theodore Caldwell Janeway, was the first full-time professor of medicine at the Johns Hopkins University School of Medicine and discovered one of the first methods for measuring blood pressure. His grandfather, Edward Gamaliel Janeway, served as the Health Commissioner of New York and dean of the combined New York University/Bellevue Hospital medical colleges. Edward G. Janeway also identified of Janeway lesions, which are named in his honor.

Charles Janeway graduated from Milton Academy in Milton, Massachusetts. He graduated from Yale University in 1930, where he was a member of Skull and Bones. He also graduated from the Johns Hopkins University School of Medicine.

== Career ==
Janeway was physician in chief from 1946 to 1976 at Children's Hospital Boston. He also was Thomas Morgan Rotch Professor of Pediatrics at Harvard Medical School. As a clinical researcher, he discovered the first immunodeficiency disease.

In 1964, Janeway worked with the provincial government in St. John's, Newfoundland, Canada to establish a children's hospital. In recognition of his efforts and dedication, the hospital was named the Dr. Charles Alderson Janeway Child Health Centre. Its first location was in the former base hospital on Pepperrell Air Force Base which had closed several years earlier.

According to a 2007 biography by physicians Robert J. Haggerty and Frederick H. Lovejoy Jr.:

"Janeway built the first department of pediatrics in the nation with subspecialties based upon the new developments in basic sciences. Janeway and his colleagues defined the gamma globulin disorders that resulted in children's increased susceptibility to infections and associated arthritic disorders. Janeway was the most visible U.S. pediatrician on the world scene in the last half of the 20th century. He traveled widely, taught modern pediatrics to thousands of physicians throughout the developing world, and brought many of them to the U.S. for further training. He was instrumental in starting teaching hospitals in Shiraz, Iran, and Cameroon."

== Personal life and legacy ==
He married Elizabeth Bradley, a social worker, in 1932. They had four children: Anne, Elizabeth, Charles, and Barbara. Charles A. Janeway died at his home in Weston, Massachusetts, in 1981.

His medical legacy continued to subsequent generations. His son, Charles Janeway (1943–2003), was an immunologist, noted Yale University medical professor, and member of the National Academy of Sciences, who made significant contributions to the field of innate immune response. His daughter Barbara is a nurse-practitioner in New Hampshire. Four of his granddaughters are physicians; Elizabeth Gold of Toronto and Katherine A. Janeway of Boston, are also pediatricians, Megan Janeway of Boston is a general surgeon and Hannah Janeway of Los Angeles is an emergency medicine physician representing the sixth generation of Janeway doctors.
