= Edward G. Janeway =

American politician

President of the Vermont Senate
- In office 1969–1975
- Preceded by: George W. F. Cook
- Succeeded by: Robert A. Bloomer

Member of the Vermont Senate
- In office 1959–1979 Serving with Various (Multi-member district)
- Preceded by: Henry A. Stoddard, William F. Kissell
- Succeeded by: Robert T. Gannett, David A. Gibson
- Constituency: Windham County

Member of the Vermont House of Representatives
- In office 1951–1957
- Preceded by: Bert F. Howe
- Succeeded by: Marvin J. Howard
- Constituency: London

Personal details
- Born: August 25, 1901 New Rochelle, New York, US
- Died: January 10, 1986 (aged 84) Hanover, New Hampshire, US
- Resting place: Middletown Cemetery, Londonderry, Vermont, US
- Party: Republican
- Spouse: Elinor White (m. 1925–1986)
- Children: 5
- Education: Yale University (B.A., 1922)
- Occupation: Politician, investment banker, dairy farmer, cattle breeder
- Awards: Croix de Guerre with palm (France)

Military service
- Branch/service: United States Army; United States Navy
- Years of service: 1918–1920 (Army); 1942–1946 (Navy)
- Rank: Corporal (Army); Lieutenant Commander (Navy)
- Wars: World War I World War II

Edward G. Janeway (August 25, 1901 – January 10, 1986) was a Vermont politician who served as President of the Vermont Senate.

== Biography ==
The son of Theodore Caldwell Janeway and Eleanor Caroline (Alderson) and brother of Charles Alderson Janeway, Edward Gamaliel Janeway was born in New Rochelle, New York on August 25, 1901. He graduated from Yale University in 1922 and became an investment banker with White Weld & Co. in New York City. During World War I, he served with Yale's Battery C. He remained with the battery, a unit of the Connecticut National Guard, from 1918 to 1920 and attained the rank of corporal.

Janeway served in the Navy during World War II, attaining the rank of lieutenant commander. During the war, he was in charge of a base in England and took part in the Normandy landings of June 1944, for which the French government later awarded him the Croix de Guerre with palm.

In 1945 he moved to South Londonderry, Vermont, where he was a dairy farmer and cattle breeder. He was also active in several businesses, including serving on the board of directors of the Catamount National Bank and the Stratton Corporation. He was also involved in several civic projects, including holding the office of President of the Calvin Coolidge Memorial Foundation.

He served in several local offices, including town meeting moderator and school board member. A Republican, Janeway served in the Vermont House of Representatives from 1951 to 1957.

Janeway served as a member of the Republican National Committee from 1952 to 1972. In 1958 Janeway was elected to the Vermont Senate. He served 10 terms, 1959 to 1979, and was Senate President from 1969 to 1975.

Janeway died in Hanover, New Hampshire on January 10, 1986. He was buried at Middletown Cemetery in Londonderry, Vermont.

== Family ==
In 1925, Janeway married Elinor White, whose family was involved in founding the White Weld & Co. investment company. They were married until his death and were the parents of five children.

Political offices
Preceded by George W. F. Cook	President pro tempore of the Vermont State Senate; 1969 – 1975	Succeeded by Robert A. Bloomer
