= Scabbard and Blade =

U.S. college military honor society

- S&B
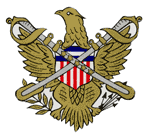
- Founded: 1904; 122 years ago University of Wisconsin
- Type: Honor
- Affiliation: Independent
- Former affiliation: PIC; ACHS
- Status: Active
- Defunct date: 2019?
- Emphasis: ROTC, JROTC, and midshipmen leadership
- Scope: National
- Pillars: Honor, leadership, professionalism, officership, unity
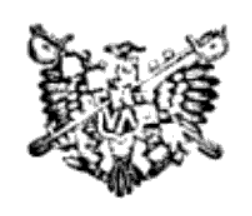
- Member badge
- Colors: Red, white, and blue
- Symbol: 5 stars
- Publication: Scabbard & Blade Today
- Chapters: 1 active collegiate
- Members: 137,000+ (2014) lifetime
- Headquarters: 1018 S. Lewis Street; Stillwater, Oklahoma 74074; United States
- Website: www.scabbardandblade.org

Scabbard and Blade (S&B) is an American collegiate military honor society founded at the University of Wisconsin in 1904. It was founded as a men's organization and later became a co-educational society. Membership is for Reserve Officers' Training Corps (ROTC) cadets and midshipmen of all military services. Scabbard and Blade also has a Junior Program for Junior Reserve Officers' Training Corps (JROTC) cadets and midshipmen.

S&B was a member of the Association of College Honor Societies. By 2021, all collegiate companies (chapters) went inactive, but the society continued to initiate members through the national organization.

== History ==
Scabbard and Blade was founded in 1904 at the University of Wisconsin in Madison, Wisconsin. Its founders were five senior officers in the Reserve Officers' Training Corps (ROTC): Leo M. Cook, Albert W. Foster, Victor R. Griggs, Charles A. Taylor, and Harold K. Weld. The society's mission was "developing aspiring and current military officers that emulate the Five Star qualities while fostering strong joint-service relationships".

Although membership is open to Reserve Officers' Training Corps (ROTC) cadets and midshipmen of all military services, the society was modeled after the U.S. Army. Its founding chapter was designated 1st Regiment, Company A. In 1905, Company B was established at the University of Minnesota. This was followed by Company C at Cornell University and Company D at the University of Iowa in 1906. By 1915, S&B had fifteen companies and had initiated 866 members.

Its first national convention was held in Madison, Wisconsin, on May 11, 1906, and included representatives of the society's four companies. Conventions were annual until April 1916, when S&B ceased operations due to World War I, and were reestablished in February 1920. After the 1920 meeting, conventions were held biannually.

In 1921, S&B had initiated 2,900 members; this had grown to 14,300 members by 1930. According to its 1940 directory, S&B had 31,980 members. As with World War I, the society was inactive during World War II when there were no courses of military training in universities and colleges because all able-bodied men were in the service. After 70 companies had been reactivated, a national convention was held in November 1947. S&B had 51,000 total initiates by 1950 and 107,000 by 1960. The society had grown 150 active chapters or companies active companies, 20 inactive companies, and 89,154 total members in 1962.

Scabbard and Blade was founded as a men's organization and became a co-educational society. Before going coed, it sponsored auxiliaries and support organizations for women, including Guidon, Blades, and the National Organization of L'Esprit de Corps, founded in 1971. It had grown to around 130,000 members by 1981.

S&B became a member of the Association of College Honor Societies in 2010. In February 2012, it had 59 collegiate chapters and 449 members. In 2014, there were some 137,000 cadet officers. Around 2021, the national society closed all collegiate companies (chapters) but continued to initiate members through the national organization. A new company was formed at Embry–Riddle Aeronautical University, Daytona Beach around 2024.

Its national headquarters is located in Stillwater, Oklahoma.

== Symbols ==
Scabbard and Blade's five stars or pillars is honor, leadership, professionalism, officership, and unity.

The Scabbard and Blade badge is a gold American eagle, holding a shield over its breast, crossed with two swords. The scabbard features small jewels that represented five stars. The society's colors are red, white, and blue. Its membership bar is red on its top half and blue on its bottom half, with five silver stars along the line between the two colors. Its citation cord is mostly red, interwoven with blue, and was worn on the left shoulder.

Its quarterly publication was originally called Scabbard & Blade Journal and was later called Scabbard & Blade Today.

== Membership ==
Membership in Scabbard and Blade is for life. Its membership categories are active, alumni, associate, and honorary. Associate members include active or retired commissioned officers who did not join the society during college or civilian college officials. Honorary memberships are awarded to civilians for accomplishments and contributions to national defense.

=== ROTC ===
Members must be an ROTC student in at least their second semester, preferably in their junior or senior year. They must rank in the top twenty percent of their unit commander's Order of Merit Listing or have a 3.5 GPA. Candidates also need a letter of nomination from their ROTC unit's commander and take a pledge to become a commissioned officer in the United States Armed Forces.

=== JROTC ===
There are two membership levels for a JROTC Company: junior membership and distinguished junior membership. Junior membership is open to active JROTC students who are juniors or seniors in high school and are in the top twenty percent of their class with a GPA of 3.0 or higher. Distinguished junior membership is only open to JROTC students who are active junior members in S&B.

== Governance ==
Scabbard and Blade consists of three organizations: the National Society of Scabbard and Blade, the National Honor Society of Scabbard and Blade, and Scabbard and Blade Endowment Resources. The latter is a nonprofit corporation that raises funds and endowments to support the ROTC principles.

=== Officers ===
The chapters of Scabbard and Blade are called companies. Companies are organized into regiments by geographic local and order of establishment. Each Scabbard and Blade company has a faculty or school staff member who serves as the company advisor. In addition, each company is required to have the following officers:

- Company captain (commander)
- Company 1st lieutenant (vice commander)
- Company 2nd lieutenant (finance officer)
- Company first sergeant (executive officer)

== See also ==
- Honor society
- Professional fraternities and sororities
