= Michael P. Drescher =

Vermont attorney and judge

Michael Drescher

Associate Justice of the Vermont Supreme Court
- Incumbent
- Assumed office February 4, 2026
- Appointed by: Phil Scott
- Preceded by: William D. Cohen

United States Attorney for the District of Vermont
- Acting
- In office January 20, 2025 – January 9, 2026
- President: Donald Trump
- Preceded by: Nikolas P. Kerest
- Succeeded by: Jonathan Ophardt (acting)

Personal details
- Born: 1965 (age 60–61) Ventura, California, U.S.
- Spouse: Christina Stearns (m. 1990)
- Children: 2
- Education: Dartmouth College (BA); Northwestern University (JD)

Michael P. Drescher (born 1965) is an American attorney and judge from Vermont. He served as acting US Attorney for the District of Vermont from 2025 to 2026. In 2026, he was appointed an Associate Justice of the Vermont Supreme Court.

== Biography ==
Michael Philip Drescher was born in Ventura, California, in 1965, a son of Philip C. Drescher and Marcia Lou (Laughlin) Drescher. He was raised and educated in Ventura and graduated from The Thacher School in Ojai in 1983. Drescher attended Dartmouth College from 1983 to 1987 and graduated with an A.B. in mathematics. From 1987 to 1992, Drescher resided in Chicago and was employed by the Leo Burnett Worldwide advertising firm, where his positions included media buyer-planner, assistant account executive, and account executive. He is married to Christina Stearns and they are the parents of two children.

Drescher attended Northwestern University Law School from 1992 to 1995 and graduated cum laude and Order of the Coif. After law school, Drescher was a law clerk for Judge Fred I. Parker of the United States Court of Appeals for the Second Circuit. After attaining admission to the bar in 1996, he was employed by the Burlington, Vermont law firm then known as Sheehey, Brue, Gray & Furlong, where he became a partner in 2000.

In January 2002, Drescher became an assistant US Attorney in Burlington. Initially assigned to the office's civil division, in 2009 he transferred to the criminal division. In September 2023, Drescher was appointed first assistant US Attorney, a management position that included responsibility for supervising the US Attorney's criminal, civil, and administrative divisions.

In 2024, Drescher was a candidate for a judgeship on Vermont's federal district court, but the appointment went to Mary Kay Lanthier. In January 2025, he was appointed acting US Attorney for Vermont, and he served in this position until January 2026.

In January 2026, Governor Phil Scott nominated Drescher to fill the vacancy on the Vermont Supreme Court that had been created by the retirement of William D. Cohen. On January 29, the Vermont Senate's judiciary committee voted to send Drescher's nomination to the full senate without a recommendation for or against confirmation. The senators who voted against recommending him expressed concern about Drescher's role in defending the federal government's actions during the Deportation in the second Trump administration controversy. On 3 February, the senate vote on confirming Drescher was 15 to 15; Lieutenant Governor John S. Rodgers broke the tie with an affirmative vote, and Drescher was confirmed.

Legal offices
Preceded by William D. Cohen	Associate Justice of the Vermont Supreme Court; 2026–present	Incumbent
