= Mohsen Mahdawi =

Palestinian activist and student

- محسن المهداوي
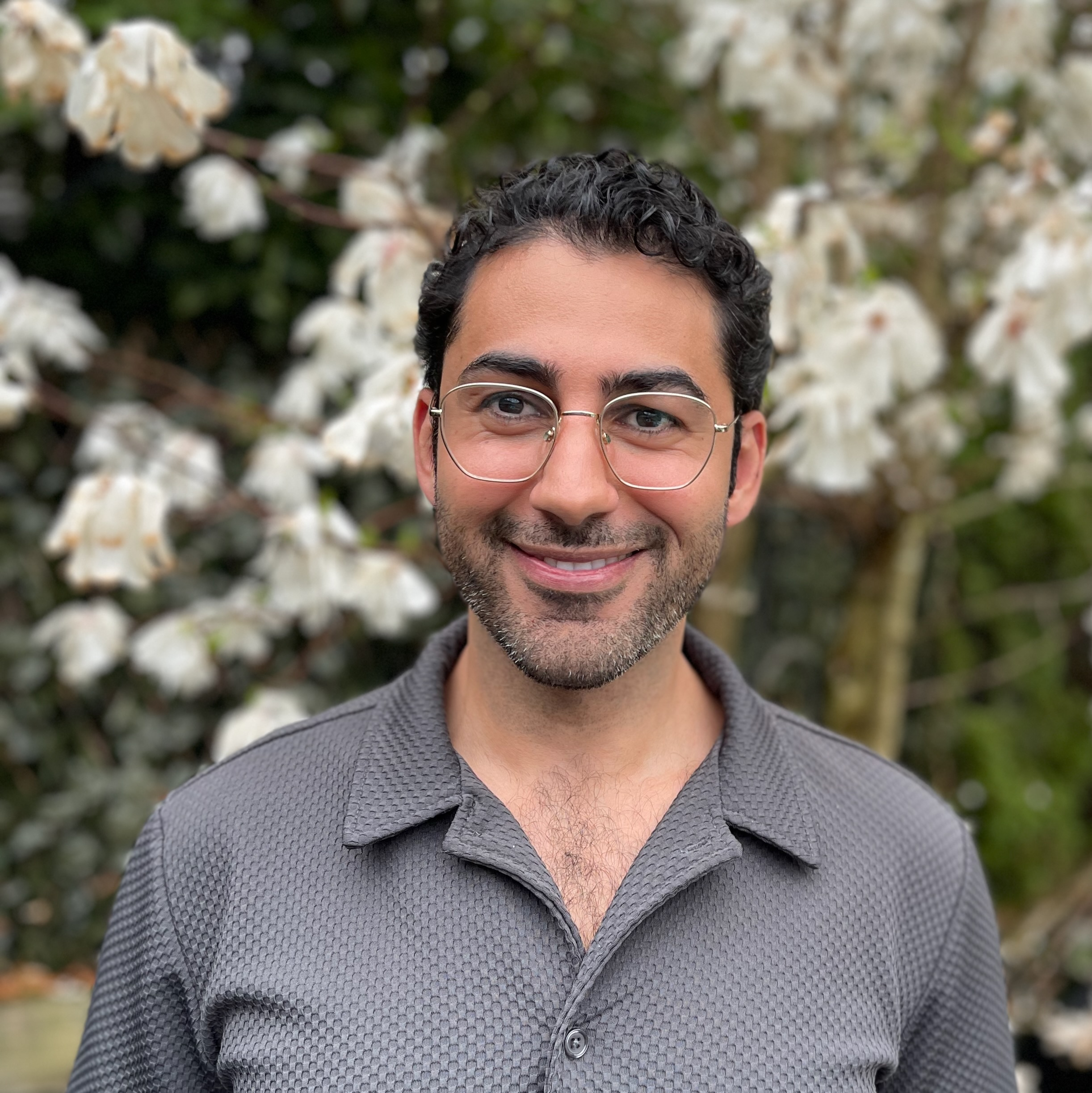
- Mahdawi in May 2025
- Education: Columbia University School of General Studies (BA); Columbia University School of International and Public Affairs (MA in-progress)

Mohsen Mahdawi (Arabic: محسن المهداوي) is a Palestinian activist and student at Columbia University's School of International and Public Affairs. As a student in Columbia’s School of General Studies, he led pro-Palestinian campus protests at Columbia in 2023. In 2024, he initiated a reconciliation outreach program with critics of the pro-Palestinian movement, working with Jewish groups in the process.

Though he has been accused of no crime, Mahdawi was among a number of student activists targeted by the Trump administration for deportation. In March 2025, the US State Department, citing the Immigration and Nationality Act of 1952, claimed Mahdawi "would have a potentially serious adverse foreign policy consequences and would compromise a compelling U.S. foreign policy interest." In April, 2025, he was arrested and detained by U.S. Immigration and Customs Enforcement (ICE) agents at the U.S. Citizenship and Immigration Services (USCIS) office in Colchester, Vermont, where he had been informed he had an interview to obtain U.S. citizenship. He was released from detention and granted a temporary restraining order to prevent federal authorities from transferring him out of Vermont. In May 2025, he attended his graduation from Columbia's School of General Studies.

== Biography ==
=== Early life ===
Mohsen Mahdawi is a third-generation Palestinian refugee from the Far'a refugee camp, where he lived until 2014. Mahdawi said that, in his childhood in the Israeli-occupied West Bank, he saw his best friend—then 12 years old—shot and killed by an Israeli soldier. He also said an Israeli soldier shot him in the leg when he was 15.

In 2014, Mahdawi moved to the United States, and in 2015 he became a legal permanent resident with a green card. He enrolled at Lehigh University in Pennsylvania in 2018 to study computer science.

=== At Columbia ===
Mahdawi transferred to Columbia University's School of General Studies to study philosophy. Two weeks after US District Judge Geoffrey W. Crawford ordered his release from ICE detention, Mahdawi attended his graduation in May 2025. He was accepted into a master's program at Columbia's School of International and Public Affairs and began in the fall 2025 semester.

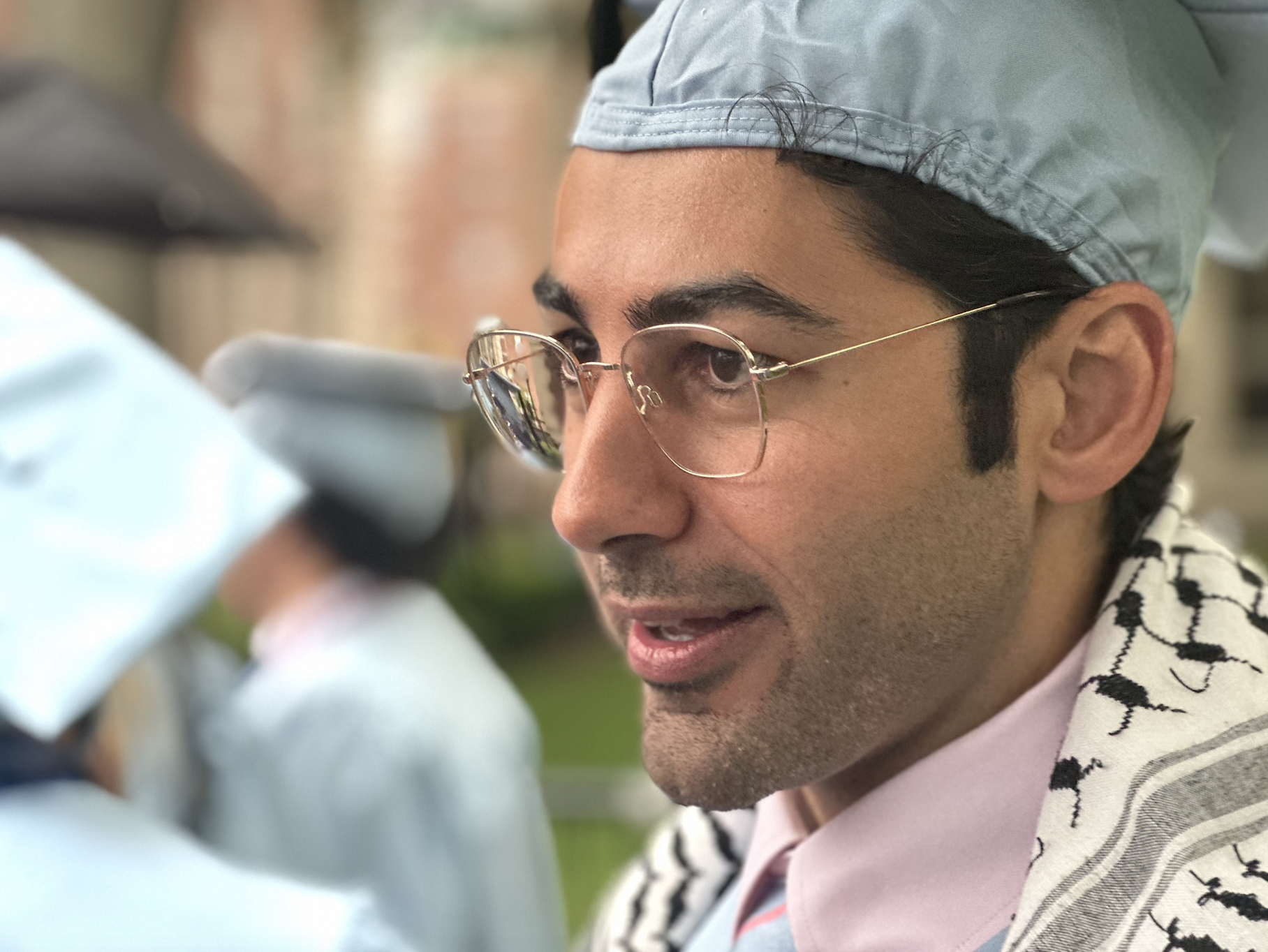
Mahdawi at his graduation from Columbia University's School of General Studies after federal judge Geoffrey W. Crawford ordered his release from ICE detention in 2025.

In April, 2025, he was arrested and detained by U.S. Immigration and Customs Enforcement (ICE) agents at the U.S. Citizenship and Immigration Services (USCIS) office in Colchester, Vermont, where he had been informed he had an interview to obtain U.S. citizenship.

Mahdawi is a Buddhist who believes in "non-violence and empathy as a central tenet of his religion". He served as president of the Columbia University Buddhist Association and organized a large Vesak festival at the University in collaboration with the Buddhist Council of New York in 2023. In August 2024, he engaged in a discussion with Buddhist monk Bhikkhu Bodhi, the president of the Buddhist Association of the United States.

==== Pro-Palestinian advocacy and protests during the Gaza war ====
Following the outbreak of the Gaza war in October 2023, Mahdawi led and helped organize pro-Palestinian protests at Columbia University. In a December 2023 interview with 60 Minutes, he has said that Israel was committing genocide in Gaza and that he wanted a peaceful end to the Israeli–Palestinian conflict. Mahdawi and fellow Columbia student Mahmoud Khalil co-founded Dar: the Palestinian Student Society to "celebrate Palestinian culture, history, and identity".

===== November 9, 2023 protest at Columbia University =====
At a walkout, art installation, and die-in protest held by Students for Justice in Palestine (SJP) and Jewish Voice for Peace (JVP) at the steps of Low Memorial Library on November 9, 2023, Mahdawi told his story of growing up in a refugee camp in the Israeli occupied West Bank, of witnessing his 12-year-old best friend killed in front of him by an Israeli soldier, and of being shot in the leg himself at 15 years of age, also by an Israeli soldier. There were pro-Israel counter-protesters, whom Mahdawi addressed: "Even though you're on the other side, we beg you, we cry, we ask you to see the humanity in us, to join us in our fight for freedom, for justice, for humanity."

An unidentified person interrupted the protest, approaching and screaming anti-Jewish and anti-Black slurs and profanities, climbing over a chain barrier and reportedly trying "to instigate fights with numerous students". According to The New York Times, a "student on the outskirts of a Nov. 9 protest had shouted antisemitic curses", but "he was not affiliated with any of the student groups, and was shouted down by the pro-Palestinian protesters", including Mahdawi, who denounced the individual directly. Using the microphone, Mahdawi said, "Shame on the person who called [for] 'death to Jews,'" and the crowd of demonstrators started chanting "shame on you", joining in his condemnation of the unidentified individual's hateful remarks.

The following day, Gerald Rosberg, then a senior administrator at Columbia, announced the suspension of SJP and JVP for what he called an "unauthorized event" that included "threatening rhetoric and intimidation". The suspension came after senior administrators revised policies cited in the suspension on October 24, adding a new section to the University Event Policy webpage that declared the administration's right to "regulate the time, place and manner of certain forms of public expression" without input from the University Senate.

Columbia's claim that the "threatening rhetoric and intimidation" came from SJP and JVP was debunked by journalists, and retracted by Rosberg privately in a University Senate Plenary on November 17, 2023. However, Columbia did not reverse the suspension of SJP and JVP, and it never retracted the statement; nor did it issue a public statement to correct and clarify the matter. U.S. Secretary of State Marco Rubio later cited the phrase "threatening rhetoric and intimidation" verbatim, apparently drawing from the statement that Columbia never retracted, in an April 2025 memo drawn up to support his case against Mahdawi.

==== Columbia University Apartheid Divest ====
Mahdawi also helped organize and launch Columbia University Apartheid Divest (CUAD), a coalition of over 80 student groups (later amassing over 120 student groups) formed after Columbia's administration quietly changed the university's event policy before banning Students for Justice in Palestine and Jewish Voice for Peace. CUAD was launched on November 14, four days after the administration banned SJP and JVP. CUAD led multiple pro-Palestinian demonstrations calling on the university to divest from Israel.

==== Spring 2024: Outreach ====
In the spring of 2024, Mahdawi stepped back from the movement to focus on fostering connections with Jewish and Israeli students. He invited several of his critics, including assistant professor Shai Davidai, to speak with him, and remained in contact with David Myers, a former leader of the progressive New Israel Fund and a professor of Jewish history at the University of California, Los Angeles. He repeatedly denounced antisemitism in speeches and interviews, and connected his opposition to antisemitism with his support for the Palestinian cause, saying that "the fight for the freedom of Palestine and the fight against antisemitism go hand in hand, because injustice anywhere is a threat to justice everywhere." One of Mahdawi's Israeli colleagues, Aharon Dardik, stated that Mahdawi was vocally opposed to terrorism and antisemitism, instead advocating for peaceful opposition to the conflict. Mahdawi and Dardik created a "framework for the solution to the Israeli-Palestinian conflict" as one of their class's final research projects.

=== Arrest, detention, and release ===
Mahdawi's detention arose from his activism in support of Palestinians and in opposition to the Gaza war as a student at Columbia University, which motivated the U.S. State Department to initiate deportation proceedings, claiming that his actions harm U.S. foreign policy. The U.S. Immigration and Customs Enforcement (ICE) arranged Mahdawi's apprehension at the U.S. Citizenship and Immigration Services (USCIS) office in Colchester, Vermont, where USCIS had scheduled an interview for him to obtain U.S. citizenship. He was detained on April 14, 2025.

Mahdawi's legal team immediately filed a habeas corpus petition against Donald Trump and his administration, describing his detention as unlawful. His lawyers requested a temporary restraining order to prevent him from being transferred out of Vermont by federal authorities. Vermont federal judge William K. Sessions III granted the request and ordered that Mahdawi remain in Vermont. Vermont federal judge Geoffrey W. Crawford extended the request on April 23.

On April 30, 2025, federal judge Geoffrey W. Crawford in Vermont ordered the release of Mahdawi, stating that "the two weeks of detention so far demonstrate great harm to a person who has been charged with no crime."

In July, a panel of the US Court of Appeals for the Second Circuit with the judges—two of whom were appointed by Donald Trump and one by George W. Bush—decided that Mahdawi's case should have been resolved in the immigration court system of the US Department of Justice, ordering the ruling for Mahdawi's release to be overturned. The July ruling of the Second Circuit ruling does not order his immediate re-arrest and the American Civil Liberties Union, which is representing Mahdawi, said there is no legal basis for his deportation or re-detention during the continuing appeals process. On July 22, the national American Association of University Professors (AAUP) and Columbia University AAUP chapter issued a statement in support of Mahdawi, writing that "the government cannot use its authority to impose ideological conformity on higher education or punish people for engaging in constitutionally protected expression."
