= Eric Miller (Vermont) =

United States Attorney for Vermont (born 1969)

Eric S. Miller
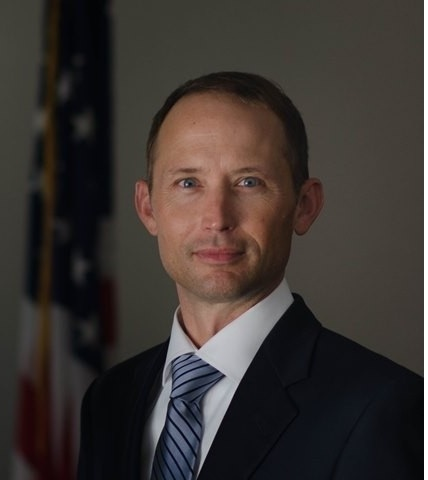
- Miller as US Attorney for Vermont in 2015

United States Attorney for Vermont
- In office June 30, 2015 – February 10, 2017
- President: Barack Obama
- Preceded by: Tristram J. Coffin
- Succeeded by: Christina Nolan

Personal details
- Born: 1969 (age 56–57) Menomonee Falls, Wisconsin, US
- Party: Democratic
- Spouse: Elizabeth Ann Hawkins (m. 1995)
- Education: Duke University, Yale Law School
- Profession: Attorney

Eric S. Miller (born 1969) is an American attorney from Vermont. He served as United States Attorney for Vermont from June 2015 until February 2017. A native of Wisconsin, he graduated from Duke University and Yale Law School, and practiced law in Burlington, Vermont before his appointment as US Attorney. After leaving office, he worked as senior vice president and general counsel for UVM Health.

== Early life ==
Eric Steven Miller was born in Menomonee Falls, Wisconsin in 1969, a son of Lauren E. Miller and Lynn (Schultz) Miller. He was raised and educated in Horicon, Wisconsin and graduated from Horicon High School as the salutatorian in 1988. In 1992, he graduated from Duke University's Sanford School of Public Policy with a Bachelor of Arts degree in public policy and attained magna cum laude honors and admission to Phi Beta Kappa. He received his J.D. from Yale Law School in 1995, where he was an editor of the The Yale Law Journal.

In May 1995, Miller married Elizabeth Ann Hawkins, a Yale Law School classmate. Elizabeth Miller's public service career includes chief of staff for Governor Peter Shumlin and commissioner of the Vermont Public Service Department. Her private sector career includes serving as vice president and chief legal officer for Green Mountain Power Corporation.

== Career ==
After law school, Miller was a law clerk for Judge Steven J. McAuliffe of New Hampshire's U.S. District Court from 1995 to 1996, then practiced law with O'Melveny & Meyers in San Francisco from 1996 to 1998. He then worked as a law clerk for Judge Fred I. Parker of the United States Court of Appeals for the Second Circuit from 1998 to 2002. After his clerkship, he joined Sheehey Furlong & Behm in Burlington, Vermont. He became a partner and was the firm's managing partner from 2007 to 2011. Miller's practice included criminal and civil cases in both state and federal courts and regulatory panels. As a litigator, he specialized in trying complex cases to verdict and arguing appeals to the Vermont Supreme Court and the Second Circuit Court of Appeals.

A Democrat, in June 2015, Miller was appointed as Vermont's U.S. Attorney, succeeding Tristram J. Coffin. He served until February 2017 and was succeeded by Christina Nolan. In May 2017, Miller became deputy general counsel and senior advisor for UVM Health. In October 2018, he was promoted to senior vice president and general counsel. As a senior executive, Miller's responsibilities at UVM health include legal, compliance, privacy, and risk management. Miller's civic activities include service as chair of the board of directors for the King Street Center youth development and family support center. He also served as vice chair of Burlington's Development Review Board and a director of the Turning Point Center for Chittenden County. In addition, he has served as a director of the Vermont Community Foundation and the Flynn Center for the Performing Arts.
