= Nikolas P. Kerest =

American lawyer (born 1972)

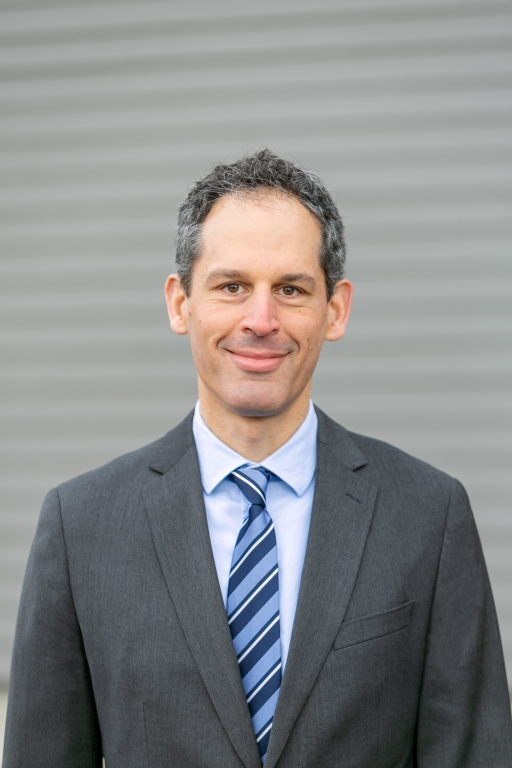

United States Attorney for the District of Vermont
- In office December 10, 2021 – January 20, 2025
- President: Joe Biden
- Preceded by: Christina E. Nolan; Jonathan Ophardt (acting)
- Succeeded by: Michael P. Drescher

Personal details
- Born: Nikolas Peter Kerest (acting); 1972 (age 53–54) New York City, New York, U.S.
- Education: Williams College (BA); Cornell University (JD)

Nikolas Peter Kerest (born 1972) is an American lawyer who had served as the United States attorney for the District of Vermont.

== Education ==
Nikolas Kerest attended the Hackley School in Tarrytown, New York, and graduated in 1990. Kerest received a Bachelor of Arts from Williams College in 1994 and a Juris Doctor from Cornell Law School in 2000.

== Career ==
Kerest served as a law clerk for Judge Fred I. Parker of the United States Court of Appeals for the Second Circuit from 2000 to 2001. He was in private practice at Ropes & Gray in Boston from 2001 to 2004 and at Pierce Atwood LLP in Portland, Maine from 2004 to 2010. From 2019 to 2021, he served as an Assistant United States Attorney in the criminal division of the United States Attorney's office for the District of Vermont. From 2010 to 2014, he served as Assistant United States Attorney in the civil division of the U.S Attorney's office and as civil chief from 2014 to 2019. While serving as civil chief, he also served as the civil rights coordinator from 2014 to 2016.

=== U.S. attorney for the District of Vermont ===
On September 28, 2021, President Joe Biden nominated Kerest to be the United States attorney for the District of Vermont. On November 4, 2021, his nomination was reported out of committee by voice vote, Senators Josh Hawley and Marsha Blackburn voted "no" on record. On December 7, 2021, his nomination was confirmed in the United States Senate by voice vote. On December 10, 2021, he was sworn into office by Judge Geoffrey W. Crawford.

Legal offices
Preceded by Christina E. Nolan; Jonathan Ophardt (Acting)	United States Attorney for the District of Vermont; 2021–2025	Succeeded by Michael P. Drescher (Acting)
