= Detention of Rümeysa Öztürk =

2025 arrest in Massachusetts

- Part of the Visa and deportation controversies in the second Trump administration
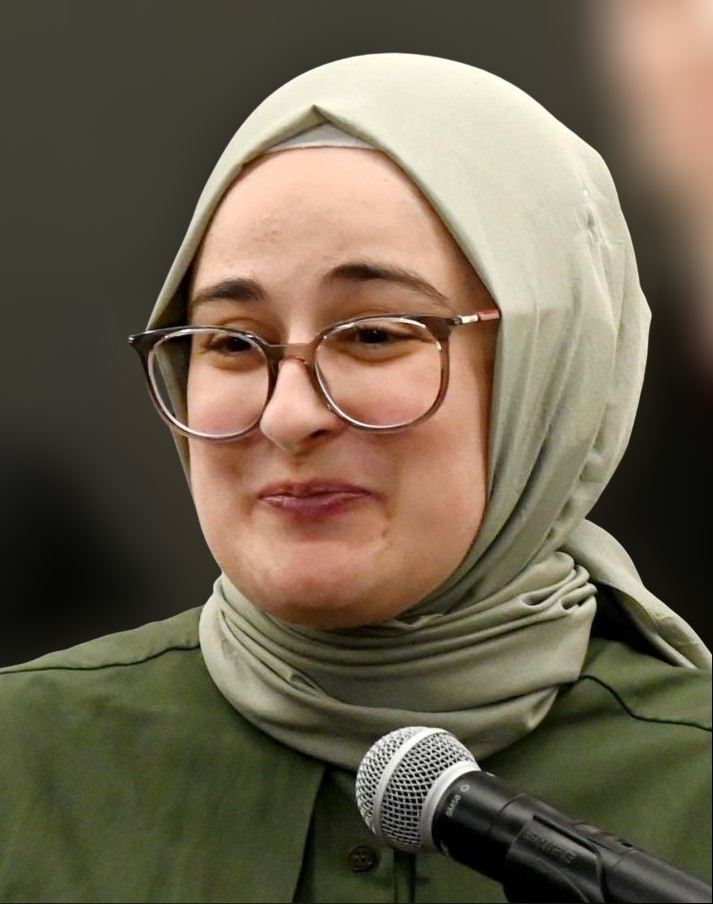
- Rümeysa Öztürk addresses reporters at press conference following her release from detention (May 12, 2025).
- Date: March 25, 2025
- Location: Somerville, Massachusetts, United States
- Cause: Criticism of Israel's war in Gaza
- Participants: Department of Homeland Security, U.S. Immigration and Customs Enforcement
- Outcome: Release on bail
- Arrests: Rümeysa Öztürk

On March 25, 2025, six masked plainclothes agents from the US Department of Homeland Security (DHS) arrested 30-year-old Turkish national and Tufts University student Rümeysa Öztürk in Somerville, Massachusetts after the US State Department's revoked her F-1 student visa for co-authoring an op-ed in The Tufts Daily. She was then taken from Massachusetts to the South Louisiana ICE Processing Center and detained there.

Öztürk's arrest sparked condemnation from elected officials and others. Some accused the Trump administration of targeting students for their political views without due process, while others called it a violation of civil liberties. The incident also provoked protests at Tufts University and across Massachusetts.

As of April 17, 2026, Öztürk has returned to Turkey to continue her career as a scholar studying child development. With the help from ACLU, she and the Trump administration have jointly requested the termination of proceedings in front of the Board of Immigration Appeals.

== Background ==
In 2025, Rümeysa Öztürk, a 30-year-old Turkish national, was a PhD student at Tufts University with an F-1 student visa. Her LinkedIn profile, which has since been deleted, included a master's degree from Columbia University and experience as research assistant at Boston University and as a Fulbright Scholar.

In March 26, 2024, Öztürk and three others co-wrote an opinion piece entitled "Try again, President Kumar: Renewing calls for Tufts to adopt March 4 TCU Senate resolutions" that was published in the university's newspaper The Tufts Daily. The article called for Tufts to divest from companies with ties to Israel and acknowledge Palestinian genocide. The editorial was endorsed by 32 others. Following this, her personal information was made public by Canary Mission, a website that documents those whom it describes as anti-Israel and antisemitic.

The group StopAntisemitism claimed that, while at Tufts, Öztürk had led violent events in support of Hamas and in opposition to Israel and the U.S. Her brother denied this on social media. Her friends had said the only pro-Palestinian activity she had engaged in was the op-ed. After her detention, both her associates at Tufts and her department at the university paid tribute to her character.

The Washington Post reported that Öztürk's visa was revoked at the discretion of Secretary of State Marco Rubio and without her knowledge in the weeks prior to her arrest. The Post also reported that while the initial grounds for the action had been antisemitism or expressing support for a terror organization like Hamas, no evidence was provided to substantiate the allegations.

== Arrest and detention ==
Footage of Öztürk being handcuffed by six plainclothes officers

On March 25, Öztürk was arrested by six plainclothes officers as she left her home to meet friends to break their Ramadan fast. The officers, mostly masked, quickly moved up to her, whereupon they identified themselves as police and took away her phone and backpack. A bystander initially believed the incident to be a kidnapping. In a later sworn statement, Öztürk said that she initially believed she had been abducted by associates of Canary Mission, and that when it was made clear she had been arrested by law enforcement she was not told why. During this time she was shackled and denied access to a lawyer. One of the officers later told her that she would be transported to a detention center in Vermont, as there were none in Massachusetts for women.

Öztürk was subsequently moved several times, including to Vermont, before eventually arriving at the South Louisiana ICE Processing Center. She claimed she was questioned while sleep-deprived, mistreated after suffering asthma attacks, and had been placed in an overcrowded cell in unsanitary conditions during this process. She also said that she was kept entirely indoors for the first week of her detention, and had limited food and water for two weeks.

Representatives of the Turkish government visited Öztürk while in detention to provide consular support and attempt to secure her release. In April a Congressional delegation, led by Louisiana Representative Troy Carter, visited Öztürk and another pro-Palestinian protestor who had been detained, Mahmoud Khalil. Reporting on the conditions the two were kept in, the delegation described the pair as "political prisoners" and noted that both detainees complained of low temperatures as well a lack of medical care, food and religious accommodation. ICE officials would later deny these claims.

Öztürk's location was unknown to anyone but the authorities, in the initial 24 hours following her arrest, including her lawyer. Her movement out of Massachusetts also appeared to contravene an order issued by a US District judge not to be removed within the first 48 hours of her arrest. The US government claimed that due to of a lack of beds, ICE had already planned to move Öztürk to Louisiana prior to her arrest and that the District court had no jurisdiction over federal immigration actions. Legal representatives for both sides disputed where Öztürk's petition to be released should be heard, with District Judge Denise J. Casper eventually ruling it would take place in Vermont, and that an earlier ruling barring her deportation would remain in effect.

Ozturk v. Hyde
- Court: United States District Court for the District of Vermont
- Started: April 4, 2025
- Docket nos.: 2:25-cv-00374, transferred from 1:25-cv-10695

Court membership
- Judge sitting: William K. Sessions (transferred from Denise Jefferson Casper)

== Release and aftermath ==
Öztürk was released on bail in May after US District Judge, William K. Sessions, ordered her immediate release without restrictions. During the hearing Sessions highlighted that no evidence had been presented to support her detention, and that continued detention was likely to be detrimental to her health.

Following her release from detention, Öztürk thanked her supporters. At a press conference at Logan Airport in Boston, Öztürk stated her intention to continue her legal battle against her initial detention and to return to her studies.

Legal proceedings are ongoing in Vermont regarding claims of illegal detention and in Louisiana regarding immigration hearings.

On December 9, 2025, judge Casper ruled that Öztürk may resume her research and teaching duties at Tufts, as she is likely to succeed in her legal claims.

On January 22, 2026, court records relating to Öztürk's case were unsealed by a federal judge in Boston. The files included Öztürk's Canary Mission profile and the Op-ed she co-authored for the Tufts Daily with no other evidence implicating Öztürk in any law violation, indicating the decision to revoke her visa was heavily based on her co-authorship of the article.

In early February 2026, it was released by Öztürk's lawyers that federal Judge Roopal Patel had ruled in January 2026 that there were no grounds to deport her. Judge Patel also blocked any further proceedings against her, although the federal government can appeal the decision to the Board of Immigration Appeals (BIA).

On February 18, 2026, Öztürk reflected on her experience, trauma, and oppression in a story for The Guardian.

Öztürk received her PhD from Tufts in February 2026. As of April 17, 2026, Öztürk has returned to Turkey to continue her career as a scholar studying child development. Through the help from American Civil Liberties Union, she and the Trump administration have jointly requested the termination of proceedings in front of the BIA.

== Reactions ==
=== Tufts University ===
In the days following the arrest, the university confirmed it had no prior knowledge of the impending action and that it was later only informed of the arrest of a student whose visa had been rescinded. The university also stated that it was disturbed by the footage of the arrest, and that it supported both Muslim students and the wider community. Tufts would later make a submission in support of her release, stating that her arrest had been detrimental to the university's international community.

Following her release in May, a university spokesperson gave a statement supporting the outcome and that the university was looking forward to welcoming her back. The statement also re-affirmed that the initial op-ed Öztürk co-wrote violated no university policies.

=== Civil society ===
Öztürk's arrest and detention led to a number of protests calling for her release. This included protests at Tufts and Harvard, outside the Vermont courthouse where her case was being decided, and a banner being held up during a Major League Soccer game. One protest in downtown Boston involved more than 200, including Mayor Michelle Wu, Massachusetts Attorney General Andrea Campbell, and the president of her Service Employees International Union branch David Foley.

A group of 27 Jewish organizations and synagogues across the US condemned Öztürk's arrest, stating it violated her constitutional rights. They also accused the government of "exploiting" concerns around antisemitism in the process.

=== Politicians ===
US House representatives Ayanna Pressley and Rashida Tlaib condemned her detention and accused the Trump administration of attacking freedoms and increasing government repression. Both Massachusetts senators, Elizabeth Warren and Ed Markey, issued a joint statement demanding that she be provided appropriate medical care and that the government either provide evidence to justify her detention or release her. Several Turkish politicians also condemned her detention, including Yılmaz Tunç, the Turkish minister of justice, Özgür Özel, leader of the Republican People's Party, and Ali Babacan, leader of the Democracy and Progress Party.

== See also ==
- Visa and deportation controversies in the second Trump administration – Use of immigration procedures to target political dissidents residing in the US
- Deportation in the second Trump administration
- Deportation of Rasha Alawieh – Lebanese nephrologist deported by US CBP
- Detention of Mahmoud Khalil – 2025 detention by US Immigration and Customs Enforcement's (ICE)
- Detention of Mohsen Mahdawi – 2025 arrest of Palestinian student in U.S.
