= Detention of Mohsen Mahdawi =

2025 arrest of Palestinian student in U.S.

- Part of the Visa and deportation controversies in the second Trump administration
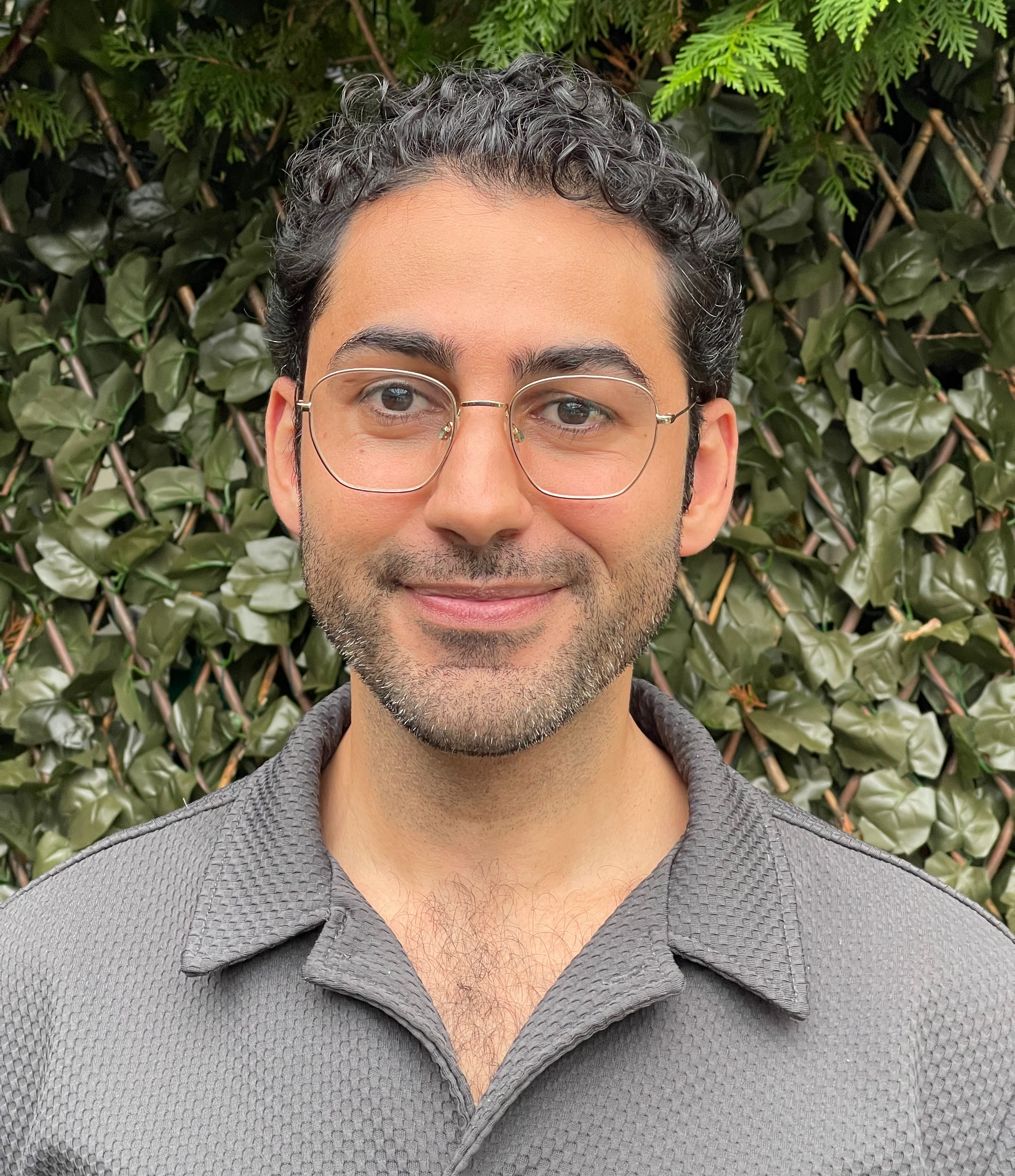
- Mahdawi in May 2025
- Date: April 14, 2025
- Location: St. Albans, Vermont, United States
- Cause: Pro-Palestinian activism at Columbia University
- Participants: U.S. Immigration and Customs Enforcement
- Arrests: Mohsen Mahdawi

The detention of Mohsen Mahdawi arose from his activism in support of Palestinians and in opposition to the Gaza war as a student at Columbia University, which motivated the U.S. State Department to initiate deportation proceedings, claiming that his actions harm U.S. foreign policy. The U.S. Immigration and Customs Enforcement (ICE) arranged Mahdawi's apprehension at the U.S. Citizenship and Immigration Services (USCIS) office in Colchester, Vermont, where USCIS had scheduled an interview for him to obtain U.S. citizenship. He was detained on April 14, 2025.

Mahdawi's legal team immediately filed a habeas corpus petition against Donald Trump and his administration, describing his detention as unlawful. His lawyers requested a temporary restraining order to prevent him from being transferred out of Vermont by federal authorities. Vermont federal judge William K. Sessions III granted the request and ordered that Mahdawi remain in Vermont. Vermont federal judge Geoffrey W. Crawford extended the request on April 23.

On April 30, 2025, federal judge Geoffrey W. Crawford in Vermont ordered the release of Mahdawi, stating that "the two weeks of detention so far demonstrate great harm to a person who has been charged with no crime."

In February 2026, immigration judge Nina Froes dismissed the deportation case against Mahdawi on the basis of unauthenticated evidence, thereby blocking the Trump administration's attempt to deport Mahdawi; in April, the Trump administration fired Froes. On June 3, 2026, Mahdawi was ordered by immigration judge Angela Munson to be deported to Jordan. Mahdawi has appealed to the Court of Appeals for the First Circuit.

In July, a US Court of Appeals for the Second Circuit panel with a majority of Trump-appointed judges decided Mahdawi's case should have been tried through the immigration court system of the US Department of Justice and overturned Crawford's April 2025 decision to release Mahdawi from detention. The panel's decision did not order Mahdawi's re-detention and, according to the American Civil Liberties Union, there would be no legal basis to do so.

== Biography ==
Mohsen Mahdawi is a third-generation Palestinian refugee from the Far'a refugee camp in the occupied West Bank, where he lived until 2014. Mahdawi said that, in his childhood in the Israeli-occupied West Bank, he saw his best friend—then 12 years old—shot and killed by an Israeli soldier. He also said an Israeli soldier shot him in the leg when he was 15.

In 2014, Mahdawi moved to the United States, and in 2015 he became a legal permanent resident with a green card. He enrolled at Lehigh University in Pennsylvania in 2018 to study computer science, before transferring to Columbia University's School of General Studies to study philosophy. He was expected to graduate in May 2025, and was accepted into a master's program at Columbia's School of International and Public Affairs.

== Pro-Palestinian advocacy and protests ==
Following the outbreak of the Gaza war in October 2023, Mahdawi led and helped organize pro-Palestinian protests at Columbia University. In a December 2023 interview with 60 Minutes, he has said that Israel was committing genocide in Gaza and that he wanted a peaceful end to the Israeli–Palestinian conflict. Mahdawi and fellow Columbia student Mahmoud Khalil co-founded Dar: the Palestinian Student Society to "celebrate Palestinian culture, history, and identity".

=== November 9, 2023, protest at Columbia University ===
At a walkout, art installation, and die-in protest held by Students for Justice in Palestine (SJP) and Jewish Voice for Peace (JVP) at the steps of Low Memorial Library on November 9, 2023, Mahdawi told his story of growing up in a refugee camp in the Israeli occupied West Bank, of witnessing his 12-year-old best friend killed in front of him by an Israeli soldier, and of being shot in the leg himself at 15 years of age, also by an Israeli soldier. There were pro-Israel counter-protesters, whom Mahdawi addressed: "Even though you're on the other side, we beg you, we cry, we ask you to see the humanity in us, to join us in our fight for freedom, for justice, for humanity."

An unidentified person interrupted the protest, approaching and screaming anti-Jewish and anti-Black slurs and profanities, climbing over a chain barrier and reportedly trying "to instigate fights with numerous students". According to The New York Times, a "student on the outskirts of a Nov. 9 protest had shouted antisemitic curses", but "he was not affiliated with any of the student groups, and was shouted down by the pro-Palestinian protesters", including Mahdawi, who denounced the individual directly. Using the microphone, Mahdawi said, "Shame on the person who called [for] 'death to Jews,'" and the crowd of demonstrators started chanting "shame on you", joining in his condemnation of the unidentified individual's hateful remarks.

The following day, Gerald Rosberg, then a senior administrator at Columbia, announced the suspension of SJP and JVP for what he called an "unauthorized event" that included "threatening rhetoric and intimidation". The suspension came after senior administrators quietly revised policies cited in the suspension on October 24, adding a new section to the University Event Policy webpage that declared the administration's right to "regulate the time, place and manner of certain forms of public expression" without input from the University Senate.

Columbia's claim that the "threatening rhetoric and intimidation" came from SJP and JVP was debunked by journalists, and retracted by Rosberg privately in a University Senate Plenary on November 17, 2023. However, Columbia did not reverse the suspension of SJP and JVP, and it never retracted the statement; nor did it issue a public statement to correct and clarify the matter. U.S. Secretary of State Marco Rubio later cited the phrase "threatening rhetoric and intimidation" verbatim, apparently drawing from the statement that Columbia never retracted, in an April 2025 memo drawn up to support his case against Mahdawi.

=== Columbia University Apartheid Divest ===
Mahdawi also helped organize and launch Columbia University Apartheid Divest (CUAD), a coalition of over 80 student groups (later amassing over 120 student groups) formed after Columbia's administration quietly changed the university's event policy before banning Students for Justice in Palestine and Jewish Voice for Peace. CUAD was launched on November 14, four days after the administration banned SJP and JVP. CUAD led multiple pro-Palestinian demonstrations calling on the university to divest from Israel.

=== Spring 2024: Outreach ===
In the spring of 2024, Mahdawi stepped back from the movement to focus on fostering connections with Jewish and Israeli students. He invited several of his critics, including assistant professor Shai Davidai, to speak with him, and remained in contact with David Myers, a former leader of the progressive New Israel Fund and a professor of Jewish history at the University of California, Los Angeles. He repeatedly denounced antisemitism in speeches and interviews, and connected his opposition to antisemitism with his support for the Palestinian cause, saying that "the fight for the freedom of Palestine and the fight against antisemitism go hand in hand, because injustice anywhere is a threat to justice everywhere." One of Mahdawi's Israeli colleagues, Aharon Dardik, stated that Mahdawi was vocally opposed to terrorism and antisemitism, instead advocating for peaceful opposition to the conflict. Mahdawi and Dardik created a "framework for the solution to the Israeli-Palestinian conflict" as one of their class's final research projects.

== Arrest by ICE agents ==
Mahdawi's arrest by ICE agents was in coordination with the U.S. Citizenship and Immigration Services (USCIS) office in Colchester, Vermont, which had scheduled an April 15 interview for Mahdawi to obtain his U.S. citizenship. After the interview, he was handcuffed by hooded and masked immigration plain-clothes officers and escorted into an unmarked vehicle.

According to his attorney Luna Droubi, "Mohsen Mahdawi was unlawfully detained today for no reason other than his Palestinian identity." She also called it "unconstitutional" and "an attempt to silence those who speak out against the atrocities in Gaza".

According to Senator Peter Welch, Mahdawi was detained at the Northwest State Correctional Facility in St. Albans.

=== Background ===
Earlier in the month, Mahdawi had received an email from USCIS stating that he had an interview scheduled to obtain his US citizenship. Because the ordinary timeline for the interview would have placed it in December or January, Mahdawi suspected it might be a trap and contacted his representatives in Congress, Senators Bernie Sanders and Peter Welch as well as Representative Becca Balint to inform them of the situation and ask them to intervene if possible. He also contacted State Senator Rebecca White, who had known Mahdawi for around seven years, for her advice on the matter. White cautioned Mahdawi against going. Mahdawi created a Signal group chat titled "Just in case – Mohsen" to communicate with his close friends if he was arrested. White was among those included in the chat.

In the period leading up to his arrest, Mahdawi was targeted by Zionist groups such as Canary Mission and Betar. Canary Mission has an extensive dossier on Mahdawi, in which it claims he wrote a poem in 2013 praising Palestinian militant Dalal Mughrabi and cites a social media post in which he mourns the killing of his cousin, whom it calls a Hamas fighter, by Israeli soldiers. The website mostly accuses him of supporting disinvestment from Israel and being involved in the protest movement Canary Mission describes as "pro-Hamas".

According to The Intercept, even before the arrest of his friend and fellow activist at Columbia Mahmoud Khalil, Mahdawi had reached out to Columbia University administration seeking help so he would not be taken by ICE agents. In a March 17 email addressed to then-Columbia President Katrina Armstrong, School of General Studies dean Lisa Rosen-Metsch, Columbia chief operating officer Cas Holloway, senior vice president of Columbia Health Melanie Bernitz, as well as the Columbia dean of religious life Ian Rottenberg, he wrote: "I am writing to you with a final plea for urgent help. My life is in danger, and Columbia University’s inaction is putting me at further risk." The school did nothing to respond to his appeal.

== Legal proceedings ==
Mahdawi v. Trump
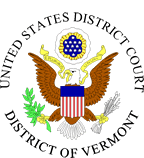
- Court: U.S. District Court for the District of Vermont
- Docket nos.: 2:25-cv-00389

Court membership
- Judge sitting: Geoffrey Crawford

On April 14, Mahdawi's legal team filed a habeas corpus petition against Donald Trump and his administration, describing his detention as unlawful. His lawyers requested a temporary restraining order to prevent him from being transferred out of Vermont by federal authorities. Vermont federal judge William K. Sessions III granted the request and ordered that Mahdawi remain in Vermont. Vermont federal judge Geoffrey W. Crawford extended the request on April 23. According to immigration lawyer Joshua Bardavid, "a case is heard where you are detained, and certain courts are known for being much more government-friendly than other locations."

A memo from US Secretary of State Marco Rubio, apparently drawing from Columbia's mischaracterization of a campus protest on November 9, 2023, stated that Mahdawi had "engaged in threatening rhetoric and intimidation of pro-Israeli bystanders" as a justification for targeting him. This claim was denied by Mahdawi and his lawyer and appears to have been taken verbatim from a November 2023 statement from Columbia University in which it suspended Students for Justice in Palestine and Jewish Voice for Peace. The claim that the "threatening rhetoric and intimidation" came from SJP and JVP was debunked by journalists and retracted by Rosberg privately in a University Senate Plenary on November 17, 2023, but Columbia never issued a public statement to correct and clarify the matter.

=== Release from detention ===
On April 30, 2025, Judge Crawford ordered Mahdawi's release on bail, stating that "the two weeks of detention so far demonstrate great harm to a person who has been charged with no crime." The government attempted to delay Mahdawi's release and keep him in detention by requesting a stay of the order, which was denied by the judge. The Trump administration then appealed to the Court of Appeals for the Second Circuit, asking the court for an emergency stay of Crawford's ruling and challenging the determination that Crawford had authority to make such a ruling. The case was assigned to judges Susan Carney, Alison Nathan, and Barrington Parker, and on May 9, they denied the emergency stay request.

In his statement outside the courtroom following his release, Mahdawi told a crowd of supporters, "we are pro-peace and anti-war" and "to President Trump and his Cabinet, I'm not afraid of you," following up with, "to my people in Palestine: I feel your pain, I see your suffering; and I see freedom and it is very very soon." He then joined the crowd in singing the Civil Rights anthem, We Shall Overcome.

The government's appeal continued in court, and on July 21, 2026, a 3-judge panel overturned Crawford's release order, ruling that Crawford lacked jurisdiction because the case should have first been decided in immigration court.

=== Immigration court proceedings ===
On February 13, 2026, immigration judge Nina Froes dismissed the deportation case against Mahdawi, thereby blocking the Trump administration's attempt to deport Mahdawi. Froes determined that the government failed to authenticate Rubio's memo, which was the basis for the deportation proceedings. According to his attorneys, the court’s ruling was issued without prejudice, meaning that the government could appeal the decision or file the case, anew. The Trump administration fired Froes in April. In May, the Board of Immigration Appeals overturned her ruling, enabling the deportation proceedings to continue. On June 3, another immigration judge, Angela Munson, ordered him removed to Jordan. Mahdawi then appealed to the Court of Appeals for the First Circuit, arguing that Rubio's memo attacks constitutionally protected speech.

=== US Court of Appeals overturns order of federal judge ===
In July, a panel of the US Court of Appeals for the Second Circuit with the judges—two of whom were appointed by Donald Trump and one by George W. Bush—decided that Mahdawi's case should have been resolved in the immigration court system of the US Department of Justice, ordering Crawford's April 2025 ruling for Mahdawi's release to be overturned. The July ruling of the Second Circuit does not order his immediate re-arrest and the American Civil Liberties Union, which is representing Mahdawi, said there is no legal basis for his deportation or re-detention during the continuing appeals process.

== Reactions ==
All three of Vermont's members of Congress, Senator Bernie Sanders, Senator Peter Welch, and Representative Becca Balint, released a joint statement the day of the detention condemning it as "immoral, inhumane, and illegal". State Senator Rebecca White, who has known Mahdawi for around seven years, also condemned the arrest, stating, "I had told constituents, 'You are safe here.' And I can no longer say that."

Senator Welch met with Mahdawi, who was detained at the Northwest State Correctional Facility in St. Albans. During the meeting, Mahdawi stated that he was staying positive, expressing faith in the "ability of justice and the deep belief of democracy" in the United States. He also reiterated his support for peace, as well as his empathy for both Palestinians and Israelis.

Several Israeli citizens in New York signed an open letter opposing Mahdawi's detention. The letter noted that Mahdawi had actively worked to establish communication with Israelis. David Myers, former leader of the progressive New Israel Fund and a professor of Jewish history at the University of California, Los Angeles, similarly criticized Mahdawi's detention, stating, "This person constitutes a bridge, and we've torn that bridge down instead of embracing it."

A coalition of 135 Buddhist leaders and teachers signed an open letter demanding the release of Mahdawi and other student activists. A second letter, written by the Buddhist Association of the United States president Bhikkhu Bodhi, defended Mahdawi's character and faith; Bodhi and Mahdawi had met earlier in 2024.

An article in The Boston Globe profiled the high level of support for Mahdawi in his home state of Vermont, covering a substantial protest at his remote place of detention.

== See also ==
- Detention of Mahmoud Khalil, a case involving another Columbia University student
- Detention of Rümeysa Öztürk, a case involving a Tufts University student
- Visa and deportation controversies in the second Trump administration
- Deportation in the second Trump administration
