= Harold Eaton Jr. =

American judge (born 1955)

Duke Eaton

Associate Justice of the Vermont Supreme Court
- Incumbent
- Assumed office October 27, 2014
- Appointed by: Peter Shumlin
- Preceded by: Geoffrey W. Crawford

Personal details
- Born: Harold Edward Eaton, Jr. August 25, 1955 (age 69); Windsor, Vermont, U.S.
- Education: University of Vermont (BS); Vermont Law School (JD)

Harold Edward “Duke” Eaton Jr. (born August 25, 1955) is a Vermont lawyer and jurist who was appointed to the Vermont Supreme Court in 2014.

== Biography ==
Harold Edward Eaton Jr. (nicknamed "Duke") was born in Windsor, Vermont, on August 25, 1955. He attended elementary and junior high school in Woodstock and graduated from Woodstock Union High School in 1973. Eaton graduated from the University of Vermont in 1977 with a Bachelor of Science degree in education. He is a 1980 graduate of Vermont Law School.

From 1980 to 1982, Eaton was a deputy state's attorney for Chittenden County, and he was chief deputy state's attorney from 1982 to 1983. He practiced law in Rutland from 1983 to 1991. Eaton was a partner in Eaton & Hayes of Woodstock from 1991 to 2004.

Eaton was appointed a judge of the Vermont Superior Court by Governor Jim Douglas on April 16, 2004. On October 27, 2014, Governor Peter Shumlin swore Eaton in as an associate justice of the Vermont Supreme Court. Eaton replaced Geoffrey W. Crawford, who was appointed judge of the United States District Court for the District of Vermont.

Legal offices
Preceded by Geoffrey W. Crawford	Associate Justice of the Vermont Supreme Court; 2014–present	Incumbent
