= Peter W. Hall =

American judge (1948–2021)

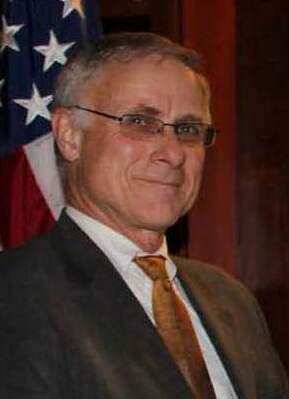
- Hall in 2012

Senior Judge of the United States Court of Appeals for the Second Circuit
- In office March 4, 2021 – March 11, 2021

Judge of the United States Court of Appeals for the Second Circuit
- In office July 7, 2004 – March 4, 2021
- Appointed by: George W. Bush
- Preceded by: Fred I. Parker
- Succeeded by: Beth Robinson

United States Attorney for the District of Vermont
- In office 2001–2004
- President: George W. Bush
- Preceded by: Charles Tetzlaff
- Succeeded by: David Kirby

Personal details
- Born: Peter Welles Hall; November 9, 1948 Hartford, Connecticut, U.S.
- Died: March 11, 2021 (aged 72) Rutland City, Vermont, U.S.
- Education: University of North Carolina at Chapel Hill (BA, MA); Cornell University (JD)

Peter Welles Hall (November 9, 1948 – March 11, 2021) was a United States circuit judge of the United States Court of Appeals for the Second Circuit.

== Biography ==
Born in Hartford, Connecticut, Hall began his university education at the University of North Carolina at Chapel Hill and received a Bachelor of Arts degree before going on to earn a Master of Arts degree in 1974. He earned his Juris Doctor at Cornell Law School in 1977. During his third year of law school, Hall served as President of the Cornell Legal Aid Clinic. After law school, Hall was a law clerk for Judge Albert Wheeler Coffrin of the United States District Court for the District of Vermont from 1977 to 1978.

Hall's legal career prior to joining the federal bench was divided between the United States Attorney's Office and private practice. He was an Assistant United States Attorney for Vermont from 1978 to 1986 before going into private practice. Following George W. Bush's election to the Presidency in 2001, Hall returned to the federal government, this time as the United States Attorney for the District of Vermont. He served in that position until his appointment to the Second Circuit.

== Federal judicial service ==
President Bush nominated Hall to the Second Circuit on December 9, 2003, to fill the vacancy left by Judge Fred I. Parker. Supported by Vermont Senators Jim Jeffords and Patrick Leahy, Hall's nomination was uncontroversial, and he was confirmed on June 24, 2004, by voice vote. He received his judicial commission on July 7, 2004. Hall took senior status on March 4, 2021 and died of cancer one week later, aged 72.

== Notable opinions ==
Hall wrote opinions on United States v. Wei Guang Wang, an immigration case; United States v. Feliz, an interpretation of the U.S. Supreme Court's Crawford v. Washington precedent; and United States v. Stewart, affirming the 2004 perjury conviction of Martha Stewart.

Legal offices
Preceded by Charles Tetzlaff	United States Attorney for the District of Vermont; 2001–2004	Succeeded by David Kirby
Preceded by Fred I. Parker	Judge of the United States Court of Appeals for the Second Circuit; 2004–2021	Succeeded by Beth Robinson
