= Courts of Vermont =

U.S. state courts

Courts of Vermont include:

State courts of Vermont

- Vermont Supreme Court
- Vermont Superior Court
  - Civil Division
  - Criminal Division
  - Environmental Division
  - Family Division
  - Probate Division
- Vermont Judicial Bureau

Federal courts located in Vermont

- United States District Court for the District of Vermont

== See also ==
- Judiciary of Vermont
