= Tristram J. Coffin =

American attorney (born 1963)

United States Attorney for the United States District Court for the District of Vermont
- In office 2009 – January 12, 2015
- President: Barack Obama
- Preceded by: Tom Anderson
- Succeeded by: Eric Miller

Personal details
- Born: May 16, 1963 (age 63) Camp Lejeune, North Carolina, U.S.
- Education: Wesleyan University (BA; Columbia University (JD)

Tristram J. Coffin (born May 16, 1963) is an American attorney from Vermont. He served as the United States attorney for the District of Vermont from 2009 to 2015.

== Education ==
Coffin was on born May 16, 1963, in Camp Lejeune, North Carolina. He graduated with a Bachelor of Arts from Wesleyan University in 1985 and earned a Juris Doctor from Columbia University Law School in 1989.

== Career ==
After graduating from law school, Coffin served as a law clerk for Judge Albert Wheeler Coffrin in the District of Vermont. From 1991 to 1994, he was a counsel to Senator Patrick Leahy on the Committee on the Judiciary, Subcommittee on Technology and the Law. Prior to that, he spent two years as a litigation associate at Hale and Dorr in Boston. From 1994 to 2006, he was an assistant United States attorney in the District of Vermont, serving in the Civil Division for four years and the Criminal Division for eight years. From 2006 to 2009 he was of counsel at Paul Frank & Collins, a law firm in Burlington, Vermont.

=== United States attorney ===
On May 15, 2009, Coffin was nominated to be the United States attorney for the United States District Court for the District of Vermont. He was recommended to the post by Senator Patrick Leahy. His nomination was received by the United States Senate Committee on the Judiciary on June 4, 2010. His nomination was reported out of committee on June 18, 2009. He was confirmed by the United States Senate by voice vote on August 7, 2009. On December 19, 2014, he announced his resignation, effective January 12, 2015.

=== Post-government career ===
In January 2015 Coffin joined the Burlington office of Vermont law firm Downs, Rachlin, Martin, LLC.

Legal offices
Preceded by Tom Anderson	United States Attorney for the United States District Court for the District of Vermont; 2009–2015	Succeeded by Eric Miller
