= Charles Tetzlaff =

American attorney from Vermont

United States Attorney for the District of Vermont
- In office 1993–2001
- Appointed by: Bill Clinton
- Preceded by: Charles Caruso
- Succeeded by: Peter W. Hall

Personal details
- Born: October 15, 1938 (age 87) Montpelier, Vermont, U.S.
- Party: Democratic
- Spouse: Joan Barbara Seugling (m. 1961)
- Children: 2
- Education: University of Vermont (BA); Boston University School of Law (LL.B.); New York University School of Law (LL.M.)
- Occupation: Attorney

Military service
- Allegiance: United States
- Service: United States Air Force
- Years of service: 1965–1968
- Rank: Captain
- Unit: Judge Advocate General's Corps

Charles Tetzlaff (born October 15, 1938) is an American attorney from Vermont. He is best known for his service as United States Attorney for the District of Vermont from 1993 to 2001.

== Early life ==
Charles Robert Tetzlaff was born in Montpelier, Vermont on October 15, 1938, the son of Donald and Harriet (Ranney) Tetzlaff. He was educated in Montpelier, Barre, and Burlington, and graduated from Montpelier High School in 1956. Tetzlaff received his Bachelor of Arts degree from the University of Vermont (UVM) in 1961. While in college, he participated in the Air Force Reserve Officer Training Corps and served as student commander of UVM's 870th Air Force Cadet Group. In addition, he was president of UVM's Sigma Phi fraternity and a member of the school's track and field team.

In 1963, Tetzlaff received his LL.B. degree from Boston University School of Law, and in 1964 he received a LL.M. from New York University School of Law. After attaining admission to the bar, beginning in 1965 Tetzlaff served in the United States Air Force. Assigned to the Judge Advocate General's Corps, Tetzlaff carried out assignments at Ernest Harmon Air Force Base in Stephenville, Newfoundland and Labrador and Robins Air Force Base in Warner Robins, Georgia. He attained the rank of captain, and received his discharge in 1968.

== Career ==
From 1968 to 1970, Tetzlaff served as deputy to Patrick Leahy during Leahy's service as State's Attorney of Chittenden County, Vermont. He subsequently became a partner in the Burlington law firm of Latham, Eastman, Schweyer & Tetzlaff, where he focused on both criminal and civil litigation and appeared in both federal and state courts. Among the notable cases in which Tetzlaff played a role was the criminal defense of John A. Zacarro Jr., the son of Geraldine Ferraro and John A. Zaccaro Sr., when the younger Zacarro was charged in 1986 with selling cocaine while a student at Middlebury College.

In 1993, President Bill Clinton nominated Tetzlaff to serve as Vermont's United States Attorney. He continued in this position until 2001, when he became general counsel of the United States Sentencing Commission. The high profile cases Tetzlaff oversaw as U.S. Attorney included the investigation into and subsequent guilty pleas from Joseph C. Palmisano, a prominent attorney who defrauded clients out of nearly $8 million and served 13 years of a 15 year prison sentence.

At the federal level, Tetzlaff was a member of the U.S. Attorney General's Advisory Committee, a member of its Subcommittee on Sentencing Guidelines, chairman of its Subcommittee on Health Care Fraud, and co-chairman of its Border Subcommittee. At the state level, Tetzlaff served as chairman of the Governor's Sentencing Study Commission and the Governor's Bail Amendment Task Force. In addition, he was a member of the Vermont Board of Bar Examiners and the Vermont State Police Advisory Commission. Tetzlaff also served as a trustee of Vermont Legal Aid.

After retiring, Tetzlaff was a resident of South Burlington, Vermont.

== Family ==
Tetzlaff married Joan Barbara Seugling of Little Falls, New Jersey on July 1, 1961. They are the parents of two children, Julie and Carl.
