= James L. Oakes =

American judge (1924–2007)

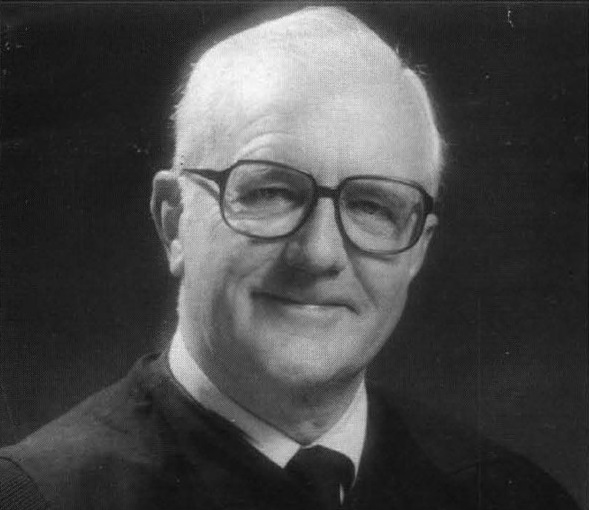
- Oakes, c. 1992

Senior Judge of the United States Court of Appeals for the Second Circuit
- In office June 30, 1992 – October 13, 2007

Chief Judge of the United States Court of Appeals for the Second Circuit
- In office 1989–1992
- Preceded by: Wilfred Feinberg
- Succeeded by: Thomas Joseph Meskill

Judge of the United States Court of Appeals for the Second Circuit
- In office May 27, 1971 – June 30, 1992
- Appointed by: Richard Nixon
- Preceded by: Sterry R. Waterman
- Succeeded by: Fred I. Parker

Judge of the United States District Court for the District of Vermont
- In office April 24, 1970 – June 5, 1971
- Appointed by: Richard Nixon
- Preceded by: Ernest W. Gibson Jr.
- Succeeded by: James Stuart Holden

19th Attorney General of Vermont
- In office 1967–1969
- Governor: Philip H. Hoff
- Preceded by: John P. Connarn
- Succeeded by: Jim Jeffords

Member of the Vermont Senate from the Windham district
- In office 1961–1965
- Preceded by: Hugh Agnew
- Succeeded by: Stoyan Christowe

Personal details
- Born: James Lowell Oakes; February 21, 1924 Springfield, Illinois, U.S.
- Died: October 13, 2007 (aged 83) Martha's Vineyard, Massachusetts, U.S.
- Party: Republican
- Education: Harvard University (AB, LLB)

James Lowell Oakes (February 21, 1924 – October 13, 2007) was a United States circuit judge of the United States Court of Appeals for the Second Circuit and previously was a United States district judge of the United States District Court for the District of Vermont.

== Education and career ==
Born on February 21, 1924, in Springfield, Illinois, Oakes received an Artium Baccalaureus degree in 1945 from Harvard University and a Bachelor of Laws in 1947 from Harvard Law School. He served as a law clerk for Judge Harrie B. Chase of the United States Court of Appeals for the Second Circuit from 1947 to 1948 and from 1949 to 1950. He was in private practice in San Francisco, California from 1948 to 1949. He was in private practice in Brattleboro, Vermont from 1950 to 1966 and from 1969 to 1970. He was a member of the Vermont Senate from 1961 to 1965. He was Attorney General of the State of Vermont from 1967 to 1969.

== Federal judicial service ==
Oakes was nominated by President Richard Nixon on March 31, 1970, to a seat on the United States District Court for the District of Vermont vacated by Judge Ernest W. Gibson Jr. He was confirmed by the United States Senate on April 23, 1970, and received his commission on April 24, 1970. His service terminated on June 5, 1971, due to his elevation to the Second Circuit.

Oakes was nominated by President Nixon on May 3, 1971, to a seat on the United States Court of Appeals for the Second Circuit vacated by Judge Sterry R. Waterman. He was confirmed by the Senate on May 20, 1971, and received his commission on May 27, 1971. He served as Chief Judge from 1989 to 1992 and served as a member of the Judicial Conference of the United States for the same period. He assumed senior status on June 30, 1992. His service terminated on October 13, 2007, due to his death in Martha's Vineyard, Massachusetts.

== Other service and legacy ==
Oakes served as a member of the Vermont Law School Board of Trustees from 1976 until 1994. His many incisive opinions helped to shape Vermont's singular role in the development of environmental law, including his ruling in Conservation Society of Southern Vermont v. Volpe (the Route 7 Case) and Southview Associates v. Bongartz (the Deeryard Case).

Party political offices
Preceded by Charles E. Gibson Jr.	Republican nominee for Vermont Attorney General; 1966	Succeeded by Jim Jeffords
Legal offices
Preceded by John P. Connarn	Attorney General of Vermont; 1967–1969	Succeeded by Jim Jeffords
Preceded by Ernest W. Gibson Jr.	Judge of the United States District Court for the District of Vermont; 1970–1971	Succeeded by James Stuart Holden
Preceded by Sterry R. Waterman	Judge of the United States Court of Appeals for the Second Circuit; 1971–1992	Succeeded by Fred I. Parker
Preceded by Wilfred Feinberg	Chief Judge of the United States Court of Appeals for the Second Circuit; 1989–1992	Succeeded by Thomas Joseph Meskill
