= John R. Edwards (US Marshal) =

US Marshal for Vermont

US Marshal for the District of Vermont
- In office 2002–2009
- Nominated by: George W. Bush
- Preceded by: John H. Sinclair
- Succeeded by: David E. Demag

Member of the Vermont House of Representatives
- In office 1995–2001 Serving with John E. Robb
- Preceded by: John E. Robb, Nancy Christopher
- Succeeded by: John Winters, Kathy Labelle Lavoie
- Constituency: Franklin–Grand Isle–1

Personal details
- Born: 1942 (age 83–84) Bellows Falls, Vermont, US
- Party: Republican
- Spouse(s): Linda Mary Lacoste (m. 1966–1981) Deanna Mary (Considine) Fuller (m. 1987)
- Children: 2
- Education: Castleton State College
- Profession: Law enforcement officer

Military service
- Service: United States Navy
- Years of service: 1960–1963
- Rank: Radarman
- Unit: USS Spiegel Grove

John R. Edwards (born 1942) is a retired American law enforcement officer from Vermont. A veteran of the United States Navy, he spent his career with the Vermont State Police, from which he retired as a lieutenant. He then operated a private investigation firm; a Republican, he served in the Vermont House of Representatives from 1995 to 2001. In 2002, he was appointed US Marshal for the District of Vermont, and he served until 2009.

== Early life ==
John Robert Edwards was born in Bellows Falls, Vermont in 1942, the son of Roland E. Edwards and Ursula Jane (Brosnan) Edwards. He was raised and educated in Bellows Falls and Saxtons River and graduated from Bellows Falls High School in 1960. After high school, Edwards served in the United States Navy for three years. After training as a radarman, he served aboard USS Spiegel Grove. Following his active duty military service, Edwards continued to serve in the United States Navy Reserve.

=== Family ===
In 1966, Edwards married Linda Mary Lacoste; they were the parents of two children, and she died in 1981. In 1987, he married Deanna Mary (Considine) Fuller, the mother of four children with her first husband, who died in 1984.

== Career ==
After his Navy service, Edwards joined the Vermont State Police (VSP). In 1973, he received an associate's degree in criminal justice from Castleton State College, and he received his bachelor's degree from Castleton in 1975. He remained with the VSP until 1992 and retired as a lieutenant. As he worked through the ranks, Edwards' postings included supervisor of the St. Albans barracks and supervisor of detectives for northwestern Vermont.

After retiring, he resided in Swanton, served on the Missisquoi School Board, and operated a private investigation firm, JRE Investigations. A Republican, in 1994, Edwards was elected to the Vermont House of Representatives; he was reelected in 1996 and 1998, and served from 1997 to 2001. Edwards was an unsuccessful candidate for renomination in 2000, with his defeat attributed to backlash over his support for Vermont's Civil Unions law.

In January 2001, Republican George W. Bush became president and US Senator Jim Jeffords recommended Edwards for appointment as US Marshal for the District of Vermont. The nomination was delayed after Jeffords left the Republican Party in May 2001 and became an independent. Bush made the nomination in early 2002, and Edwards was confirmed in March. Edwards served until 2009 and was succeeded by David Demag.
