= David E. Demag =

US marshal for Vermont

United States Marshal for Vermont
- In office 2009–2017
- Nominated by: Barack Obama
- Preceded by: John R. Edwards
- Succeeded by: Bradley J. LaRose

Personal details
- Born: 1950 (age 75–76) Burlington, Vermont, US
- Spouse(s): Donna Marie Trombley (m. 1970–2008) Lydia A. Zellers
- Children: 2
- Education: Community College of Vermont; Trinity College of Vermont
- Profession: Law enforcement officer

David E. Demag (b. 1950) is a retired American law enforcement officer from Vermont. A longtime member of the police department in Burlington, he later served as chief of police in St. Albans and Essex. In 2009, he was appointed United States Marshal for Vermont, and he served until 2019.

== Biography ==
David Edward Demag was born in Burlington, Vermont in 1950, a son of Bernard J. Demag Sr. and Alice Mabel (Renault) Demag. He was raised and educated in Winooski and graduated from Winooski High School in 1969. After high school, he attended Champlain College and worked for Hugh Ramsden, a Burlington paint and wallpaper retailer.

In 1971, Demag joined the Burlington Police Department (BPD). He remained with BPD until 1996, and advanced to the rank of commander. In 1974, he was one of the police officers who participated in the sting that caught Paul Lawrence, an undercover police officer for numerous departments in Vermont. Lawrence falsely claimed to have purchased illegal drugs from several people, resulting in numerous convictions based on his perjury.

In 1989, Demag received his associate degree from Community College of Vermont. In 2000, he received his bachelor's degree from Trinity College of Vermont. After retiring from the BPD, Demag served as chief of police in St. Albans from 1996 to 2001. From 2001 to 2008, he was police chief in Essex.

In 2009, President Barack Obama nominated Demag to serve as United States Marshal for Vermont, based on the recommendation of US senator Patrick Leahy. He continued in this position until retiring in 2017. In retirement, Demag became a resident of Milton, Vermont and Englewood, Florida.
