= John Garvan Murtha =

American judge (born 1941)

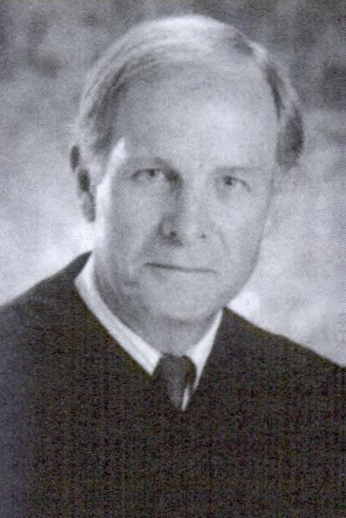
- From the July 2001 issue of The Third Branch

Senior Judge of the United States District Court for the District of Vermont
- Incumbent
- Assumed office June 30, 2009

Chief Judge of the United States District Court for the District of Vermont
- In office 1995–2002
- Preceded by: Fred I. Parker
- Succeeded by: William K. Sessions III

Judge of the United States District Court for the District of Vermont
- In office May 26, 1995 – June 30, 2009
- Appointed by: Bill Clinton
- Preceded by: Franklin S. Billings Jr.
- Succeeded by: Christina Reiss

Personal details
- Born: March 3, 1941 (age 84); Hartford, Connecticut, U.S.
- Education: Yale University (BA); University of Connecticut (LLB); Georgetown University (LLM)
- Profession: Attorney
- Nickname: "Gar"

John Garvan Murtha (born March 3, 1941) is an inactive Senior United States district judge of the United States District Court for the District of Vermont.

== Education and career ==
J. Garvan Murtha was born in Hartford, Connecticut on March 3, 1941. He received a Bachelor of Arts from Yale University in 1963, a Bachelor of Laws from the University of Connecticut School of Law in 1968, and a Master of Laws from Georgetown University Law Center in 1970. He served as a Peace Corps volunteer in Colombia, South America from 1963 to 1965 and was an E. Barrett Prettyman fellow at the Georgetown University Law Center from 1968 to 1970. Murtha served as a Deputy State's Attorney of Windham County, Vermont and as an Environmental Commissioner, Vermont District II, from 1970 to 1973. From 1973 to 1995, he was in private practice as a partner at Kristensen, Cummings & Murtha in Brattleboro, Vermont. He also served on the Vermont Judicial Nominating Board from 1980 to 1986, the Vermont Judicial Nominating Advisory Commission for the United States District Court and Second Circuit Court of Appeals in 1989 and 1992, and as chairman of the Vermont Commission on Low-Level Nuclear Waste from 1987 to 1990.

=== Federal judicial service ===
On April 4, 1995, President Bill Clinton nominated Murtha to a seat on the United States District Court for the District of Vermont vacated by Franklin S. Billings, Jr. Murtha was confirmed by the United States Senate on May 25, 1995, received his commission on May 26, 1995, and served as chief judge from 1995 to 2002. He assumed senior status on June 30, 2009, and inactive status on October 1, 2017, meaning that while he remains a federal judge, he will no longer hear cases or maintain chambers. However, Murtha remains a member of the U.S. Judicial Conference Committee on the Judicial Branch, and served as a member of the U.S. Judicial Conference Standing Committee on the Rules of Practice and Procedure from 1999 to 2006, and as chairman of its Style Subcommittee when the Federal Rules of Civil Procedure were restyled. Murtha has indicated he will continue to participate in committees and other functions of the federal judiciary. The United States Courthouse in Brattleboro will permanently close the same day as part of a nationwide effort by the federal judiciary to reduce its total office space.

=== Decisions ===
Murtha, sitting by designation on the United States Court of Appeals for the Second Circuit, penned a dissent in John Wiley & Sons, Inc. v. Kirtsaeng, 654 F.3d 210 (2d Cir. 2011), an important case involving application of the first sale doctrine of copyright law to works manufactured outside the United States. Kirtsaeng, who moved to the United States from Thailand in 1997, sold foreign-edition textbooks to subsidize the cost of his education at Cornell University. The United States Supreme Court reversed, agreeing with Judge Murtha that the first sale doctrine does apply. Kirtsaeng v. John Wiley & Sons, Inc., 568 U.S. 519, 133 S. Ct. 1351 (2013).

Murtha's decision in Entergy Nuclear Vermont Yankee, LLC v. Shumlin, 838 F. Supp. 2d 183 (D. Vt. 2012), an important case involving preemption of state law by the Atomic Energy Act, permanently enjoined Vermont from enforcing Act 160 or 74 to shut down Vermont Yankee, and was substantially affirmed by the United States Court of Appeals for the Second Circuit. Entergy Nuclear Vermont Yankee, LLC v. Shumlin, 733 F3d 393 (2d Cir. 2013) (affirming permanent injunction but finding dormant commerce clause challenge not ripe for judicial review).

Murtha's decision in National Wildlife Federation v. Norton vacated and remanded the United States Fish & Wildlife Service’s final rule to reclassify and remove the gray wolf from the list of endangered and threatened wildlife in portions of the northeast. 386 F. Supp. 2d 553 (D. Vt. 2005). Judge Murtha held the final rule that combined the Northeastern and Western Great Lakes Distinct Population Segments and eliminating protection and recovery efforts in the former Northeastern Distinct Population Segment deviated substantially from the proposed rule and therefore failed to provide the public with adequate notice and opportunity to comment. He also held the final rule was an arbitrary and capricious application of the Endangered Species Act because it downgraded the gray wolf from endangered to threatened status in two Distinct Population Segments. Id.

== Sources ==
Legal offices
Preceded by Franklin S. Billings Jr.	Judge of the United States District Court for the District of Vermont; 1995–2009	Succeeded by Christina Reiss
Preceded by Fred I. Parker	Chief Judge of the United States District Court for the District of Vermont; 1995–2002	Succeeded by William K. Sessions III
