= John Hall (US Marshal) =

US Marshal for Vermont

John Hall (born 1970) is an American law enforcement officer. A longtime member of the United States Marshals Service, he has served as acting United States Marshal for Vermont since July 2024.

== Career ==
As of 2024, Hall was 54 and had been a marshal for 28 years. His career includes postings in New Mexico and Vermont. In addition, he was an attaché in the Dominican Republic for five years. He returned to the district of Vermont in 2014 and was appointed chief deputy. In July 2024, Vermont's US marshal, Bradley J. LaRose retired. Hall was named acting marshal pending the selection of a permanent replacement.
