= John P. Connarn =

American politician

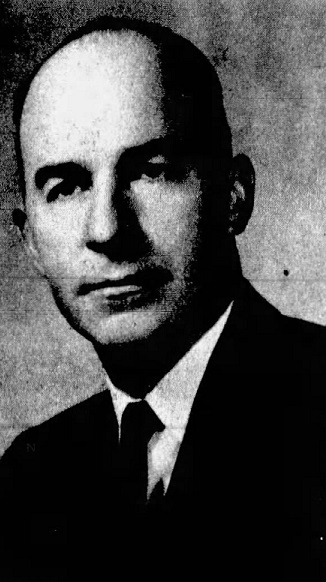
- Newspaper advertisement photo from 1966 reelection campaign

Vermont Attorney General
- In office January 7, 1965 – January 4, 1967
- Governor: Philip H. Hoff
- Preceded by: Charles E. Gibson Jr.
- Succeeded by: James L. Oakes

Judge of the Vermont District Court
- In office January 27, 1967 – September 30, 1985
- Preceded by: None (position created)
- Succeeded by: Shireen A. Fisher

Judge of the Montpelier, Vermont Municipal Court
- In office February 1, 1963 – January 1, 1965
- Preceded by: Joseph W. Foti
- Succeeded by: Grace J. McGuire

Member of the Vermont House of Representatives from Northfield
- In office January 8, 1957 – January 3, 1961
- Preceded by: Glendon N. King
- Succeeded by: Howard N. Hanson

Personal details
- Born: John Patrick Connarn; July 8, 1917 Brattleboro, Vermont, U.S.
- Died: March 26, 2002 (aged 84) Berlin, Vermont, U.S.
- Resting place: Aldrich Cemetery, Northfield, Vermont, U.S.
- Party: Democratic
- Spouses: Phyllis Pitcher; Alicia Stonebreaker; Stanislawa (Barbara) Prostacka Michalek
- Children: 3
- Education: Norwich University (BA); Portland University (LLB)
- Profession: Attorney
- Military career
- Service: United States Army
- Service years: 1941–1947
- Rank: Captain
- Service number: O-414143
- Units: 87th Infantry Regiment; 179th Infantry Regiment
- Wars: World War II
- Awards: Combat Infantryman Badge; Purple Heart; European–African–Middle Eastern Campaign Medal with three campaign stars

John Patrick Connarn (July 8, 1917 – March 26, 2002) was an attorney, politician, and judge from Northfield, Vermont who served as the state Attorney General from 1965 to 1967. He was the first Democrat to hold the position.

== Early life ==
John Patrick Connarn was born in Brattleboro, Vermont on July 8, 1917, the son of Frederick M. Connarn and Margaret (Holland) Connarn. He was raised and educated in Northfield, Vermont, and graduated from Northfield High School in 1936. Connarn subsequently attended Norwich University, from which he received his bachelor's degree in 1941.

== Military service ==
After college, Connarn joined the United States Army to serve during World War II. He served initially with the 3rd Cavalry Regiment at Fort Myer, Virginia. When the army created unites including the 87th Infantry Regiment to train for mountain and winter warfare, Connarn volunteered, and served at locations including Camp Hale, Colorado. Connarn was subsequently assigned to the 2nd Cavalry Division at Fort Clark, Texas.

Following additional training at Fort Riley, Kansas, in 1943 Connarn was assigned to the 179th Infantry Regiment, a unit of the 45th Infantry Division. He served in the North African campaign, including the post-Operation Torch occupation of sites in Morocco and Algeria. The 179th Infantry took part in the August 1944 Operation Dragoon invasion of southern France, and took part in combat as a platoon leader in the regiment's Company E. He took part in battles that followed the Dragoon landings, and was severely wounded in France in October 1944.

Connarn underwent extensive recuperation at several military hospitals, including Naples, Italy, Clinton, Iowa, and Fort Carson, Colorado. He attained the rank of captain, and remained in the army until being medically retired in 1947. Connarn was a recipient of the Purple Heart, Combat Infantryman Badge, and European–African–Middle Eastern Campaign Medal with three campaign stars.

== Start of career ==
Connarn graduated from the Portland University Law School in 1952 and became an attorney in Northfield. A Democrat, he was elected to the Vermont House of Representatives in 1956 and served two two-year terms, 1957 to 1961.

In 1963, Connarn was appointed judge of Montpelier's municipal court, and he served until 1965. in 1964 he was elected Vermont Attorney General and served two years, 1965 to 1967. Connarn was an unsuccessful candidate for reelection in 1966.

== Later career ==
In 1967, Connarn was appointed a Judge of the Vermont District Court, and he served until his retirement in 1985. After leaving the bench, Connarn owned and operated Northfield's Margaret Holland Inn and served two terms on the local school board. He was a scout master in the local Boy Scout troop, president of the Norwich University Alumni Association, and was active in Northfield's American Legion Post.

== Death and burial ==
Connarn died in Berlin, Vermont on March 26, 2002. He was buried at Aldrich Cemetery (West Hill Cemetery) in Northfield.

== Family ==
Connarn was married first to Phyllis Pitcher, and later to artist Alicia Stonebreaker. After his second wife's death, he married Stanislawa (Barbara) Prostacka Michalek. He was the father of two daughters and a son, as well as four stepsons.

Party political offices
Preceded by Robert W. Larrow	Democratic nominee for Vermont Attorney General; 1964, 1966	Succeeded by Thomas P. Whalen
Legal offices
Preceded by Charles E. Gibson Jr.	Attorney General of Vermont; 1965–1967	Succeeded by James L. Oakes
