= Bernard J. Leddy =

American judge (1910–1972)

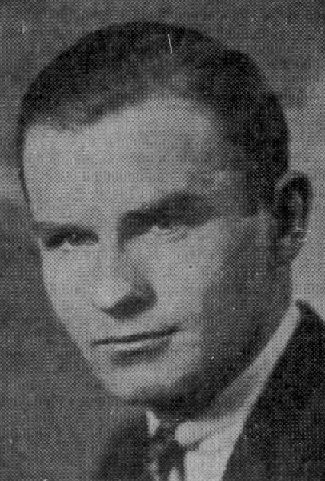
- "Young Democrats to Hold Convention in St. Albans". Burlington Free Press (Burlington, VT), August 23, 1940.

Chief Judge of the United States District Court for the District of Vermont
- In office 1969–1972
- Preceded by: Ernest W. Gibson Jr.
- Succeeded by: James Stuart Holden

Judge of the United States District Court for the District of Vermont
- In office August 25, 1966 – January 9, 1972
- Appointed by: Lyndon B. Johnson
- Preceded by: Seat established by 80 Stat. 75
- Succeeded by: Albert Wheeler Coffrin

Member of the Burlington Board of Aldermen from Ward 4
- In office April 1, 1935 – November 9, 1940
- Preceded by: Francis D. Foley
- Succeeded by: John Edward Moran

Personal details
- Born: Bernard Joseph Leddy; March 18, 1910 Underhill, Vermont, US
- Died: January 9, 1972 (aged 61) Burlington, Vermont, US
- Resting place: Resurrection Park Cemetery; South Burlington, Vermont, US
- Party: Democratic
- Spouse: Johannah (Mahoney) Leddy (m. 1939-1972, his death)
- Relations: T. J. Donovan (grandson)
- Children: 5 (including James P. Leddy and Johannah Leddy Donovan
- Education: Saint Michael's College (AB); Boston College (LLB)
- Profession: Attorney

Bernard Joseph Leddy (March 18, 1910 – January 9, 1972) was a United States district judge of the United States District Court for the District of Vermont.

== Education and career ==
Leddy was born in Underhill, Vermont on March 18, 1910, a son of John T. Leddy and Anna (Marlow) Leddy. Leddy was educated in the parochial schools of Underhill and Burlington, and was a 1927 graduate of Burlington's Cathedral High School. He received his Artium Baccalaureus degree from Saint Michael's College in 1931, and his Bachelor of Laws from Boston College Law School in 1934. He was a Burlington alderman from 1935 to 1940. He was an Assistant United States Attorney for Vermont from 1940 to 1954.

In 1946, Leddy was named chair of the Burlington Zoning Commission. In 1955, he was elected chair of the Saint Michael's College board of trustees. In 1956, he was elected chair of the Chittenden County Bar Association. Leddy was a civilian aide for the United States Secretary of the Army from 1962 to 1966.

== Gubernatorial campaign ==
Leddy was the 1958 Democratic nominee for Governor of Vermont. At a time when Vermont was overwhelmingly Republican, Leddy lost to Robert Stafford by only 719 votes (50.3% to 49.7%). Leddy's strong showing in the governor's race, coupled with the win of Democrat William H. Meyer in the election for Vermont's at-large seat in the United States House of Representatives, was an indicator that the state's Democrats were growing in strength after more than 100 years of Republican dominance in statewide elections.

== Federal judicial service ==
Leddy was nominated by President Lyndon B. Johnson on August 16, 1966, to the United States District Court for the District of Vermont, to a new seat created by 80 Stat. 75. He was confirmed by the United States Senate on August 25, 1966, and received his commission the same day. He served as Chief Judge from 1969 to 1972. His service was terminated on January 9, 1972, due to his death following a heart attack at his Burlington home. He is buried at Resurrection Park Cemetery in South Burlington.

== Family ==
In 1939, Leddy married Johannah (Mahoney) Leddy. They were the parents of sons John T. and the Reverend James P., and three daughters, Ann, Johannah, and Mary. Johannah was the wife of Thomas Donovan. Ann is the wife of Alan Charron.

Leddy's son James P. Leddy was a member of the Vermont State Senate. His daughter Johannah Leddy Donovan has served in the Vermont House of Representatives since 2001. His grandson T. J. Donovan was the State's Attorney for Chittenden County, Vermont, prior to winning election as Vermont Attorney General in 2016.

== Honor ==
A park in Burlington is named in Leddy's honor.

== Sources ==
Party political offices
Preceded by William J. Brown	Democratic nominee for Vermont Attorney General; 1938	Succeeded by Harry W. Witters
Preceded by E. Frank Branon	Democratic nominee for Governor of Vermont; 1958	Succeeded by Russell Niquette
Legal offices
Preceded by Seat established by 80 Stat. 75	Judge of the United States District Court for the District of Vermont; 1966–1972	Succeeded by Albert Wheeler Coffrin
Preceded by Ernest W. Gibson Jr.	Chief Judge of the United States District Court for the District of Vermont; 1969–1972	Succeeded by James Stuart Holden
