= Geoffrey W. Crawford =

American judge (born 1954)

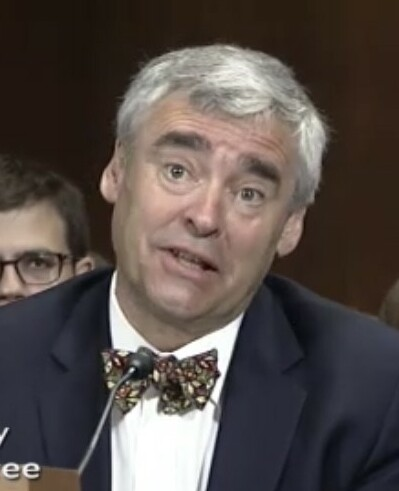
- Crawford in 2014

Senior Judge of the United States District Court for the District of Vermont
- Incumbent
- Assumed office August 9, 2024

Chief Judge of the United States District Court for the District of Vermont
- In office December 21, 2017 – July 20, 2024
- Preceded by: Christina Reiss
- Succeeded by: Christina Reiss

Judge of the United States District Court for the District of Vermont
- In office August 4, 2014 – August 9, 2024
- Appointed by: Barack Obama
- Preceded by: William K. Sessions III
- Succeeded by: Mary Kay Lanthier

Associate Justice of the Vermont Supreme Court
- In office October 16, 2013 – August 4, 2014
- Appointed by: Peter Shumlin
- Preceded by: Brian L. Burgess
- Succeeded by: Harold Eaton Jr.

Personal details
- Born: Geoffrey William Crawford; July 20, 1954 (age 72) Ann Arbor, Michigan, U.S.
- Party: Democratic
- Education: Yale University (BA); Harvard University (JD)

Geoffrey William Crawford (born July 20, 1954) is a senior United States district judge of the United States District Court for the District of Vermont and former associate justice of the Vermont Supreme Court.

== Biography ==
Crawford was born in 1954 in Ann Arbor, Michigan. He received a Bachelor of Arts degree, cum laude, in 1977 from Yale University. He received a Juris Doctor, cum laude, in 1980 from Harvard Law School. He began his legal career as a law clerk to Judge Albert Wheeler Coffrin of the United States District Court for the District of Vermont from 1980 to 1981. From 1981 to 1984, he was an associate at the law firm of Burlingham, Underwood & Lord in New York City and from 1984 to 1987, he was an associate at the law firm of Manchester & O'Neill in Vermont. From 1987 to 2002, he was a partner with Jerome O'Neill at the law firm of O'Neil, Crawford & Green. He served as a judge of the Vermont Superior Court from 2002 to 2013. In 2013 he succeeded Brian L. Burgess as an associate justice of the Vermont Supreme Court, and he served until 2014.

=== Federal judicial service ===
On May 20, 2014, President Barack Obama nominated Crawford to serve as a United States district judge of the United States District Court for the District of Vermont, to the seat being vacated by Judge William K. Sessions III, who subsequently assumed senior status on June 15, 2014. Crawford was recommended to President Obama, on March 24, 2014, by Senator Patrick J. Leahy after being evaluated by a nonpartisan Judicial Selection Commission established by Senator Leahy and Senator Bernie Sanders. A hearing on his nomination before the United States Senate Judiciary Committee was held on June 4, 2014. On June 12, 2014 his nomination was reported out of committee by a voice vote. On June 19, 2014 Senate Majority Leader Harry Reid filed a motion to invoke cloture on the nomination. On June 23, 2014, the United States Senate invoked cloture on his nomination by a 52–32 vote. On June 24, 2014, his nomination was confirmed by a 95–0 vote. He received his judicial commission on August 4, 2014. He took the oath of office during his judicial investiture ceremony on August 12, 2014, and he maintained chambers in the United States Courthouse in Rutland, Vermont. Harold Eaton Jr. succeed him on the Vermont Supreme Court. He served as chief judge from 2017 to 2024. He assumed senior status on August 9, 2024.

On April 30, he ordered the release of Mohsen Mahdawi, a Palestinian student at Columbia University detained under the Trump administration, stating that "the two weeks of detention so far demonstrate great harm to a person who has been charged with no crime."

Legal offices
Preceded by William K. Sessions III	Judge of the United States District Court for the District of Vermont; 2014–2024	Succeeded by Mary Kay Lanthier
Preceded by Christina Reiss	Chief Judge of the United States District Court for the District of Vermont; 2017–2024	Succeeded by Christina Reiss
