= Christina Reiss =

American judge (born 1962)

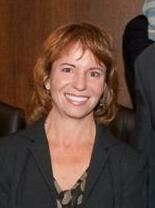
- Reiss in 2009

Chief Judge of the United States District Court for the District of Vermont
- Incumbent
- Assumed office July 21, 2024
- Preceded by: Geoffrey W. Crawford
- In office December 21, 2010 – December 20, 2017
- Preceded by: William K. Sessions III
- Succeeded by: Geoffrey W. Crawford

Judge of the United States District Court for the District of Vermont
- Incumbent
- Assumed office December 21, 2009
- Appointed by: Barack Obama
- Preceded by: John Garvan Murtha

Personal details
- Born: September 3, 1962 (age 63) Denver, Colorado, U.S.
- Education: Saint Michael's College (BA); University of Arizona (JD)

Christina Clair Reiss (born September 3, 1962) is the chief United States district judge of the United States District Court for the District of Vermont. She is the first female judge to serve in the District of Vermont.

== Early life and education ==
Born in Denver, Reiss moved to Essex Center, Vermont in 1967, where she attended elementary and secondary schools. She earned a Bachelor of Arts degree from Saint Michael's College in Colchester, Vermont in 1984 and a Juris Doctor from the University of Arizona College of Law in 1989.

== Career ==
From 1989 until 1990, Reiss clerked for the Maine Supreme Judicial Court, and from 1990 until 1992, Reiss practiced with the law firm of Perkins, Thompson, Hinckley & Keddy in Portland, Maine. From 1992 until 2001, Reiss practiced law with the firm of Sheehey, Brue, Gray & Furlong in Burlington, Vermont. From 2001 until 2004, Reiss was a partner with the law firm of Gravel and Shea in Burlington.

=== State judicial service ===
In August 2004, Reiss was appointed to the state bench as a district judge.

=== Federal judicial service ===
In July 2009, United States Senator Patrick Leahy announced that he had recommended that Reiss be nominated by President Barack Obama to the United States District Court for the District of Vermont, to fill the seat vacated by Judge John Garvan Murtha, who assumed senior status. On October 9, 2009, Obama announced his intent to nominate Reiss to the district court seat. Her nomination was formally submitted to the United States Senate on October 13, 2009. The United States Senate confirmed Reiss by unanimous consent on November 21, 2009. She received her judicial commission on December 21, 2009. She served an initial term as chief judge from 2010 to 2017 and began a second on July 21, 2024.

Legal offices
Preceded by John Garvan Murtha	Judge of the United States District Court for the District of Vermont; 2009–present	Incumbent
Preceded by William K. Sessions III	Chief Judge of the United States District Court for the District of Vermont; 2010–2017	Succeeded by Geoffrey W. Crawford
Preceded by Geoffrey W. Crawford	Chief Judge of the United States District Court for the District of Vermont; 2024–present	Incumbent
