= Bradley J. LaRose =

US Marshal for Vermont

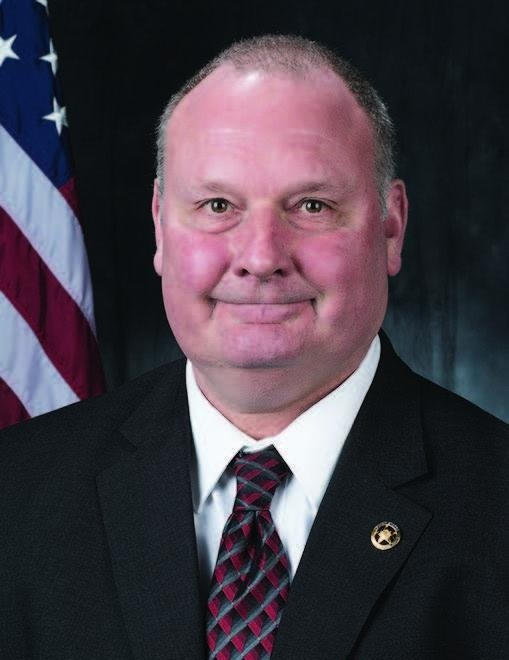
- LaRose as Vermont's US Marshal in 2019

United States Marshal for Vermont
- In office 2019–2024
- Nominated by: Barack Obama
- Preceded by: David E. Demag
- Succeeded by: John Hall (acting)

Personal details
- Born: 1957 (age 68–69) Burlington, Vermont, US
- Spouse: Karin Lynn Cieplicki (m. 1983)
- Children: 2
- Education: Champlain College
- Profession: Law enforcement officer

Bradley J. LaRose (born 1957) is a retired American law enforcement officer from Vermont. A longtime member of the police department in Essex, he advanced to the chief's position, which he held from 2012 to 2018. He was then appointed to serve as Vermont's US marshal, and he held this position from 2019 to 2024.

== Biography ==
Bradley Jay LaRose was born in Burlington, Vermont in 1957, a son of Frederick A. LaRose and Catherine M. (Poland) LaRose. He was raised in Burlington and Williston, and graduated from Champlain Valley Union High School in 1975. LaRose began his career as a law enforcement officer when he joined the police department in Williston as a part-time officer. In 1978, he became a fulltime officer with the Burlington police. After high school, LaRose received an associate degree in law enforcement from Champlain College.

In 1980, LaRose joined the newly formed police department in Essex as a patrol officer. He became a resident of Richmond, served in Essex until 2018, and advanced through the ranks to sergeant, lieutenant, captain, and acting chief before becoming the department's chief in 2012. He completed his Bachelor of Science degree in professional studies at Champlain College in 2003. In addition, LaRose is a graduate of the FBI National Academy.

In January 2018, Senator Patrick Leahy and Governor Phil Scott recommended LaRose to President Donald Trump for appointment as Vermont's US Marshal. Trump made the nomination in June 2018. LaRose was confirmed by the US Senate in January 2019 and succeeded David E. Demag. He served until July 2024, when he retired and was succeeded by acting marshal John Hall.
