= Vermont Public Service Department =

U.S. state government agency

The Vermont Public Service Department is an agency within the executive branch of Vermont state government that is charged with representing the public interest in energy, telecommunications, and other utility matters.
