= Mary Kay Lanthier =

American judge (born 1971)

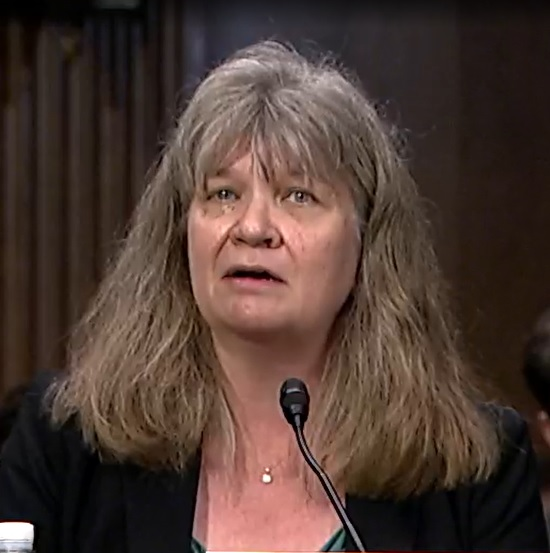

Judge of the United States District Court for the District of Vermont
- Incumbent
- Assumed office September 12, 2024
- Appointed by: Joe Biden
- Preceded by: Geoffrey W. Crawford

Personal details
- Born: 1971 (age 54–55) Rutland, Vermont, U.S.
- Education: Amherst College (BA); Northeastern University (JD)

Mary Kay Lanthier (born 1971) is an American lawyer who is serving as a United States district judge of the United States District Court for the District of Vermont.

== Education ==
Lanthier received a Bachelor of Arts from Amherst College in 1993 and a Juris Doctor from Northeastern University School of Law in 1996.

== Career ==
From 1996 to 1998, Lanthier served as a law clerk for the judges of the Vermont Trial Court in the Chittenden County and Addison County Courts. From 1998 to 2000, she was as an associate at Keiner & Dumont, PC and was a public defender with the Addison County Public Defender's Office from 2000 to 2003. From 2003 to 2007, she was a partner at Marsh & Wagner, PC. From 2007 to 2024, she was the supervising attorney in the Rutland County Public Defender's Office. She is a past chair of the Vermont chapter of the American College of Trial Lawyers. From 2017 to 2023, she was an adjunct professor at the Vermont Law and Graduate School.

=== Federal judicial service ===
On May 23, 2024, President Joe Biden announced his intent to nominate Lanthier to serve as a United States district judge of the United States District Court for the District of Vermont. On June 4, 2024, her nomination was sent to the Senate. President Biden nominated Lanthier to the seat being vacated by Judge Geoffrey W. Crawford, who subsequently assumed senior status on August 9, 2024. On June 20, 2024, a hearing on her nomination was held before the Senate Judiciary Committee. On August 1, 2024, her nomination was reported out of committee by a 13–7 vote. On September 11, 2024, the United States Senate invoked cloture on her nomination by a 55–42 vote. Later that day, her nomination was confirmed by a 55–42 vote. She received her judicial commission on September 12, 2024. She was sworn in on September 17, 2024.

== Memberships ==
Since 2010, she has been a member of the National Association of Criminal Defense Lawyers.

Legal offices
Preceded by Geoffrey W. Crawford	Judge of the United States District Court for the District of Vermont; 2024–present	Incumbent
