= William K. Sessions III =

American judge (born 1947)

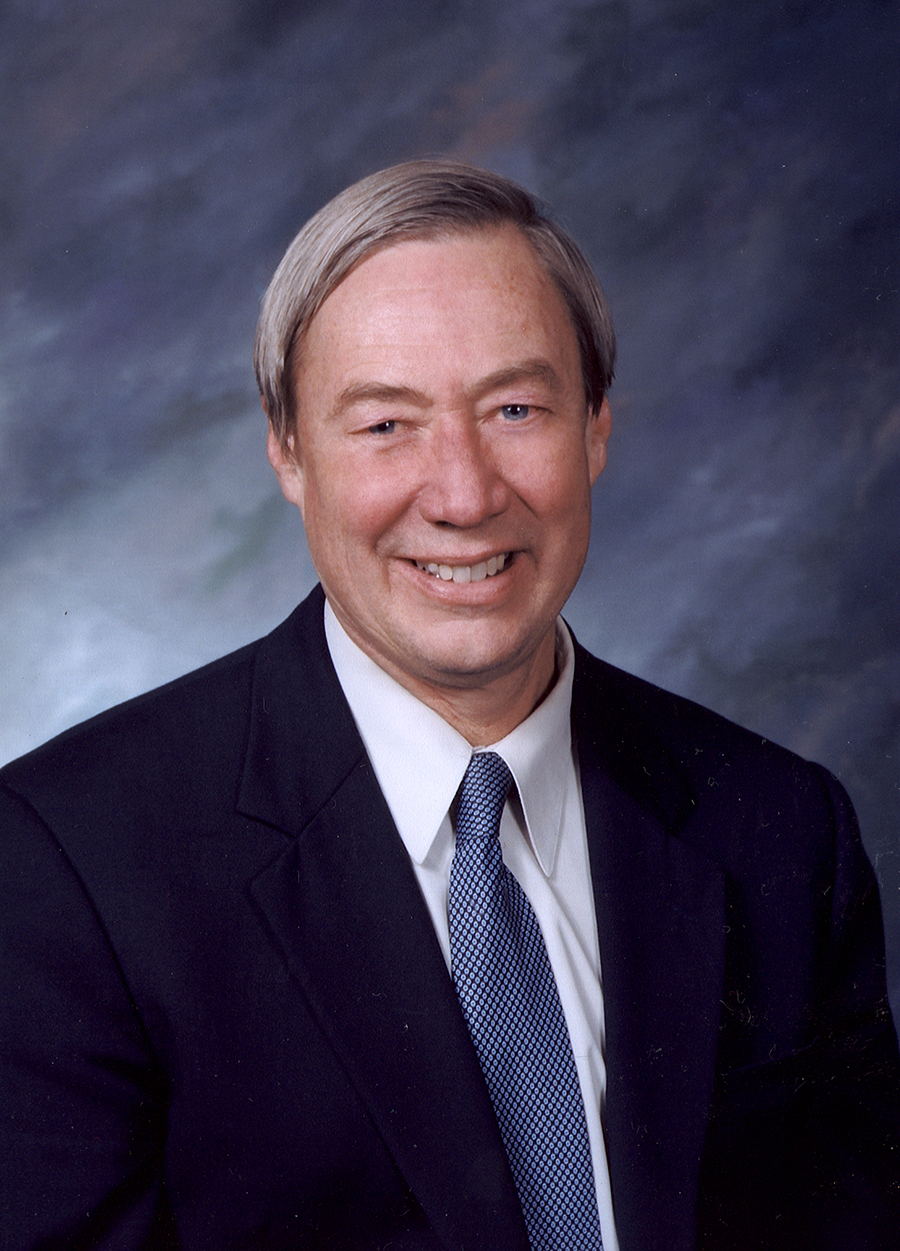

Senior Judge of the United States District Court for the District of Vermont
- Incumbent
- Assumed office June 15, 2014

Chair of the United States Sentencing Commission
- In office 2009–2010
- Appointed by: Barack Obama
- Preceded by: Michael E. Horowitz
- Succeeded by: Patti B. Saris

Chief Judge of the United States District Court for the District of Vermont
- In office 2002–2010
- Preceded by: John Garvan Murtha
- Succeeded by: Christina Reiss

Vice Chair of the Sentencing Commission
- In office 1999–2009
- Succeeded by: Charles Breyer

Judge of the United States District Court for the District of Vermont
- In office August 14, 1995 – June 15, 2014
- Appointed by: Bill Clinton
- Preceded by: Fred I. Parker
- Succeeded by: Geoffrey W. Crawford

Personal details
- Born: February 9, 1947 (age 79) Hartford, Connecticut, U.S.
- Education: Middlebury College (BA); George Washington University (JD)

William Kenneth Sessions III (born February 9, 1947) is serving as a senior United States district judge of the United States District Court for the District of Vermont and has served as the Vice Chair and eventually as Chair of the United States Sentencing Commission. He was confirmed on October 21, 2009, as Chair of the United States Sentencing Commission, and served until December 22, 2010.

== Education and career ==
Sessions was educated at Middlebury College where he earned a Bachelor of Arts degree in 1969. He earned a Juris Doctor in 1972 from the George Washington University Law School. Sessions served as a United States Army First Lieutenant. He was a law clerk for Judge Hilton Dier in Addison County District Court in 1973. He later worked for the Addison County Public Defender before entering private practice in 1978. He also worked as an adjunct professor at Vermont Law School from 1978 until 1995. In 1992 he managed the successful reelection campaign of Senator Patrick Leahy, who defeated Jim Douglas.

=== Federal judicial service ===
Sessions was nominated by President Bill Clinton on June 30, 1995, to a seat vacated by Judge Fred I. Parker. He was confirmed by the Senate on August 11, 1995, and received his commission on August 14, 1995. Sessions served as chief judge from 2002 to 2010. He assumed senior status on June 15, 2014.

=== Notable cases ===
On September 12, 2007, Judge Sessions ruled in favor of the Sierra Club, the states of Vermont and New York, and other environmental groups in rejecting the auto industry's attempt to block states from regulating emissions from cars. Sessions' ruling opens the doors for New York and Vermont to proceed with enacting the California Clean Car (Pavley) Standards, pending United States Environmental Protection Agency approval. These standards, adopted by California and at least 11 other states, aim to reduce emissions from cars by 30 percent when fully implemented in 2016. This precedent will likely have an important impact on similar cases pending in California and Rhode Island.

On May 9, 2025, Judge Sessions ruled that Rümeysa Öztürk, a foreign student of Tufts University who was detained by ICE for allegedly supporting Hamas to be released on bond. He said the government offered no evidence to keep her in detention and that her First Amendment and due process rights were violated, adding that her continued detention "potentially chills the speech of millions" of people.

=== U.S. Sentencing Commission ===
On April 20, 2009, President Barack Obama nominated Sessions to be Chair of the United States Sentencing Commission. Sessions' nomination languished with no full Senate vote for more than six months, with Senate Majority Leader Harry Reid contending that Senate Republicans had stalled Sessions' nomination in retaliation for the speed of Supreme Court Associate Justice Sonia Sotomayor's confirmation process. Reid filed cloture on Sessions' nomination on October 20, 2009, and the Senate confirmed Sessions in a voice vote on October 21, 2009.

Legal offices
Preceded by Fred I. Parker	Judge of the United States District Court for the District of Vermont; 1995–2014	Succeeded by Geoffrey W. Crawford
Unknown	Vice Chair of the United States Sentencing Commission; 1999–2009	Succeeded by Charles Breyer
Preceded by John Garvan Murtha	Chief Judge of the United States District Court for the District of Vermont; 2002–2010	Succeeded by Christina Reiss
Preceded by Michael E. Horowitz	Chair of the United States Sentencing Commission; 2009–2010	Succeeded by Patti B. Saris
