= Vermont Supreme Court =

Highest court in the U.S. state of Vermont

- Seal of the Vermont Supreme Court
- Interactive map of Vermont Supreme Court
- 44.26166°N 72.57975°W
- Established: 1782; 244 years ago
- Jurisdiction: Vermont
- Location: Montpelier
- Coordinates: 44.26166°N 72.57975°W
- Authorised by: Vermont Constitution
- Appeals to: Supreme Court of the United States
- Number of positions: 5
- Website: Official website

Chief Justice
- Currently: Paul L. Reiber
- Since: December 17, 2004

The Vermont Supreme Court is the highest judicial authority of the U.S. state of Vermont. Unlike most other states, the Vermont Supreme Court hears appeals directly from the trial courts, as Vermont has no intermediate appeals court.

The court consists of a chief justice and four associate justices; the court mostly hears appeals of cases that have been decided by other courts. The justices are appointed by the governor of Vermont with confirmation by the Vermont Senate. When a judicial vacancy occurs, the judicial nominating board submits to the governor the names of as many persons as it deems qualified for appointment. All justices come up for retention at the same time every six years. The next retention date is March 31, 2029. The Joint Committee on Judicial Retention reviews a justice's performance during the previous term and recommends to the Vermont General Assembly whether the justice should be retained. The committee consists of four House members appointed by the speaker of the House and four Senate members appointed by the Committee on Committees. After open debate and discussion, the General Assembly votes by secret ballot, with a majority having to vote against reappointment for a justice to be denied another term.

In addition to the retention process, any Vermont judge may be removed at any time in one of two ways: (1) judges may be impeached by a two-thirds vote of the General Assembly and convicted by a two-thirds vote of the Senate, and (2) a Judicial Conduct Board investigates complaints of judicial misconduct or disability and recommends any necessary action to the Supreme Court. Members of the Judiciary of Vermont must retire at the age of 90.

The current chief justice is Paul L. Reiber. Reiber was appointed as an associate justice in October 2003 by Jim Douglas and then sworn in as the chief justice of the court on December 17, 2004.

The Vermont Supreme Court has overall administrative control of the court system and makes administrative and procedural rules for all courts.

== Building ==
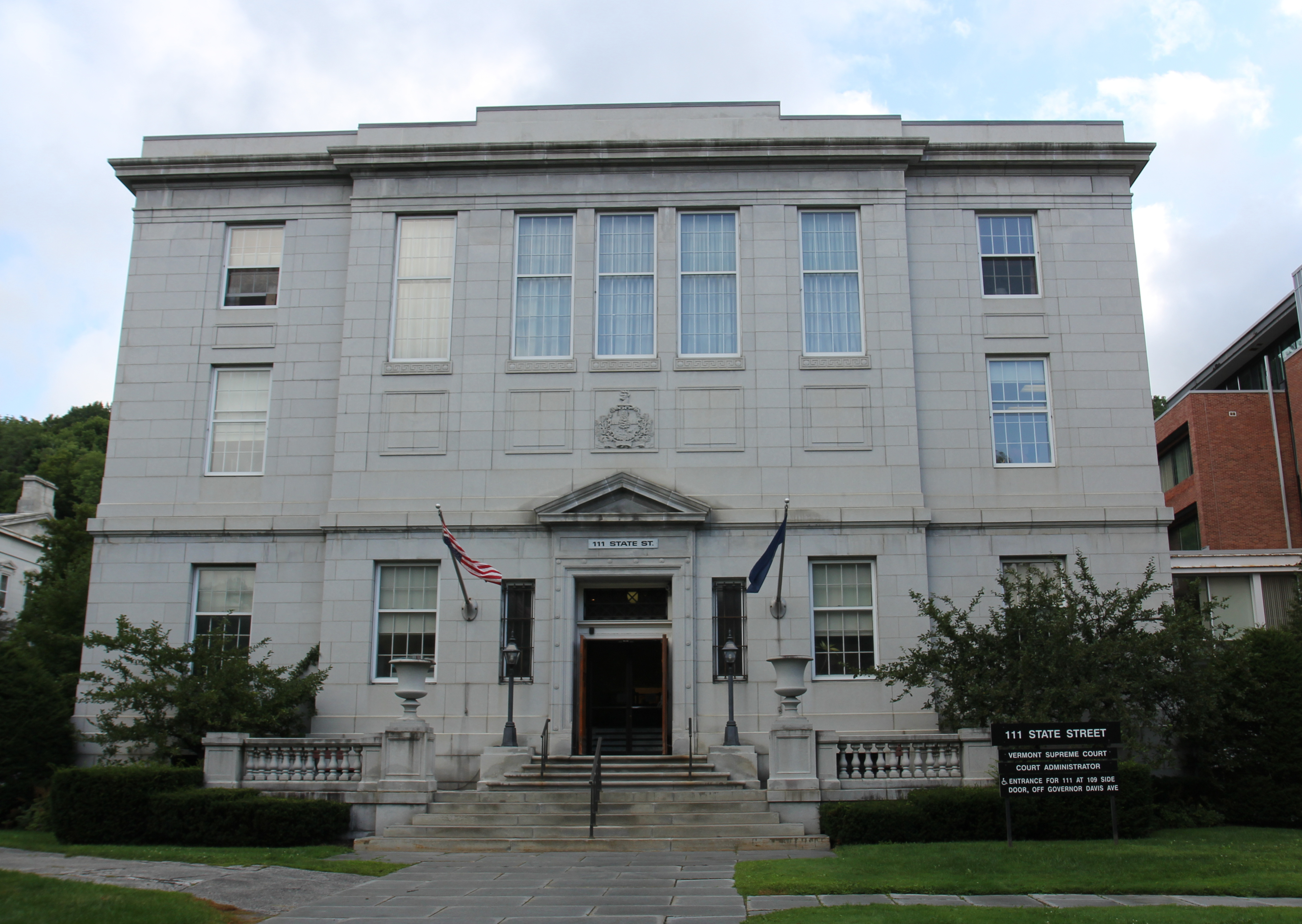
The Vermont Supreme Court's building in Montpelier.

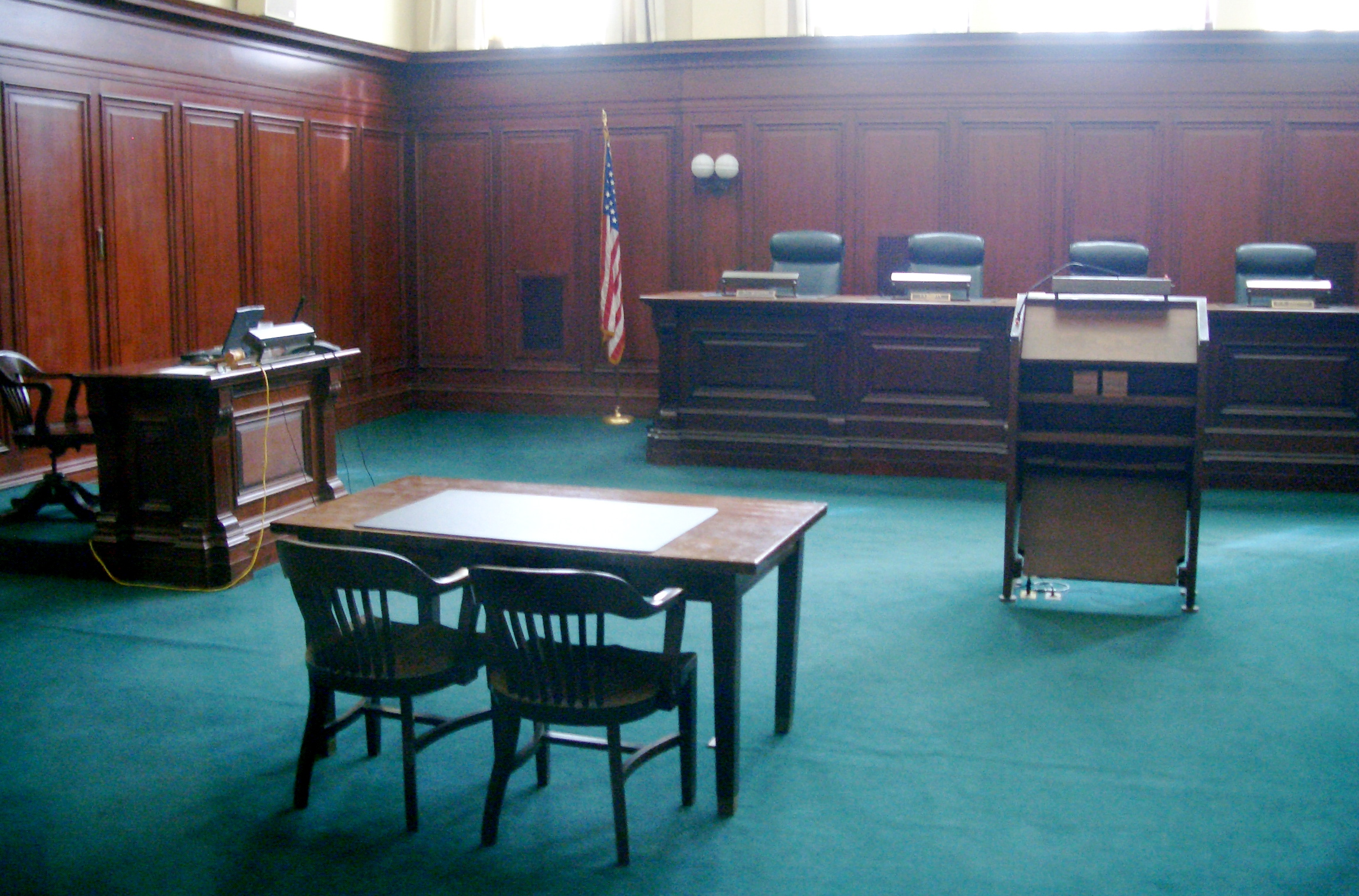
Interior of the courtroom

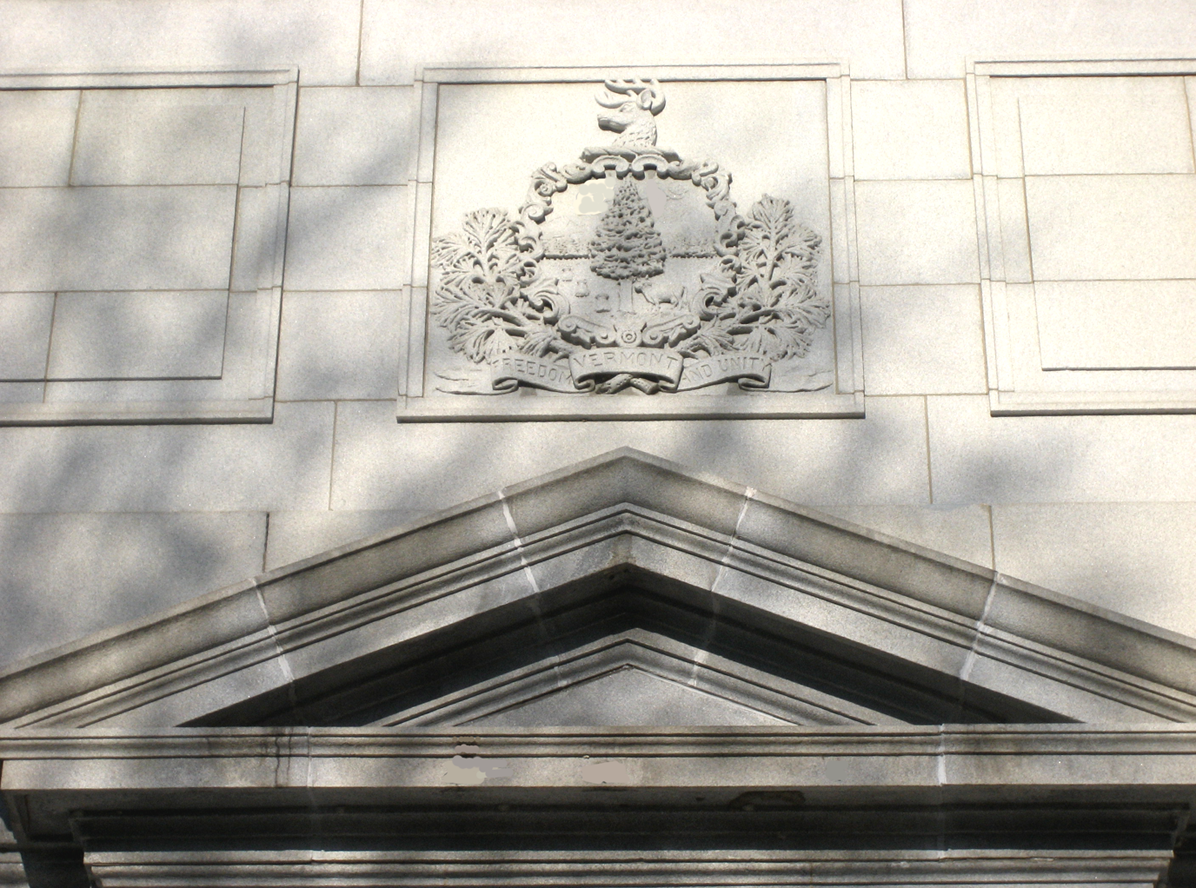
Detail of Vermont's coat of arms above the Court's main entrance.

The Vermont Supreme Court meets in a granite Beaux Arts-style building in Montpelier, just east of the Vermont State House and immediately west of The Pavilion Office Building.

The building site was the original site of the first Vermont State Building, a three-story wooden colonial Georgian structure, built in 1808 by Sylvanus Baldwin.

== Composition ==
Name	Born	Start	Term ends	Appointer	Law school
Paul Reiber, Chief Justice	June 20, 1947 (age 78)	October 2003 (Note: Became Chief Justice on December 17, 2004.)	2029	Jim Douglas (R)	Suffolk
Harold Eaton Jr.	August 25, 1955 (age 70)	October 27, 2014	2029	Peter Shumlin (D)	Vermont
Nancy Waples	October 7, 1960 (age 65)	April 15, 2022	2029	Phil Scott (R)	St. John's
Christina Nolan	September 26, 1979 (age 46)	February 3, 2026	2029	Phil Scott (R)	Boston College
Michael P. Drescher	1965 (age 60–61)	February 4, 2026	2029	Phil Scott (R)	Northwestern

== History ==
The original constitution called for a "Council of Censors" which provided oversight for the court and its membership. The Council was abolished in 1870.

Prominent individuals who have served as Chief Justice include Governor and United States Senator Moses Robinson; Senator Nathaniel Chipman; Governor and Senator Isaac Tichenor; Governor and Senator Jonathan Robinson; playwright Royall Tyler; Governor Richard Skinner; Senator Dudley Chase; Governor Cornelius P. Van Ness; Senator Samuel Prentiss; Governor Charles K. Williams; Governor Stephen Royce; Congressman Luke P. Poland; Congressman Homer Royce; Senator Jonathan Ross; and U.S. District Court Judge Franklin S. Billings Jr.

Olin M. Jeffords, the father of Senator James M. Jeffords, served as Chief Justice from 1955 to 1958.
