= Fred I. Parker =

American judge (1938–2003)

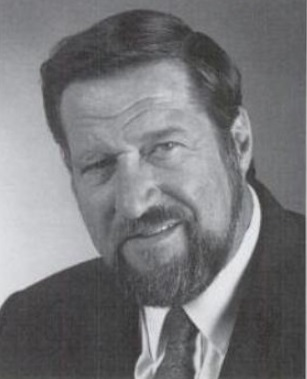

Judge of the United States Court of Appeals for the Second Circuit
- In office October 11, 1994 – August 12, 2003
- Appointed by: Bill Clinton
- Preceded by: James L. Oakes
- Succeeded by: Peter W. Hall

Chief Judge of the United States District Court for the District of Vermont
- In office 1991–1994
- Preceded by: Franklin S. Billings, Jr.
- Succeeded by: John Garvan Murtha

Judge of the United States District Court for the District of Vermont
- In office August 7, 1990 – October 11, 1994
- Appointed by: George H. W. Bush
- Preceded by: Albert Wheeler Coffrin
- Succeeded by: William K. Sessions III

Personal details
- Born: February 2, 1938 Boston, Massachusetts, U.S.
- Died: August 12, 2003 (aged 65) Burlington, Vermont, U.S.
- Education: University of Massachusetts Amherst (BA); Georgetown University Law Center (JD)

Fred Irving Parker (February 2, 1938 – August 12, 2003) was a United States circuit judge of the United States Court of Appeals for the Second Circuit and a United States district judge of the United States District Court for the District of Vermont.

== Education and career ==
Parker was born in Boston, Massachusetts. He received a Bachelor of Arts degree from the University of Massachusetts in 1962. He received a Juris Doctor from Georgetown University Law Center in 1965. He was in the United States Marine Corps Reserve from 1955 to 1962. He was in private practice of law in Boston from 1965 to 1966. He was in private practice of law in Burlington, Vermont from 1966 to 1969. He was a deputy state attorney general of Vermont from 1969 to 1972. He was in private practice of law in Middlebury, Vermont from 1972 to 1982. He was in private practice of law in Burlington from 1982 to 1990. As of 2020, Parker is the last judge appointed to the District of Vermont by a Republican president.

== Federal judicial service ==
Parker was nominated by President George H. W. Bush on June 21, 1990, to a seat on the United States District Court for the District of Vermont vacated by Judge Albert W. Coffrin. He was confirmed by the United States Senate on August 3, 1990, and received commission on August 7, 1990. He served as Chief Judge from 1991 to 1994. His service was terminated on October 11, 1994, due to elevation to the court of appeals.

Parker was a federal judge on the United States Court of Appeals for the Second Circuit. Parker was nominated by President Bill Clinton on August 25, 1994, to a seat on the United States Court of Appeals for the Second Circuit vacated by James L. Oakes. He was confirmed by the Senate on October 7, 1994, and received commission on October 11, 1994. His service was terminated on August 12, 2003, due to death. While on the bench, his law clerks included Eric Miller, who later served as US Attorney for Vermont.

== Death ==
Parker died on August 12, 2003, in Burlington. The Associated Press reported at that time that Parker had been undergoing a procedure to adjust a pacemaker.

== Sources ==
Legal offices
Preceded by Albert Wheeler Coffrin	Judge of the United States District Court for the District of Vermont; 1990–1994	Succeeded by William K. Sessions III
Preceded by Franklin S. Billings Jr.	Chief Judge of the United States District Court for the District of Vermont; 1991–1994	Succeeded by John Garvan Murtha
Preceded by James L. Oakes	Judge of the United States Court of Appeals for the Second Circuit; 1994–2003	Succeeded by Peter W. Hall
