= United States District Court for the District of Vermont =

United States federal district court of Vermont

Coordinates: 44.480727°N 73.214117°W

- (D. Vt.)
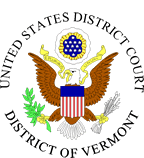

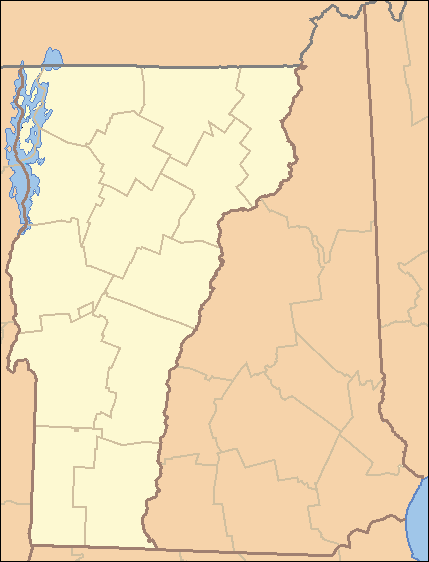
- Location: Burlington More locations: Rutland
- Appeals to: Second Circuit
- Established: March 2, 1791
- Judges: 2
- Chief Judge: Christina Reiss

Officers of the court
- U.S. Attorney: Jonathan A. Ophardt (acting)
- U.S. Marshal: John Hall (acting)
- www.vtd.uscourts.gov

The United States District Court for the District of Vermont (in case citations, D. Vt.) is the federal district court whose jurisdiction is the federal district of Vermont. The court has locations in Brattleboro, Burlington, and Rutland. The court was created by a March 2, 1791 amendment (1 Stat. 197) to the Judiciary Act of 1789 and assigned to the eastern circuit. Under the Midnight Judges Act, the Circuits were reorganized and this court was assigned to the United States Court of Appeals for the Second Circuit where it has remained since. Originally created with one judgeship, in 1966 a second judgeship was added.

Appeals from the District of Vermont are taken to the United States Court of Appeals for the Second Circuit (except for patent claims and claims against the U.S. government under the Tucker Act, which are appealed to the Federal Circuit).

The United States Attorney's Office for the District of Vermont represents the United States in civil and criminal litigation in the court. As of January 13, 2026 the acting United States attorney is Jonathan A. Ophardt.

== Current judges ==
As of September 12, 2024:

#	Title	Judge	Duty station	Born	Term of service			Appointed by
#	Title	Judge	Duty station	Born	Active	Chief	Senior	Appointed by
19	Chief Judge	Christina Reiss	Burlington	1962	2009–present	2010–2017; 2024–present	—	Obama
21	District Judge	Mary Kay Lanthier	Rutland	1971	2024–present	—	—	Biden
17	Senior Judge	John Garvan Murtha	inactive	1941	1995–2009	1995–2002	2009–present	Clinton
18	Senior Judge	William K. Sessions III	Burlington	1947	1995–2014	2002–2010	2014–present	Clinton
20	Senior Judge	Geoffrey W. Crawford	Burlington	1954	2014–2024	2017–2024	2024–present	Obama

== Former judges ==
#	Judge	Born–died	Active service	Chief Judge	Senior status	Appointed by	Reason for termination
1	Nathaniel Chipman	1752–1843	1791–1793	—	—	Washington	resignation
2	Samuel Hitchcock	1755–1813	1793–1801 (Note: Recess appointment; formally nominated on December 27, 1793, confirmed by the United States Senate on December 30, 1793, and received commission on January 28, 1794)	—	—	Washington	elevation
3	Elijah Paine	1757–1842	1801–1842	—	—	J. Adams	resignation
4	Samuel Prentiss	1782–1857	1842–1857	—	—	Tyler	death
5	David Allen Smalley	1809–1877	1857–1877	—	—	Pierce	death
6	Hoyt Henry Wheeler	1833–1906	1877–1906	—	—	Hayes	retirement
7	James Loren Martin	1846–1915	1906–1915 (Note: Recess appointment; formally nominated on December 3, 1906, confirmed by the Senate on December 11, 1906, and received commission the same day)	—	—	T. Roosevelt	death
8	Harland Bradley Howe	1873–1946	1915–1940	—	1940–1945	Wilson	retirement
9	James Patrick Leamy	1892–1949	1940–1949	—	—	F. Roosevelt	death
10	Ernest W. Gibson Jr.	1901–1969	1949–1969	1966–1969	—	Truman	death
11	Bernard Joseph Leddy	1910–1972	1966–1972	1969–1972	—	L. Johnson	death
12	James L. Oakes	1924–2007	1970–1971	—	—	Nixon	elevation
13	James Stuart Holden	1914–1996	1971–1984	1972–1983	1984–1996	Nixon	death
14	Albert Wheeler Coffrin	1919–1993	1972–1989	1983–1988	1989–1993	Nixon	death
15	Franklin S. Billings Jr.	1922–2014	1984–1994	1988–1991	1994–2014	Reagan	death
16	Fred I. Parker	1938–2003	1990–1994	1991–1994	—	G.H.W. Bush	elevation

== Chief judges ==
Chief Judge
Gibson	1966–1969
Leddy	1969–1972
Holden	1972–1983
Coffrin	1983–1988
Billings	1988–1991
Parker	1991–1994
Murtha	1995–2002
Sessions	2002–2010
Reiss	2010–2017
Crawford	2017–2024
Reiss	2024–present

Chief judges have administrative responsibilities with respect to their district court. Unlike the Supreme Court, where one justice is specifically nominated to be chief, the office of chief judge rotates among the district court judges. To be chief, a judge must have been in active service on the court for at least one year, be under the age of 65, and have not previously served as chief judge.

A vacancy is filled by the judge highest in seniority among the group of qualified judges. The chief judge serves for a term of seven years, or until age 70, whichever occurs first. The age restrictions are waived if no members of the court would otherwise be qualified for the position.

When the office was created in 1948, the chief judge was the longest-serving judge who had not elected to retire, on what has since 1958 been known as senior status, or declined to serve as chief judge. After August 6, 1959, judges could not become or remain chief after turning 70 years old. The current rules have been in operation since October 1, 1982.

== Succession of seats ==
Seat 1
Seat established on March 2, 1791 by 1 Stat. 197
Chipman	1791–1793
Hitchcock	1793–1801
Paine	1801–1842
Prentiss	1842–1857
Smalley	1857–1877
Wheeler	1877–1906
Martin	1906–1915
Howe	1915–1940
Leamy	1940–1949
Gibson Jr.	1950–1969
Oakes	1970–1971
Holden	1971–1984
Billings Jr.	1984–1994
Murtha	1995–2009
Reiss	2009–present

Seat 2
Seat established on March 18, 1966 by 80 Stat. 75
Leddy	1966–1972
Coffrin	1972–1989
Parker	1990–1994
Sessions III	1995–2014
Crawford	2014–2024
Lanthier	2024–present

== U.S. attorneys ==
U.S. attorneys for Vermont since it attained statehood in 1791 include:

U.S. Attorney	Term started	Term ended	Presidents served under
Stephen Jacob	1791	1794	George Washington
Amos Marsh	1794	1796	George Washington
Charles Marsh	1797	1801	John Adams
David Fay	1801	1809	Thomas Jefferson
Cornelius P. Van Ness	1810	1813	James Madison
Titus Hutchinson	1813	1821	James Madison, James Monroe
William A. Griswold	1821	1829	James Monroe, and John Quincy Adams
Daniel Kellogg	1829	1841	Andrew Jackson, Martin Van Buren, and William Henry Harrison
Charles Davis	1841	1845	John Tyler
Charles Linsley	1845	1849	James K. Polk
Abel Underwood	1849	1853	Zachary Taylor and Millard Fillmore
Lucius B. Peck	1853	1857	Franklin Pierce
Henry E. Stoughton	1857	1860	James Buchanan
George Howe	1861	1864	Abraham Lincoln
Dudley C. Denison	1864	1869	Abraham Lincoln and Andrew Johnson
Benjamin F. Fifield	1869	1880	Ulysses S. Grant and Rutherford B. Hayes
Kittredge Haskins	1880	1887	Rutherford B. Hayes, James Garfield, Chester A. Arthur, and Grover Cleveland
Clarence H. Pitkin	1887	1889	Grover Cleveland
Frank Plumley	1889	1894	Benjamin Harrison and Grover Cleveland
John H. Senter	1894	1898	Grover Cleveland and William McKinley
James L. Martin	1898	1906	William McKinley, and Theodore Roosevelt
Alexander Dunnett	1906	1915	Theodore Roosevelt, William Howard Taft, and Woodrow Wilson
Vernon A. Bullard	1915	1923	Woodrow Wilson and Warren Harding
Harry B. Amey	1923	1933	Calvin Coolidge and Herbert Hoover
Joseph A. McNamara	1933	1953	Franklin D. Roosevelt and Harry Truman
Louis G. Whitcomb	1953	1961	Dwight D. Eisenhower
Joseph F. Radigan	1961	1969	John F. Kennedy and Lyndon B. Johnson
George Cook	1969	1977	Richard Nixon and Gerald Ford
William B. Gray	1977	1981	Jimmy Carter
Jerome O'Neill	1981	1981	Jimmy Carter and Ronald Reagan
George Cook	1981	1987	Ronald Reagan
George J. Terwilliger III	1987	1991	Ronald Reagan and George H. W. Bush
Charles Caruso	1991	1993	George H. W. Bush and Bill Clinton
Charles Tetzlaff	1993	2001	Bill Clinton and George W. Bush
Peter Hall	2001	2004	George W. Bush
David Kirby	2005	2006	George W. Bush
Tom Anderson	2006	2009	George W. Bush
Tristram J. Coffin	2009	2015	Barack Obama
Eric Miller	2015	2017	Barack Obama and Donald Trump
Christina Nolan	2017	2021	Donald Trump
Nikolas P. Kerest	2021	2025	Joe Biden
Michael P. Drescher (acting)	2025	2026	Donald Trump
Jonathan A. Ophardt (acting)	2026	present	Donald Trump

== U.S. marshals ==
=== Duties and responsibilities ===
The United States Marshal for the District of Vermont oversees all Marshals Service operations in Vermont. The Vermont district maintains offices in Burlington and Rutland, enabling the Marshals Service to carry out its role with respect to public safety in Vermont. The U.S. Marshal for Vermont is responsible for federal law enforcement activities within the state, including apprehending fugitives and sex offenders, managing transport of federal prisoners, and protecting federal courthouses.

=== History ===
The offices of U.S. Marshal and Deputy Marshal were created by the 1st U.S. Congress when it passed the Judiciary Act of 1789. Marshals were presidential appointees and their duties included supporting the federal courts within their districts and executing the orders of the president, Congress and federal judges. Support of the courts included serving subpoenas, summonses, writs, and warrants, making arrests, and handling prisoners. Marshals were also responsible for the finances and administration of the courts, including paying fees, expenses, and salaries for court clerks, U.S. Attorneys, jurors, and witnesses. Marshals serve at the pleasure of the president, and when the positions were created, Congress created a time limit on Marshals' service. Marshals are limited to four-year, renewable terms that expire unless they are reappointed.

In the country's early years, Marshals rented courtroom and jail space, and hired and supervised bailiffs, criers, and janitors. They also handled the day-to-day activities of court proceedings, including ensuring that defendants were present, jurors were available, and witnesses appeared as required. Marshals were also called upon to carry out federal death sentences and investigate counterfeiting. Because they were paid on a fee system, the positions were lucrative and highly sought after.

Marshals also filled a gap in the federal government as it was originally designed, executing numerous tasks because no other agency was available to do them. These duties included taking the national census every 10 years until 1870, distributing Presidential proclamations, collecting statistical data for use by federal agencies, and supplying data on federal employees for including in a national register, deporting foreigners who entered the country illegally, and capturing fugitive slaves.

Over time, the duties of Marshals grew to include activities such as enforcement of the Eighteenth Amendment, the prohibition of the sale and transport of alcoholic beverages. In the modern era, the duties and responsibilities of U.S. Marshals include witness protection and apprehension of federal fugitives.

=== U.S. marshals and dates of appointment ===
Vermont's U.S. marshals have included:

- Lewis R. Morris, March 4, 1791
- Jabez G. Fitch, June 9, 1794
- John Willard, March 11, 1801
- David Robinson, January 7, 1811
- Heman Allen (of Colchester), December 14, 1818
- Joseph Edson, March 3, 1823
- Heman Lowry, June 6, 1829
- George W. Barker, December 30, 1835
- Heman Lowry, March 7, 1837
- William Barron, March 10, 1841
- Jacob Kent Jr., March 15, 1845
- John Pettes, March 13, 1849
- Charles Chapin, April 1, 1853
- Lewis S. Partridge, May 2, 1857
- Charles C. P. Baldwin, April 12, 1861
- Hugh H. Henry, July 25, 1865
- George P. Foster, January 24, 1870
- William W. Henry, April 10, 1879
- John Robinson, June 24, 1886
- Rollin Amsden, June 18, 1890
- Emory S. Harris, June 9, 1894
- Fred A. Field, June 14, 1898
- Frank H. Chapman, October 16, 1903
- Horace W. Bailey, October 21, 1903
- Arthur P. Carpenter, February 14, 1914
- Albert W. Harvey, June 2, 1922
- Edward L. Burke, June 7, 1935
- Dewey H. Perry, March 14, 1954
- Thomas W. Sorrell, August 3, 1961
- Christian Hansen Jr., June 20, 1969
- Earle B. McLaughlin, July 28, 1977
- Christian Hansen Jr., March 17, 1982
- John E. Rouille, September 29, 1994
- John H. Sinclair, November 29, 1999
- John R. Edwards, March 18, 2002
- David E. Demag, August 18, 2009
- Bradley J. LaRose, January 2, 2019
- John Hall (acting), July 9, 2024

== See also ==
- Courts of Vermont
- List of current United States district judges
- List of United States federal courthouses in Vermont
