= Albert Wheeler Coffrin =

American judge (1919–1993)

Albert W. Coffrin
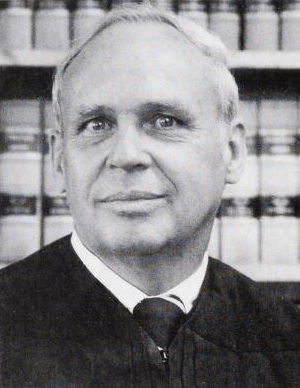
- Friom the Spring 1993 edition of Middlebury College Magazine

Senior Judge of the United States District Court for the District of Vermont
- In office January 31, 1989 – January 13, 1993

Chief Judge of the United States District Court for the District of Vermont
- In office 1983–1988
- Preceded by: James Stuart Holden
- Succeeded by: Franklin S. Billings Jr.

Judge of the United States District Court for the District of Vermont
- In office June 9, 1972 – January 31, 1989
- Appointed by: Richard Nixon
- Preceded by: Bernard Joseph Leddy
- Succeeded by: Fred I. Parker

Personal details
- Born: Albert Wheeler Coffrin; December 21, 1919 Burlington, Vermont, US
- Died: January 13, 1993 (aged 73) Burlington, Vermont, US
- Education: Middlebury College (A.B.); Cornell Law School (LL.B.)

Albert Wheeler Coffrin (December 21, 1919 – January 13, 1993) was a United States district judge of the United States District Court for the District of Vermont.

== Education and career ==
Born in Burlington, Vermont, Coffrin received an Artium Baccalaureus degree from Middlebury College in 1941 and was a lieutenant in the United States Navy during World War II, from 1942 to 1945. He received a Bachelor of Laws from Cornell Law School in 1947, entering private practice in Burlington from 1947 to 1951. He again served in the Navy during the Korean War, from 1951 to 1952, thereafter returning to private practice in Burlington until 1972.

== Federal judicial service ==
On May 3, 1972, Coffrin was nominated by President Richard Nixon to a seat on the United States District Court for the District of Vermont vacated by Judge Bernard Joseph Leddy. Coffrin was confirmed by the United States Senate on June 8, 1972, and received his commission the next day. He served as Chief Judge from 1983 to 1988, assuming senior status on January 31, 1989, and serving in that capacity until his death on January 13, 1993, in Burlington. He was buried at Burlington's Lakeview Cemetery.

Legal offices
Preceded by Bernard Joseph Leddy	Judge of the United States District Court for the District of Vermont; 1972–1989	Succeeded by Fred I. Parker
Preceded by James Stuart Holden	Chief Judge of the United States District Court for the District of Vermont; 1983–1988	Succeeded by Franklin S. Billings Jr.
