= Dean Covered Bridge =

- U.S. National Register of Historic Places
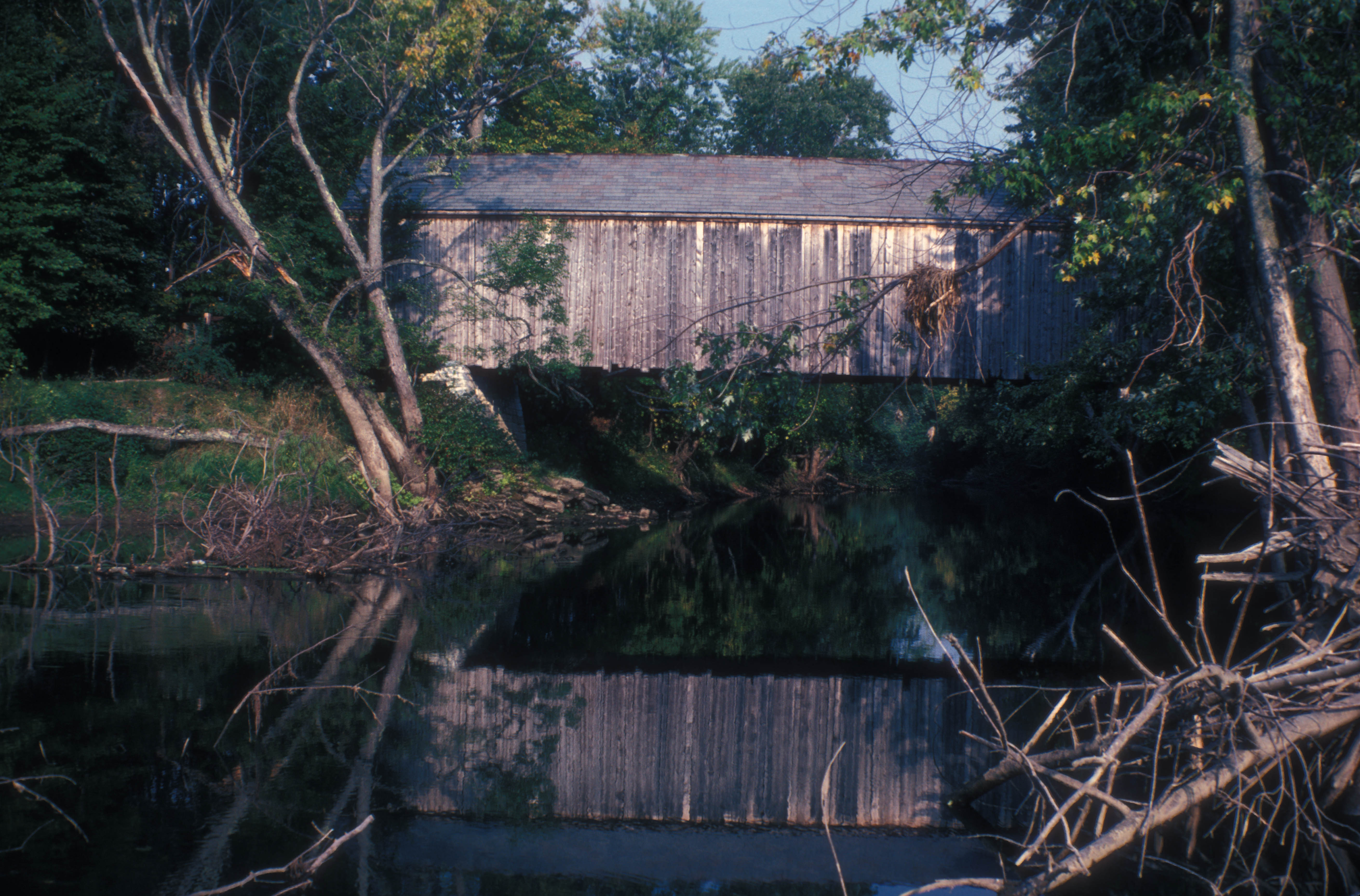
- 1970 photo

- Location within Vermont Location within the United States
- Nearest city: Brandon, Vermont
- Coordinates: 43°46′43″N 73°5′51″W
- Area: 1 acre (0.40 ha)
- Built: 1840
- Architectural style: Town lattice truss
- NRHP reference No.: 74000252
- Added to NRHP: September 10, 1974

The Dean Covered Bridge was a Town lattice truss covered bridge, carrying Union Street across Otter Creek in Brandon, Vermont. Built in 1840, it was one of Vermont's oldest covered bridges at the time of its destruction in 1986 by an arsonist. It was listed on the National Register of Historic Places, and was replaced by a modern steel and concrete bridge.

== Description and history ==
The Dean Covered Bridge was located about 1 mile (1.6 km) south of the center of Brandon Village. Union Street is a local road, providing access from the village to the rural southwestern part of the town, and crosses Otter Brook on a roughly northeast-southwest alignment. The bridge was a single-span Town lattice truss structure with an overall length of 132 feet (40 m) and a truss length of 121 feet (37 m). It was 21.5 feet (6.6 m) wide, with a roadway width of 18 feet (5.5 m). Laminated stringers had been tied to its underside to add strength, as were iron sway braces. The exterior of the bridge was finished in flush vertical board siding, and it had a gabled slate roof.

The bridge was built about 1838, and was (along with the Sanderson Covered Bridge) one of two surviving 19th-century covered bridges in Brandon at the time of its listing on the National Register in 1974. The bridge was destroyed by an arsonist in 1986, and has been replaced by a modern steel and concrete bridge.

== See also ==
- National Register of Historic Places listings in Rutland County, Vermont
- List of Vermont covered bridges
- List of bridges on the National Register of Historic Places in Vermont
