= List of Improved Order of Red Men members =

North American fraternal members

The Improved Order of Red Men is a fraternal organization established in North America in 1834. The following is a list of some of the notable members of the Red Men.

== Business ==
- Charles F. Burgman – labor unionist
- George Snook – businessman
- Huston Wyeth – industrialist and businessman

== Government ==
- John Robinson – United States Marshal
- James Farley – United States Postmaster General, New York Assembly

== Law ==
- William H. Atwell – judge of the United States District Court for the Northern District of Texas
- John Boyd Avis – New Jersey Senate; judge of the United States District Court for the District of New Jersey
- J. Sidney Bernstein – New York Supreme Court justice, New York State Assembly
- Lloyd Llewellyn Black – judge of the United States District Court for the Eastern District of Washington
- John M. Daniel – Attorney General of South Carolina, South Carolina House of Representatives
- Paul Farthing – chief justice of the Supreme Court of Illinois
- Clarke C. Fitts – Vermont Attorney General and Vermont House of Representatives
- David Ezekiel Henderson – judge of the United States District Court for the Western District of North Carolina
- Lafayette F. Mosher – Justice of the Oregon Supreme Court
- George W. Ray – judge of the United States District Court for the Northern District of New York; United States House of Representatives
- Ray B. Smith – lawyer and politician
- Robert E. Woodside – justice of the Pennsylvania Superior Court; Pennsylvania House of Representatives
- Albert Dutton MacDade – Pennsylvania State Senate, judge of the Pennsylvania Court of Common Pleas, and district attorney of Delaware County

== Military ==
- James R. Hogg – United States Navy four star admiral
- John Davis Long – United States Secretary of the Navy, Governor of Massachusetts, United States House of Representatives, Lieutenant Governor of Massachusetts, Massachusetts House of Representatives

== Politics ==
=== Vice President ===
- Alben W. Barkley – Vice President of the United States, United States Senate, United States House of Representatives

=== U.S. Senate ===
- Thomas G. Burch – United States Senate and United States House of Representatives
- Clarence Dill – United States Senator and United States House of Representatives
- Ernest W. Gibson – United States Senate and United States House of Representatives
- Luke Lea – United States Senator and publisher of The Tennessean
- Morris Sheppard – United States Senate and United States House of Representatives
- Samuel M. Shortridge – United States Senate
- Morris Sheppard – United States Senate and United States House of Representatives

=== U.S. House of Representatives ===
- Charles Laban Abernethy – United States House of Representatives
- Charles Marley Anderson – United States House of Representatives
- Glenn M. Anderson – Lieutenant Governor of California, United States House of Representatives
- Sol Bloom – United States House of Representatives; entertainment impresario, sheet music publisher
- John J. Boylan – United States House of Representatives, New York State Senate, New York State Assembly
- Charles H. Brand – United States House of Representatives
- Joseph R. Bryson – United States House of Representatives, South Carolina Senate, South Carolina House of Representatives
- Jo Byrns – Speaker of the United States House of Representatives, Tennessee House of Representatives
- Goodloe Byron – United States House of Representatives, Maryland Senate, Maryland House of Delegates
- William P. Connery Jr. – United States House of Representatives
- S. Hubert Dent Jr. – United States House of Representatives
- Frederick H. Dominick – United States House of Representatives, South Carolina House of Representatives
- Harry L. Englebright – United States House of Representatives
- Finly Hutchinson Gray – United States House of Representatives
- Harry L. Haines – United States House of Representatives
- Pehr G. Holmes – United States House of Representatives
- George Huddleston – United States House of Representatives
- Edward A. Kenney – United States House of Representatives
- William Larrabee – United States House of Representatives
- Clarence F. Lea – United States House of Representatives
- Robert Leggett – United States House of Representatives
- Bert Lord – United States House of Representatives, New York Senate, New York State Assembly
- Henry C. Loudenslager – United States House of Representatives
- John McDuffie – United States House of Representatives, Alabama House of Representatives, judge of the United States District Court for the Southern District of Alabama
- Charles D. Millard – United States House of Representatives
- Will E. Neal – United States House of Representatives
- Samuel J. Nicholls – United States House of Representatives, South Carolina House of Representatives
- Choice B. Randell – United States House of Representatives
- Eugene E. Reed – United States House of Representatives
- John Buchanan Robinson – United States House of Representatives, Pennsylvania State Senate, and Pennsylvania House of Representatives
- J. Edward Russell – United States House of Representatives and Ohio Senate
- Henry E. Stubbs – United States House of Representatives
- Malcolm C. Tarver – United States House of Representatives
- Benjamin I. Taylor – United States House of Representatives
- J. Alfred Taylor – United States House of Representatives and Speaker of the West Virginia House of Delegates
- Clark W. Thompson – United States House of Representatives
- Ralph E. Updike – United States House of Representatives
- Elmer H. Wene – United States House of Representatives, New Jersey Senate
- John Stephens Wood – United States House of Representatives

=== Governors ===
- Raymond E. Baldwin – Governor of Connecticut, United States Senator, associate justice of the Connecticut Supreme Court of Errors
- Cole L. Blease – Governor of South Carolina, United States Senator, President Pro Tempore of the South Carolina Senate
- R. Gregg Cherry – Governor of North Carolina, North Carolina Senate, Speaker of the North Carolina House of Representatives
- William G. Conley – Governor of West Virginia, Attorney General of West Virginia
- Louis Lincoln Emmerson – Governor of Illinois
- Levi K. Fuller – Governor of Vermont, Lieutenant Governor of Vermont, Vermont Senate
- Louis F. Hart – Governor of Washington
- Marcus H. Holcomb – Governor of Connecticut, Attorney General of Connecticut, Connecticut Senate
- Olin D. Johnston – Governor of South Carolina, United States Senate, South Carolina House of Representatives
- John G. Townsend Jr. – Governor of Delaware, United States Senate, Delaware House of Representatives
- John H. Trumbull – Governor of Connecticut, Lieutenant Governor of Connecticut, and Connecticut Senate
- William M. Tuck – Governor of Virginia, United States House of Representatives, Lieutenant Governor of Virginia, Virginia Senate

=== Lt. Governor ===
- Alexander P. Riddle – Lieutenant Governor of Kansas

=== State legislature ===
- Albert E. Anderson – Maine House of Representatives
- Martin B. Bailey – Illinois Senate and Illinois House of Representatives
- Richard J. Baldwin – Speaker of the Pennsylvania House of Representatives; Pennsylvania State Senate
- George C. Brownell – President of the Oregon State Senate, Oregon House of Representatives
- Joseph H. Brownell – New York State Assembly
- Charles S. Butler – New York State Assembly
- Hampton J. Cheney – Tennessee Senate
- Abraham Curry – Nevada Territorial Legislature; founder of Carson City, Nevada
- Thomas C. Desmond – New York Senate; president and chief engineer of the Newburgh Ship Yards
- Owen J. Dever – New York State Assembly
- Martin W. Deyo – New York Senate, New York State Assembly
- James Augustus Fox – Massachusetts House of Representatives, Massachusetts Senate
- William J. Grattan – New York State Senate, New York State Assembly
- Abraham Greenberg – New York State Senate, New York State Assembly
- Arthur C. Greene – Iowa House of Representatives
- Robert B. Groat – New Jersey Senate and newspaper publisher
- John W. Haigis – editor and publisher of the Greenfield Recorder, Massachusetts Senate, Massachusetts House of Representatives
- Emory S. Harris – Vermont House of Representatives
- Conrad Hasenflug – New York State Senate
- Joseph T. Higgins – New York State Assembly
- Epenetus Howe – New York State Assembly
- Samuel A. Jones – New York State Assembly, New York State Senate
- Rufus King Jordan – Maine House of Representatives
- Frederick W. Kavanaugh – New York State Senate
- Anson F. Keeler – Connecticut Senate and Connecticut State Comptroller
- Edgar C. Levey – Speaker of the California State Assembly
- Charles E. Loizeaux – New Jersey Senate
- James Male – New York State Assembly
- Thomas A. McWhinney – New York State Assembly
- Edward E. Moore – Indiana Senate and Los Angeles City Council
- William Newcorn – New Jersey General Assembly
- George H. Newhall – Massachusetts House of Representatives, Mayor of Lynn, Massachusetts
- Olin T. Nye – New York State Assembly
- Duncan T. O'Brien – New York State Senate
- Roy M. Page – New York State Senate
- Thomas Pearce – Maryland House of Delegates
- A. J. Rosier – Wyoming Senate
- Arthur J. Ruland – New York State Assembly
- Nelson Ruttenberg – New York State Assembly
- Vincent Thomas – California State Assembly
- Charles F. Tupper – New York State Assembly
- John Van Schaick – New York State Senate
- Julius Volker – New York State Assembly
- William W. Wemple – New York State Assembly
- Forman E. Whitcomb – New York State Assembly

=== State other ===
- Walter D. Guilbert – Ohio State Auditor
- Andrew Russel – Treasurer of Illinois
- Henry Wulff – Treasurer of Illinois

=== Local ===
- James L. Key – Mayor of Atlanta
- William Lamb – Mayor of Norfolk, Virginia; newspaperman, and Confederate States Army officer
- George Sidney Marshall – Mayor of Columbus

== Sports ==
- Kirtley Baker – professional baseball player with the Baltimore Orioles, Pittsburgh Alleghenys, and Washington Senators
- Harry Arista Mackey – college footaball player and coach; mayor of Philadelphia
