= Sanderson Covered Bridge =

- U.S. National Register of Historic Places
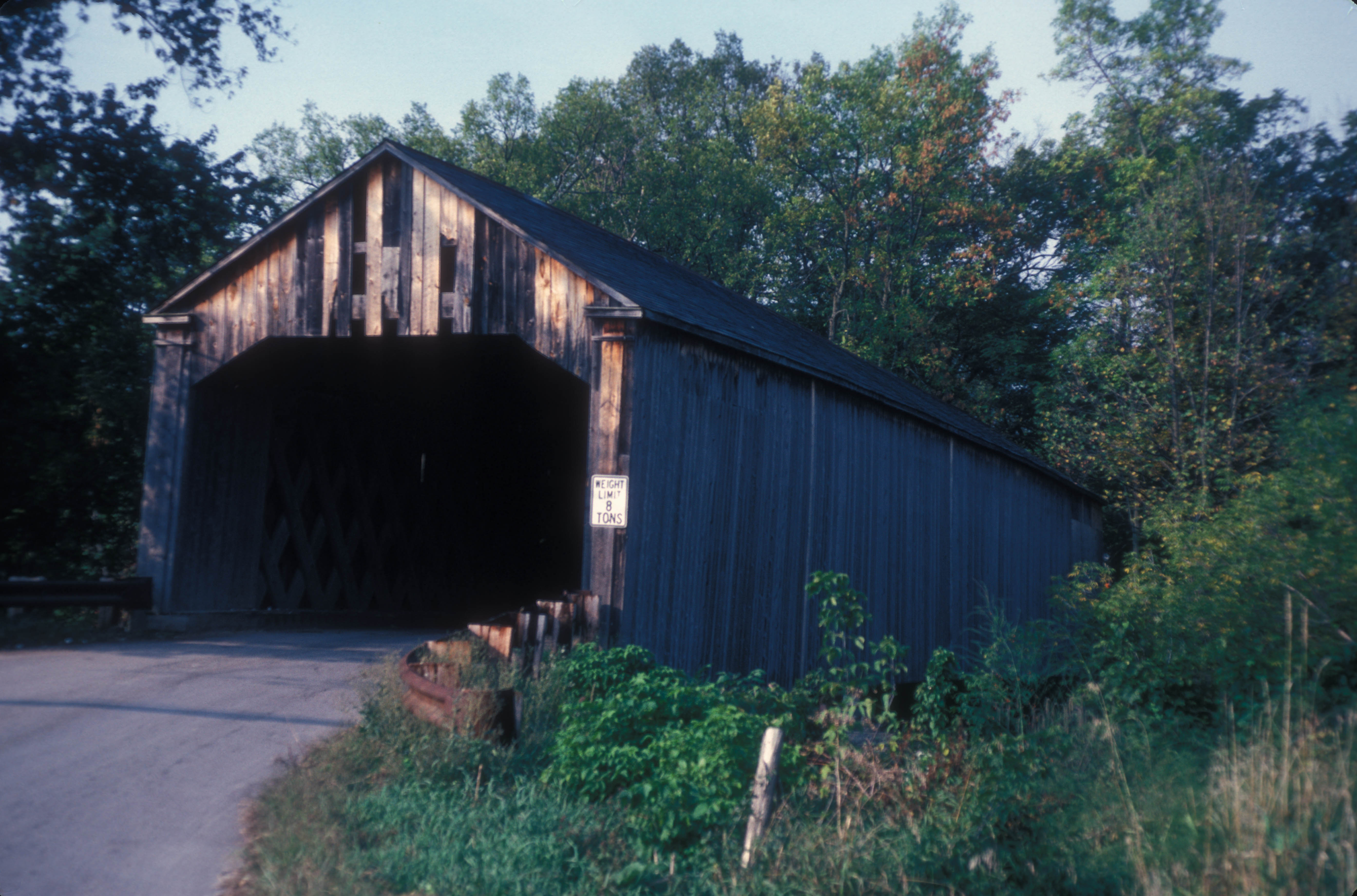

- Location within Vermont Location within the United States
- Location: Pearl St., west of Brandon, Vermont
- Coordinates: 43°47′22″N 73°6′45″W
- Area: 1 acre (0.40 ha)
- Built: c. 1840
- Architectural style: Town lattice truss
- NRHP reference No.: 74000258
- Added to NRHP: June 13, 1974

The Sanderson Covered Bridge is a historic covered bridge, which carries Pearl Street over Otter Creek in Brandon, Vermont. Built about 1840, it is one of Vermont's oldest covered bridges, and is the only remaining 19th century bridge in Brandon. It was listed on the National Register of Historic Places in 1974.

== Description and history ==
The Sanderson Covered Bridge is located about 1.3 miles (2.1 km) west of Brandon's village center, on Pearl Street, a secondary road providing access to Brandon's west side and neighboring Sudbury. The bridge is a single-span Town lattice truss, with a truss length of 123 feet (37 m) and a total structure length of 131.5 feet (40.1 m). The bridge rests on abutments built out of marble slabs reinforced with concrete. It has a roadway width of 18 feet (5.5 m) and a total width of 21.5 feet (6.6 m). The exterior is finished in vertical board siding, and its portals are framed by crude pilasters. The road deck is wooden, and laminated beams have been attached to the underside of the structure for added strength.

The bridge was built about 1840, and was one of two surviving covered bridges in Brandon when it was listed on the National Register of Historic Places. The Dean Covered Bridge, Brandon's other 19th-century covered bridge, was destroyed by an arsonist in 1986.

== See also ==
- National Register of Historic Places listings in Rutland County, Vermont
- List of bridges on the National Register of Historic Places in Vermont
- List of Vermont covered bridges
