= Robert Forguites =

American politician (1938–2019)

Member of the Vermont House of Representatives from the Windsor-3-2 district
- In office 2015 – April 7, 2019

Personal details
- Born: November 24, 1938 Forest Dale, Vermont, U.S.
- Died: April 8, 2019 (aged 80) Vermont, U.S.
- Party: Democratic
- Children: Adam
- Profession: Banking

Robert Joseph Forguites (November 24, 1938 – April 8, 2019) was an American politician in the state of Vermont.

== Background ==
Forguites was born in Forest Dale, Vermont. He graduated from Brandon High School. Forguites served on the Town of Brandon Board of Selectmen and on the Otter Valley Union High School Board of Directors. Foguites was involved with the banking business. He was a member of the Vermont House of Representatives, sitting as a Democrat from the Windsor-3-2 district, having been first elected in 2014. Forguites died in his sleep on April 8, 2019, while serving his third term in the legislature.
