= Colonel Ephraim and Sarah Doolittle Farm =

- U.S. National Register of Historic Places
- U.S. Historic district
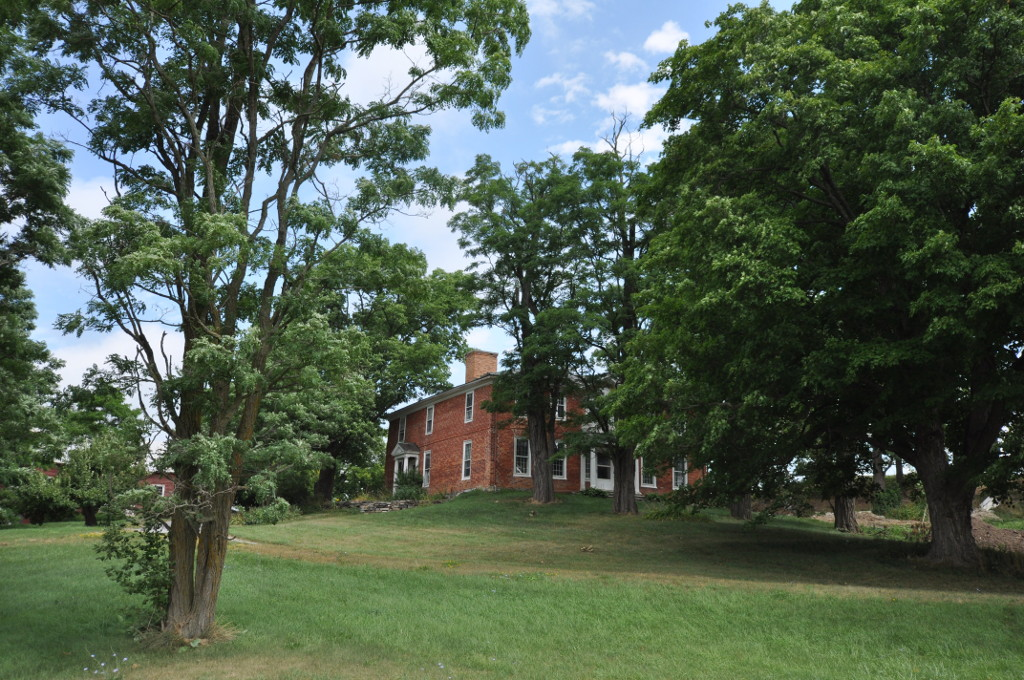

- Location within Vermont Location within the United States
- Location: 1 mile (1.6 km) E of VT 22A on Doolittle Rd., Shoreham, Vermont
- Coordinates: 43°56′19″N 73°18′16″W
- Area: 180 acres (73 ha)
- Built: 1766
- Built by: Job Lane Howe
- Architectural style: Federal
- MPS: Agricultural Resources of Vermont MPS
- NRHP reference No.: 94001523
- Added to NRHP: January 6, 1995

The Colonel Ephraim and Sarah Doolittle Farm is a historic farm property on Doolittle Road in Shoreham, Vermont. It is one of the oldest colonial farm properties in western Vermont, established in 1766 by Colonel Ephraim Doolittle, a veteran of the French and Indian War and the American Revolutionary War. It was listed on the National Register of Historic Places in 1995.

== Description and history ==
The Doolittle Farm is located in northern Shoreham, on 180 acres (73 ha) bounded on the west by Vermont Route 22A, the south by Doolittle Road, and the north by the Shoreham-Bridport town line. The western portion of the farm is wooded, and includes Prickly Ash Brook, which flows northeasterly across the property. The eastern portion is open, with fields of pasture and agriculture. The farm complex is set on the north side of Doolittle Road, east of the brook between the cleared and wooded areas. In addition to the c. 1800 farmhouse, the complex includes a carriage barn, three agricultural barns from the mid-to-late 19th century, and several smaller outbuildings. The farmhouse is a particularly fine example of early Federal period architecture, built of brick laid in common bond and covered by a hip roof.

The farm was established in 1766 by Colonel Ephraim Doolittle, a colonial militia officer who helped build the Crown Point Military Road, the area's first road, part of which runs along Doolittle Road. Doolittle established a gristmill and sawmill on Prickly Ash Brook, whose foundational remnants survive. Doolittle was one of the founding proprietors of Shoreham, chartered in 1788, and was a prominent local citizen for many years. The house, dating about 1800, was probably built by Job Lane Howe, a prominent area builder credited with building other fine Federal period houses in the region.

== See also ==
- National Register of Historic Places listings in Addison County, Vermont
- Massachusetts Line
