= First inauguration of Calvin Coolidge =

6th United States intra-term presidential inauguration

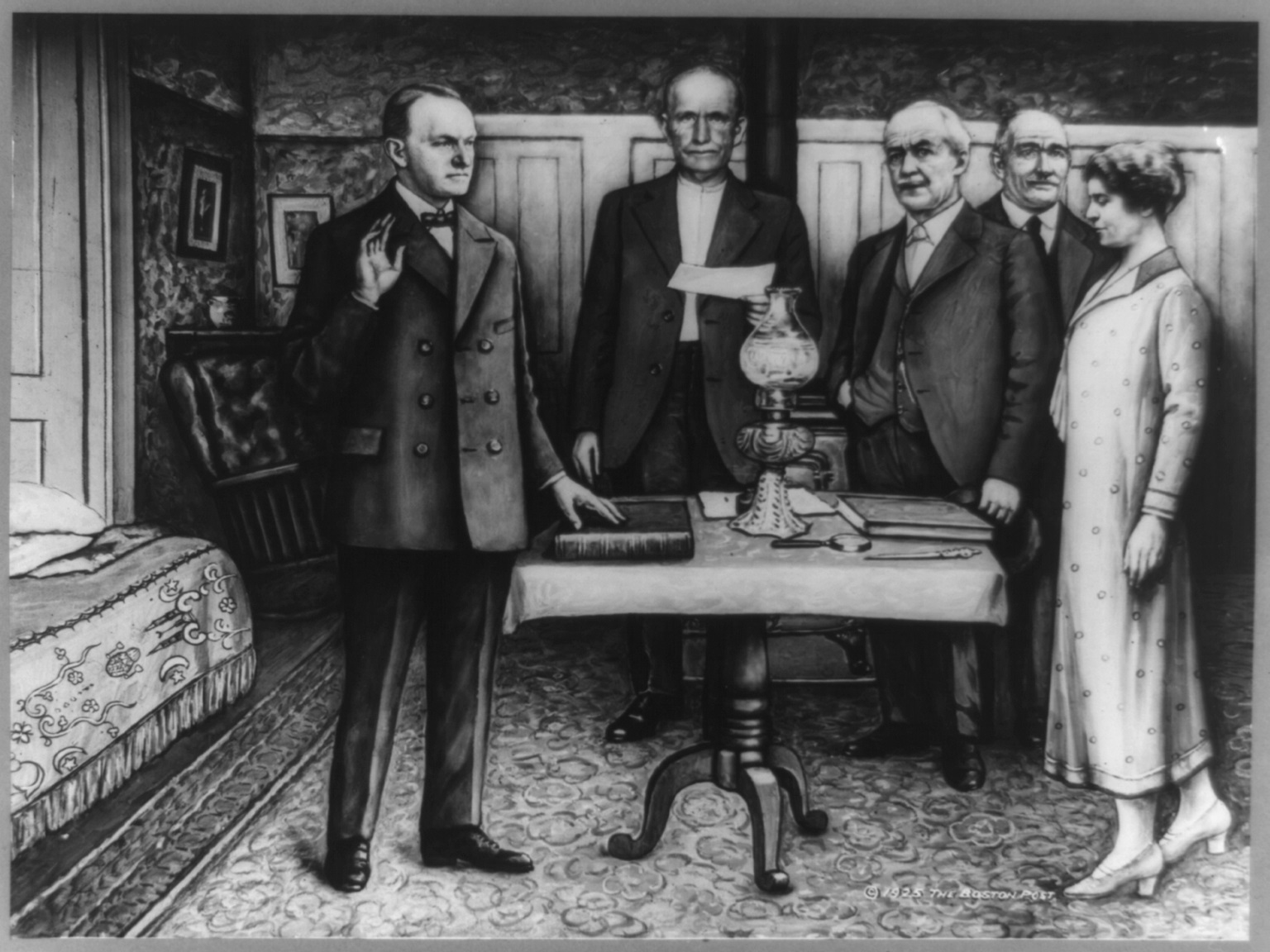
- First correct composite photograph made of President Coolidge's first dramatic inaugural in Plymouth, VT. The oath is being administered by notary Colonel John Coolidge, the president's father, and witnessed by Mrs. Grace Coolidge, Porter H. Dale, and Leonard L. Lane.
- Date: August 3, 1923; 103 years ago August 21, 1923
- Location: Coolidge Homestead, Plymouth Notch, Vermont (August 3) Willard Hotel, Washington, D.C. (August 21)
- Participants: Calvin Coolidge; 30th president of the United States — Assuming office John Calvin Coolidge Sr. Vermont justice of the peace — Administering oath (August 3) Adolph A. Hoehling Jr. Associate Justice of the United States District Court for the District of Columbia — Administering oath (August 21)

The first inauguration of Calvin Coolidge as the 30th president of the United States was held on Friday, August 3, 1923, at the Coolidge Homestead in Plymouth Notch, Vermont, following the death of President Warren G. Harding the previous evening. The inauguration – the sixth non-scheduled, extraordinary inauguration to ever take place – marked the commencement of the first term (a partial term of 1 year, 213 days) of Calvin Coolidge as president. The presidential oath of office was administered to the new president by his father, John Calvin Coolidge Sr., who was a Vermont notary public and justice of the peace. On Tuesday, August 21, 1923, President Coolidge repeated the oath before Justice Adolph A. Hoehling Jr. of the Court of the District of Columbia at the Willard Hotel, Washington, D.C.

== Midnight, August 2–3, 1923 ==
Vice President Calvin Coolidge was visiting his family property, the Coolidge Homestead, in Vermont, which did not have electricity or a telephone, when he received word by messenger of Harding's death. As the new president, Coolidge intended to take the oath of office and greet reporters who had assembled outside. He dressed in an upstairs bedroom, said a prayer, and came downstairs.

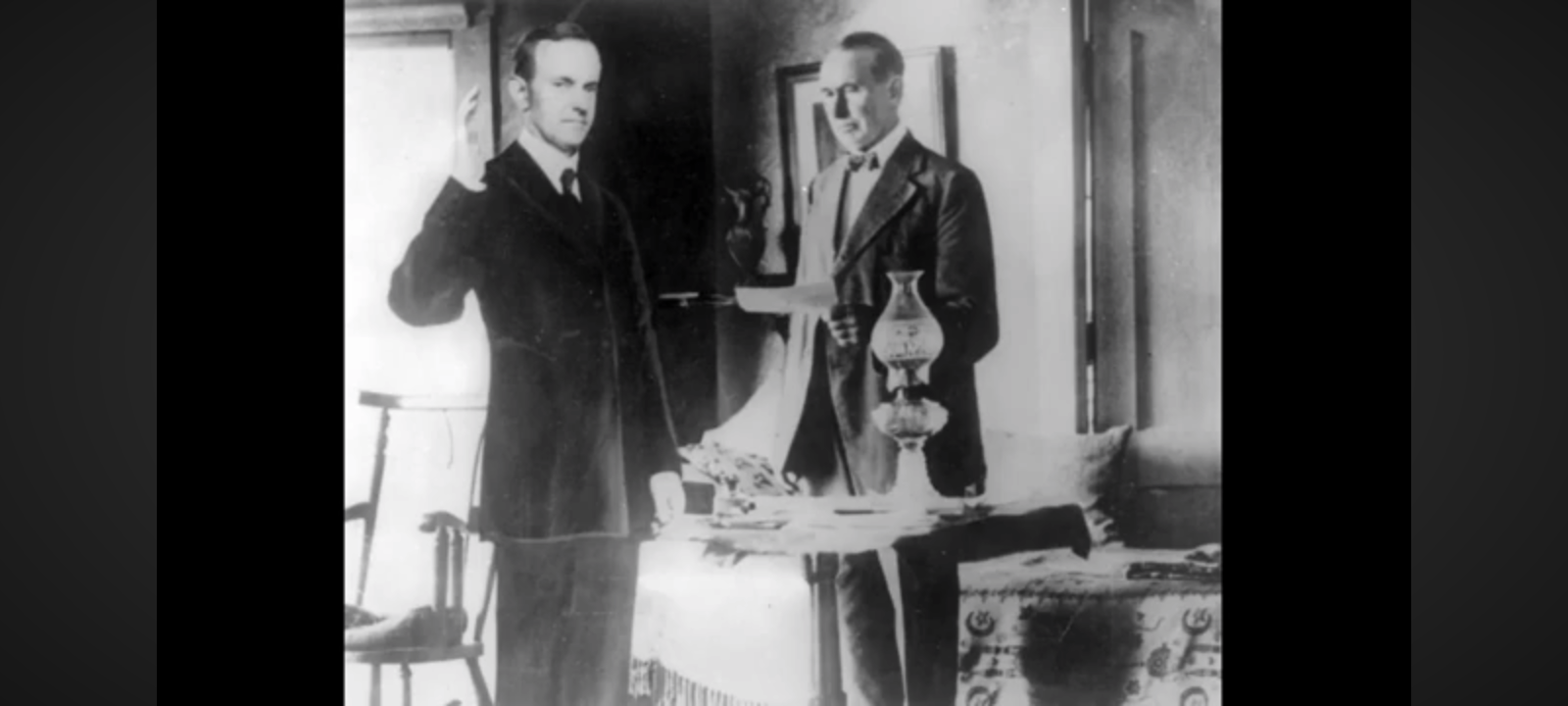
Calvin Coolidge taking the oath of office, 1923

In front of a small group of observers, including Coolidge's wife Grace and United States Representative Porter H. Dale, his father, John Calvin Coolidge Sr., a Vermont notary public and justice of the peace, administered the oath of office. The swearing in took place in John Coolidge's family parlor by the light of a kerosene lamp at 2:47 a.m. on August 3, 1923; President Coolidge then went back to bed.

Dale was campaigning for the United States Senate when he heard of Harding's death. He traveled to John Coolidge's home with reporter Joe Fountain, Herbert P. Thompson, the commander of Springfield's American Legion Post, and labor union official L. L. Lane. Dale had intended to ensure that Calvin Coolidge was informed that Harding had died, and to offer any assistance he could provide. As a result, Fountain was the only reporter present for the oath-taking. By most accounts, it was Dale who suggested persistently that Coolidge be sworn in immediately to ensure continuity in the presidency. Dale later wrote an account of this event which was published as a magazine article. The ceremony was recreated for photographers the following morning. The Coolidge State Park is now nearby.

Albert W. Harvey, the United States Marshal for the District of Vermont, arrived in Plymouth about three hours after Coolidge was sworn in. He acted as bodyguard for Coolidge until Secret Service agents from Boston took over the duty after they caught up to his train in Rutland while he was returning to Washington, D.C.

== The second oath ==
Coolidge returned to Washington the next day, and Justice Adolph A. Hoehling Jr. of the Court of the District of Columbia administered the oath a second time, on August 21, 1923, as there was a question about whether a state official had the authority to administer the federal presidential oath. The United States Constitution requires the president to take an oath at the beginning of his term, but it does not identify the person or officer who is to administer the oath. It is traditional for the Chief Justice of the United States to administer the oath, but that is not a constitutional requirement. When George Washington was sworn in on April 30, 1789, neither the Supreme Court nor any other part of the federal judiciary had been created. The oath was administered by Robert Livingston, a New York state judicial officer.

Hoehling kept the second swearing-in a secret until confirming Harry M. Daugherty's revelation of it in 1932. When Hoehling confirmed Daugherty's story, he indicated that Daugherty, then serving as United States Attorney General, asked him to administer the oath at the Willard Hotel. According to Hoehling, he did not question Daugherty's reason for requesting a second oath-taking, but assumed it was to resolve any doubt about whether the first swearing-in was valid, since it had been administered by a state official.

== See also ==
- Presidency of Calvin Coolidge
- Second inauguration of Calvin Coolidge
- Coolidge Homestead
