= Rollin Amsden =

U.S. Marshal for Vermont

United States Marshal for the District of Vermont
- In office June 18, 1890 – June 9, 1894
- Preceded by: John Robinson
- Succeeded by: Emory S. Harris

Member of the Vermont Senate from Windsor County
- In office 1884–1886 Serving with Norman Paul, Elwin A. Howe
- Preceded by: Justus Dartt, James M. McIntosh, Elam M. Goodwin
- Succeeded by: Chester Pierce, Henry A. Fletcher, Daniel L. Cushing

Sheriff of Windsor County, Vermont
- In office 1880–1884
- Preceded by: Surrey W. Stimson
- Succeeded by: Gardner J Wallace

Personal details
- Born: June 19, 1829 West Windsor, Vermont, U.S.
- Died: January 27, 1899 (aged 69) Windsor, Vermont, U.S.
- Resting place: Ascutney Cemetery, Windsor, Vermont
- Party: Republican
- Spouse(s): Mary Ann Wilder (m. 1851-1880, her death); Sophronia C. Lawrence (m. 1881-1899, his death)
- Children: 3
- Occupation: Businessman; Government official

Rollin Amsden (June 19, 1829 – January 27, 1899) was an American businessman and government official in Vermont. A lifelong resident of Windsor County, Vermont, he served in town offices including constable, tax collector, and selectman. He also served as deputy sheriff and sheriff of Windsor County, and a member of the Vermont Senate. From 1890 to 1894, Amsden served as United States Marshal for the District of Vermont.

== Biography ==
Rollin Amsden was born in West Windsor, Vermont on June 19, 1829, a son of America Amsden and Anna Nancy (Child) Amsden. He was raised and educated in West Windsor, and moved to Windsor in 1846 to begin an apprenticeship at the Robbins & Lawrence metalworking company. Amsden was trained as a machinist, and worked at this trade until 1861. During the American Civil War, he won a contract to finish rifles for the E. G. Lamson Company, and this work lasted until the end of the conflict in 1865.

After the war, Amsden started a dealership in lumber, hardware, grain, and coal, which he operated successfully until his death. He was also involved in other Windsor businesses, including serving on the board of directors of the Windsor National Bank and the Windsor Savings Bank. In the 1890s, he served as superintendent of the Windsor Electric Light Company.

A Republican, Amsdern was long active in Windsor's town government. Among the offices in which he served were constable (1867-1870), selectman (1868-1869), and tax collector (1875-1880). He also served as the town's overseer of the poor, as village president, and as high bailiff of Windsor County.

In 1874, Amsden was a delegate to the state Republican convention. From 1868 to 1880, Amsden was a deputy sheriff of Windsor County, and he served as sheriff from 1880 to 1884. He was a delegate to the 1882 state Republican convention. In 1884, Amsden was elected to represent Windsor County in the Vermont Senate, and he served one term. He was appointed U.S. Marshal for Vermont in 1890, and he served until 1894. In the mid-1890s, Amsden also served as warden of the state prison in Windsor.

== Death and burial ==
Amsden became ill in mid-January 1899. He died at his home in Windsor on January 27, 1899. Amsden was buried at Ascutney Cemetery in Windsor; at his request, several of his longtime current and former employees served as pallbearers.

== Family ==
In 1851, Amsden married Mary Ann Wilder (1827-1880). They were the parents of three sons, Frank, Charles, and Henrie. In 1881, Amsden married Sophronia C. Lawrence (1840-1907).

== Sources ==
=== Newspapers ===
- "Windsor Village Corporation Meeting". Vermont Journal. Windsor, VT. March 6, 1869. p. 8 – via Newspapers.com.
- "Delegates to the State Convention". Burlington Free Press. Burlington, VT. June 16, 1874. p. 3 – via Newspapers.com.
- "County Officers Elect". Burlington Free Press. Burlington, VT. October 12, 1876. p. 3 – via Newspapers.com.
- "The Republican Caucus". Vermont Journal. Windsor, VT. June 24, 1882. p. 8 – via Newspapers.com.
- "Annual Meeting: Windsor Savings Bank". Vermont Journal. Windsor, VT. January 19, 1884. p. 8 – via Newspapers.com.
- "Windsor National Bank". Springfield Reporter. Springfield, VT. October 10, 1884. p. 3 – via Newspapers.com.
- "Personal Mention: Rollin Amsden". Burlington Free Press. Burlington, VT. December 3, 1897. p. 5 – via Newspapers.com.
- "Hon. Rollin Amsden". Vermont Journal. Windsor, VT. February 4, 1899. p. 8 – via Newspapers.com.
- "Meeting: Windsor Electric Light Co". Vermont Journal. Windsor, VT. February 18, 1899. p. 8 – via Newspapers.com.
