= Emory S. Harris =

U.S. Marshal for Vermont

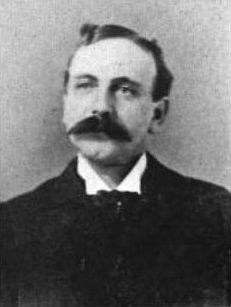
- The Vermonter magazine, August 1900

Chairman of the Vermont Democratic Party
- In office June 14, 1900 – July 29, 1914
- Preceded by: John H. Senter
- Succeeded by: Fred C. Brown

Member of the Vermont House of Representatives from Bennington
- In office October 5, 1898 – October 2, 1900
- Preceded by: Charles H. Darling
- Succeeded by: Charles N. Powers

United States Marshal for the District of Vermont
- In office June 9, 1894 – June 13, 1898
- Preceded by: Rollin Amsden
- Succeeded by: Fred A. Field

Personal details
- Born: March 24, 1858 Hoosick, New York, U.S.
- Died: December 17, 1926 (aged 68) Bennington, Vermont, U.S.
- Resting place: Old Bennington Cemetery, Bennington, Vermont
- Party: Democratic
- Spouse: Addie S. Warren (m. 1881-1926, his death)
- Education: Troy (New York) Business College
- Occupation: Farmer; Businessman; Government official

Emory S. Harris (March 24, 1858 - December 17, 1926) was a Vermont public official. A Democrat, among the offices in which he served were member of the Vermont House of Representatives (1898-1900) and United States Marshal for Vermont (1894-1898).

== Early life ==
Emory Stearns Harris was born in Hoosick, New York on March 24, 1858, a son of Ebenezer Stearns Harris (1834-1880) and Elizabeth B. (Rudd) Harris (1825-1902). Harris moved to Bennington, Vermont in 1876. He was a graduate of North Bennington High School and graduated from Troy (New York) Business College in 1877.

== Career ==
Harris was active in a variety of enterprises, including owning and operating a farm. His other ventures included undertaker, furniture sales, cigar store owner, and insurance agent. He belonged to the Bennington Board of Trade.

A Democrat, Harris was chairman of the Vermont Democratic Party from 1900 to 1914. He served in several local offices including town lister, justice of the peace and member of the board of selectmen, and president of the village board of trustees. A Democrat in an era when the Republican Party dominated Vermont politics, Harris was an unsuccessful candidate for several offices, including judge of probate (1888) and lieutenant governor (1900).

From 1885 to 1889, Harris was Deputy U.S. Marshal for Vermont, serving under Marshal John Robinson. In 1894, Harris was appointed United States Marshal for Vermont, succeeding Rollin Amsden. He served until 1898, and was succeeded by Fred A. Field. From 1898 to 1900, Harris represented Bennington in the Vermont House of Representatives.

After serving as a US Marshal, Harris owned and operated the Green Mountain Detective Agency, a private investigative service. He served as Bennington's postmaster from 1914 to 1923.

== Personal life ==
In 1881, Harris married Addie S. Warren (1862-1937). They were married until his death and had no children.

His civic memberships included the Odd Fellows, Elks, Improved Order of Red Men, and Bennington County Fish and Game Club.

Harris died in Bennington on December 17, 1926. He was buried at Bennington Old Cemetery in Bennington.

Party political offices
| Preceded by A. Allyn Olmsted | Democratic nominee for Lieutenant Governor of Vermont; 1900 | Succeeded by Elisha May |
