= Edward L. Burke =

U.S. Marshal for Vermont

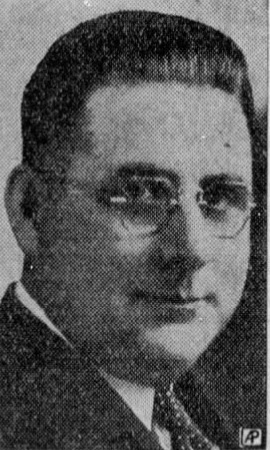
- Barre Daily Times (Barre, Vermont), August 26, 1935

United States Marshal for the District of Vermont
- In office June 7, 1935 – February 13, 1954
- Preceded by: Albert W. Harvey
- Succeeded by: Dewey H. Perry

Personal details
- Born: April 10, 1899 Rutland, Vermont, U.S.
- Died: October 22, 1982 (aged 83) Rutland, Vermont, U.S.
- Resting place: Calvary Cemetery, Rutland, Vermont
- Party: Republican
- Spouse: Ellen E. Cooley (m. 1922-1982, his death)
- Children: 2
- Education: St. Peter's Commercial School, Rutland, Vermont
- Occupation: Public official

Edward L. Burke (April 10, 1899 – October 22, 1982) was a public official in Rutland, Vermont. He served as Rutland's assistant city treasurer from 1917 to 1935 and U.S. Marshal for Vermont from 1935 until 1954.

== Biography ==
Edward L. Burke was born in Rutland, Vermont on April 10, 1899, a son of Edward and Margaret (née Carroll) Burke. He was educated in the parochial schools of Rutland and attended St. Peter's Commercial School, a post-high school business training institute operated by Rutland's Sisters of St. Joseph convent.

After completing his education, Burke was employed at the Combination Store, a downtown Rutland variety retailer. He later worked for the Rutland Railroad. In 1917, Burke was appointed Rutland's assistant city treasurer, and he served in this position until 1935. Active in politics as a Democrat, in 1934 he was the party's unsuccessful nominee for Vermont State Treasurer.

In 1935, Burke was appointed U.S. Marshal for Vermont, succeeding Albert W. Harvey. Harvey, a Republican, served during the administrations of Republicans Warren G. Harding, Calvin Coolidge, and Herbert Hoover. The expiration of Harvey's term enabled Roosevelt, a Democrat who took office in 1933, to name a Democrat to the marshal's position.

Burke served as Marshal during the rest of Roosevelt's term and during the term of Roosevelt's Democratic successor, Harry S. Truman. He retired in February 1954, enabling Truman's Republican successor Dwight D. Eisenhower to name a Republican as Vermont's U.S. Marshal, and Burke was succeeded by Dewey H. Perry.

In addition to his government service, Burke was involved in civic and fraternal organizations. This list included Rutland's Christ the King church, the Knights of Columbus, Fraternal Order of Eagles, Rutland Community Chest, and the March of Dimes.

Burke died in Rutland on October 22, 1982. He was buried at Calvary Cemetery in Rutland.

== Family ==
On April 18, 1922, Burke married Ellen E. Cooley (1900–1985) of Rutland. They were the parents of two daughters, Mary and Patricia.
