= Thomas W. Sorrell =

U.S. Marshal for Vermont

United States Marshal for the District of Vermont
- In office August 3, 1961 – June 20, 1969
- Preceded by: Dewey H. Perry
- Succeeded by: Christian Hansen Jr.

Personal details
- Born: November 22, 1917 Burlington, Vermont, U.S.
- Died: March 18, 1984 (aged 66) Burlington, Vermont, U.S.
- Resting place: Resurrection Park Cemetery, South Burlington, Vermont
- Party: Democratic
- Spouse: Esther Elizabeth Hartigan (m. 1942)
- Children: 5, including William Sorrell
- Occupation: Law enforcement officer

Military service
- Allegiance: United States
- Branch/service: United States Army
- Years of service: 1942-1945
- Rank: Technical Sergeant
- Unit: United States Army Air Forces
- Battles/wars: World War II

Thomas W. Sorrell (November 22, 1917 – March 18, 1984) was a career law enforcement officer from Vermont. He was most notable for his service as U.S. Marshal for Vermont from 1961 to 1969.

== Biography ==
Thomas William Sorrell was born in Burlington, Vermont on November 22, 1917, a son of William and Irene (née Proulx) Sorrell. He attended the parochial schools of Burlington, and was a 1936 graduate of Burlington's Cathedral High School. Before joining the military, Sorrell was employed by The Burlington Free Press as an apprentice printer.

Sorrell served in the United States Army Air Forces during World War II. After enlisting in 1942, his duty stations included Dow Field, Maine, Bradley Field, Connecticut, and Langley Air Force Base, Virginia. Sorrell attained the rank of technical sergeant and was discharged at the end of the war in 1945.

After his military service, Sorrell joined the Burlington Police Department, where he served from 1947 to 1953. He was a member of the Burlington Police Commission from 1957 to 1960. From 1953 to 1961, Sorrell was an investigator for the Central Vermont Railway. In addition, he served as a deputy sheriff for Chittenden County from 1953 to 1961.

Following the election of John F. Kennedy, a Democrat to the presidency in 1960, in 1961 Democrat Sorrell succeeded Dewey H. Perry, a Republican, as U.S. Marshal for Vermont. Sorrell served until 1969, and was succeeded by Christian Hansen Jr. Beginning in 1969, Sorrell was a criminal investigator for the Colchester Police Department. In 1977, he was appointed as Burlington's city constable and tax collector.

Sorrell died in Burlington on March 18, 1984. He was buried at Resurrection Park in South Burlington.

== Family ==
In June 1942, Sorrell married Esther Elizabeth Hartigan. Esther Hartigan Sorrell was active in building the Vermont Democratic Party into a viable statewide organization following a century of Republican dominance. She won a seat in the Vermont Senate in 1972 and served from 1973 to 1983.

Thomas and Esther Sorrell were the parents of four daughters and a son – Mary Beth, Karen, Anne, Micaela, and William. William Sorrell served as Vermont Attorney General from 1997 to 2017.
