= Second inauguration of Calvin Coolidge =

35th United States presidential inauguration

Second presidential inauguration of Calvin Coolidge
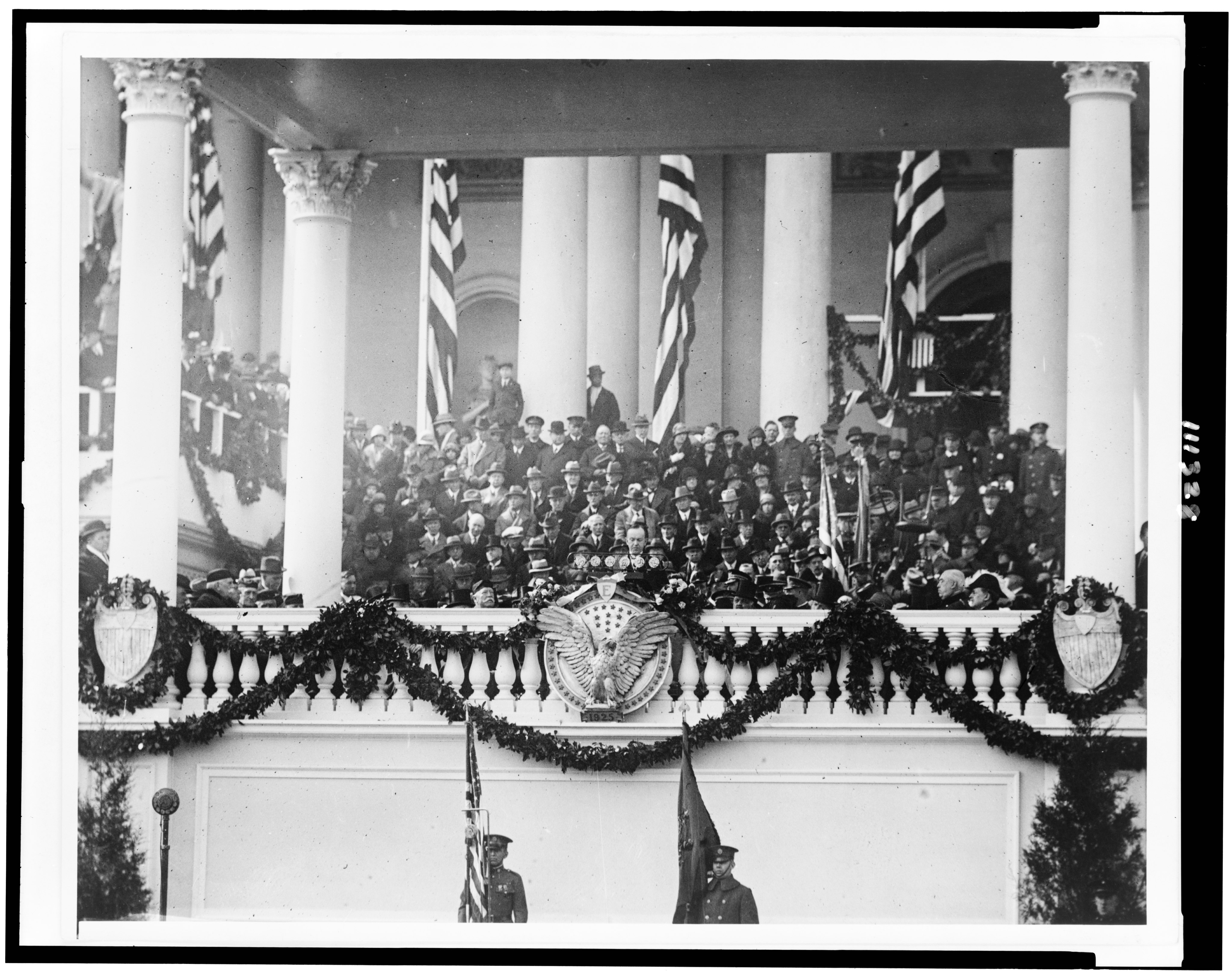
- Coolidge speaking at his second inauguration
- Date: March 4, 1925; 101 years ago
- Location: United States Capitol, Washington, D.C.
- Organized by: Joint Congressional Committee on Inaugural Ceremonies
- Participants: Calvin Coolidge; 30th president of the United States — Assuming office William Howard Taft; Chief Justice of the United States — Administering oath Charles G. Dawes; 30th vice president of the United States — Assuming office Albert B. Cummins; President pro tempore of the United States Senate — Administering oath

The second inauguration of Calvin Coolidge as president of the United States, was held on Wednesday, March 4, 1925, at the East Portico of the United States Capitol in Washington, D.C. This was the 35th presidential inauguration and marked the commencement of the second and only full term of Calvin Coolidge as president and the only term of Charles G. Dawes as vice president. Chief Justice William Howard Taft, who had served as president from 1909 to 1913, administered the oath of office. This was the first inauguration on which a former U.S. president administered the Oath and the first to be broadcast nationally on radio.

The vice-presidential oath of office was administered by the president pro tempore of the United States Senate, Albert B. Cummins. At the time, vice presidents were sworn into office in the Senate Chamber of the capitol, and would give an inaugural address before everyone headed on to the outside platform where the president would take the oath. Dawes made a fiery, half-hour address denouncing the rules of the Senate, the seniority system, and many other Senate customs. Coolidge's address was barely mentioned in the news reports the next day.

In administering the oath, Taft incorrectly recited the phrase "preserve, protect and defend" as "protect, preserve and defend".

== Gallery ==
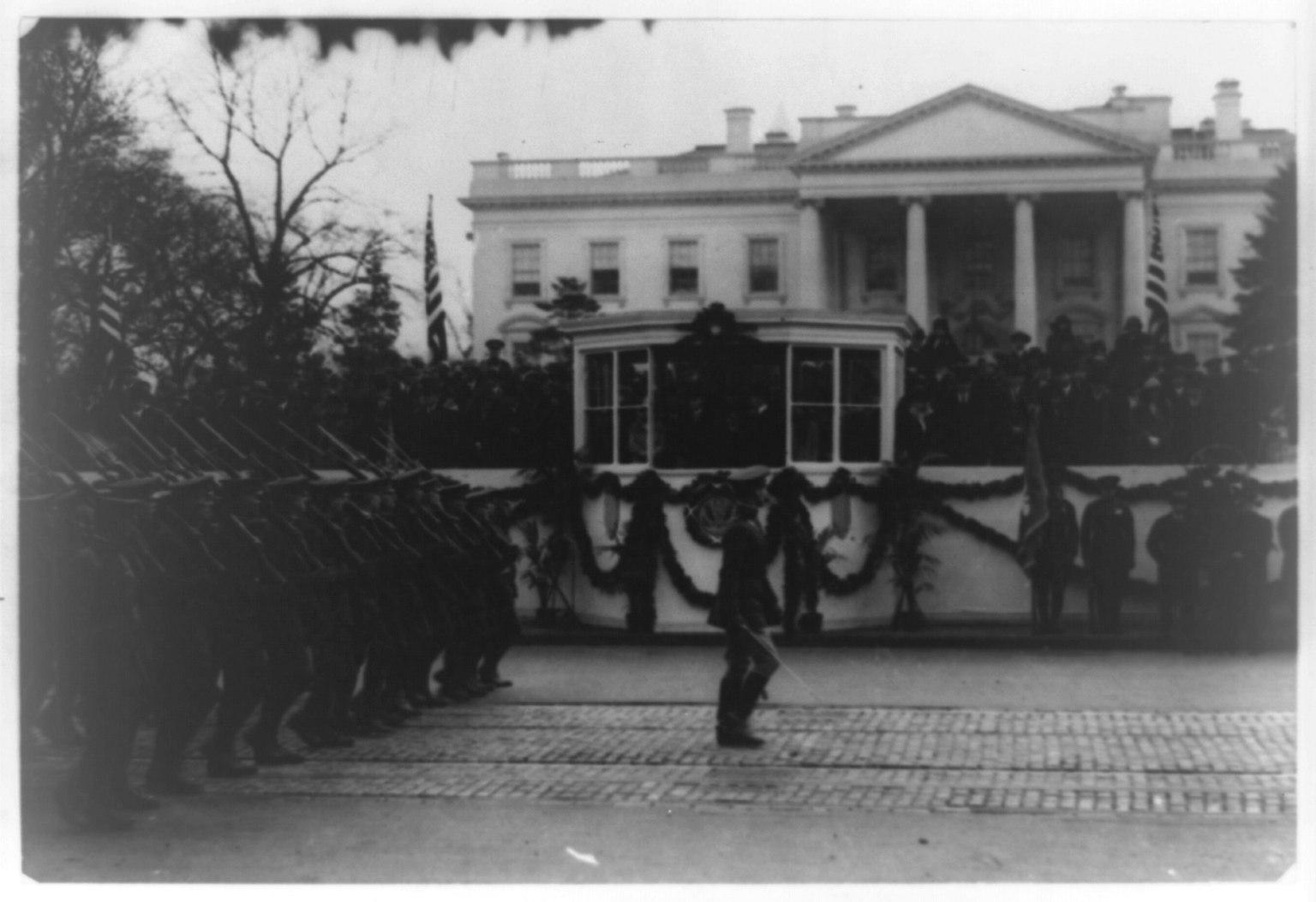
U.S. presidential inauguration. Calvin Coolidge on platform in front of White House reviewing military parade

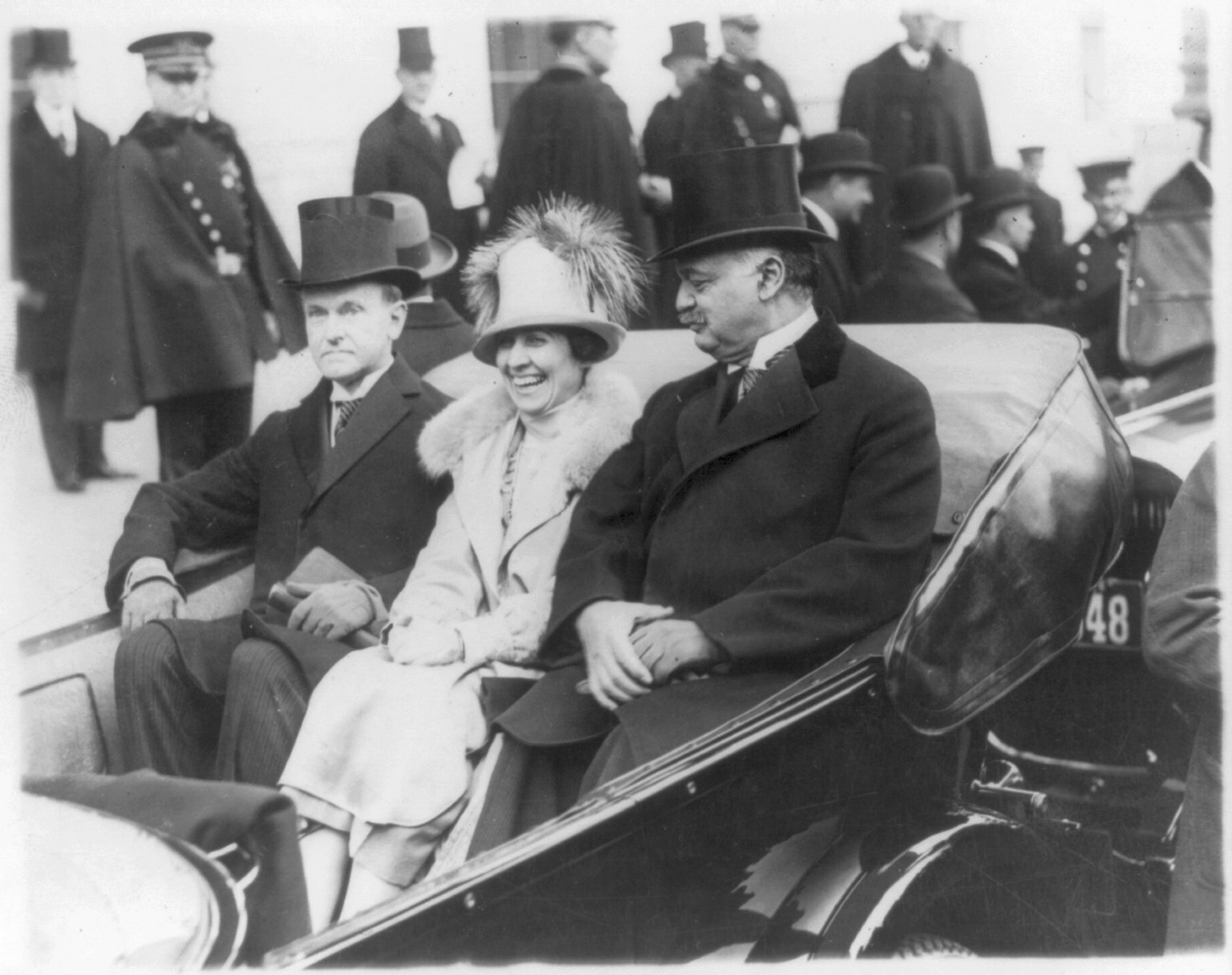
Washington, D.C. - inauguration of Calvin Coolidge - Coolidges and Sen. Curtis in open carriage on way to Capitol

== See also ==
- Presidency of Calvin Coolidge
- First inauguration of Calvin Coolidge
- 1924 United States presidential election
