= Horace W. Bailey =

U.S. Marshal for Vermont (1852–1914)

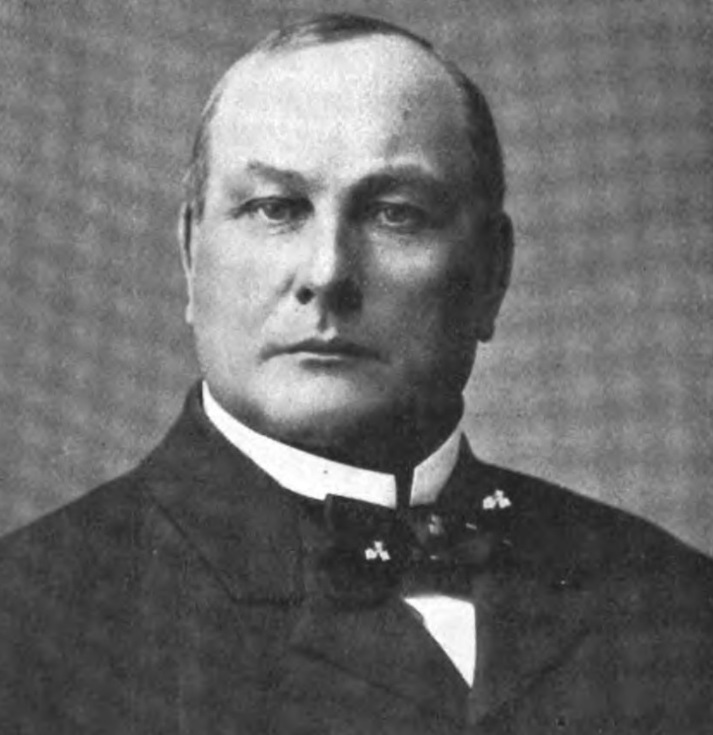
- Bailey as depicted in a 1903 edition of The Vermonter magazine

United States Marshal for the District of Vermont
- In office October 21, 1903 – January 6, 1914
- Preceded by: Frank H. Chapman
- Succeeded by: Arthur P. Carpenter

Member of the Vermont House of Representatives from Newbury
- In office 1902–1904
- Preceded by: Hammon T. Baldwin
- Succeeded by: Albert W. Silsby

Member of the Vermont Senate from Orange County
- In office 1894–1896 Serving with Joseph K. Darling
- Preceded by: John H. Watson, William H. Dubois
- Succeeded by: Cassius Peck, Caleb C. Sargent

Personal details
- Born: January 16, 1852 Newbury, Vermont, U.S.
- Died: January 6, 1914 (aged 61) Rutland, Vermont, U.S.
- Resting place: Oxbow Cemetery, Newbury, Vermont
- Party: Republican
- Education: Newbury Seminary
- Occupation: Government official

Horace W. Bailey (January 16, 1852 – January 6, 1914) was a Vermont politician and government official. A Republican, he was most notable for his service as a member of the Vermont Senate from Orange County (1894–1896), a member of the Vermont House of Representatives from Newbury (1902–1904), and the United States Marshal for the District of Vermont from 1903 until his death.

== Early life ==
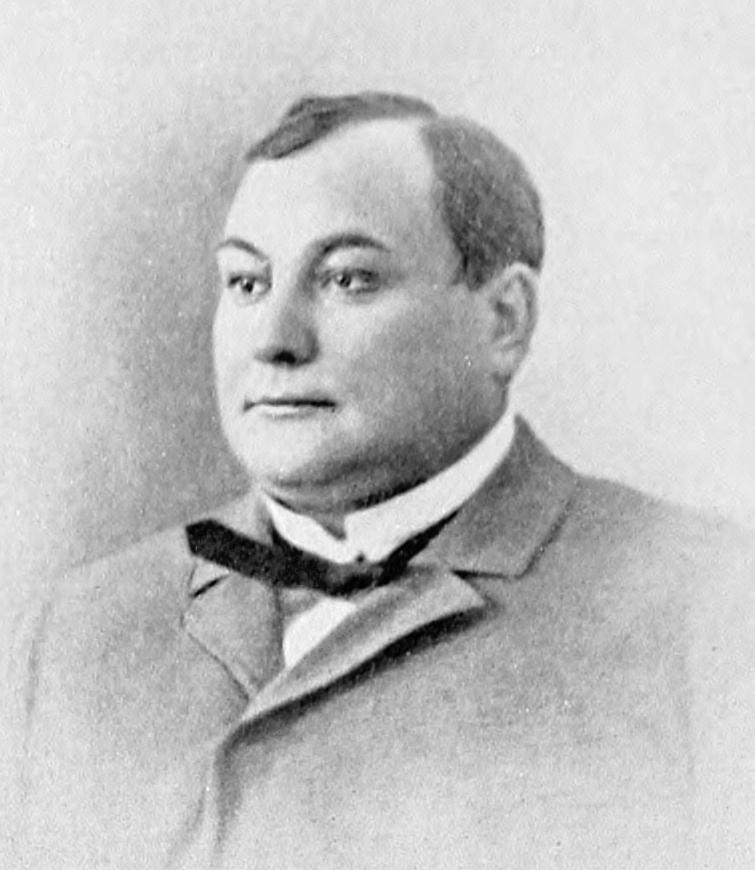
From 1894's Men of Vermont Illustrated

Horace Ward Bailey was born in Newbury, Vermont on January 16, 1852, a son of William U. Bailey and Abigail (née Eaton) Bailey. He was educated in the schools of Newbury and graduated from Newbury Seminary. He taught school in Newbury, then met John Lindsey, the proprietor of the Fabyan House resort hotel in New Hampshire. Bailey became a manager at Lindsey hotels; besides the Fabyan House, he worked at resorts in Lancaster, New Hampshire, Old Orchard Beach, Maine, and Eastman, Georgia. Bailey was the executor of Lindsey's estate, which led to a later career settling estates in northern Vermont and northern New Hampshire.

In 1882, Bailey returned to Newbury, where he became the owner of a general store, which he operated until 1892. A Republican, in 1886 he was elected Newbury's town clerk, a position he held until 1896. In addition to serving as town clerk, Bailey served in other local offices, including lister, town school board member, town school superintendent, and member of the county school board.

== Continued career ==
Bailey served in the Vermont Senate from 1894 to 1896, and was a member of the committees on education, railroads, and the state prison, as well as a joint committee that examined unexpected spending increases on the prison. He was also appointed a member of the state Fish and Game Commission in 1894, and he served until 1900. As a Fish and Game commissioner, Bailey was credited with management improvements at the state fish hatchery, and was also selected to oversee construction of a dam at the outlet of Lake Morey in Fairlee. He was a member of the Vermont Republican State Committee from 1894 to 1904.

In 1902, Bailey was elected to represent Newbury in the Vermont House of Representatives, and he served until 1904. During his tenure in the House, Bailey was chairman of the committee on railroads, as well as the committee that oversaw Vermont's participation in the 1904 Louisiana Purchase Exposition. In addition, he was Orange County's representative on the joint committee that studied the temperance issue. In 1902, Bailey was appointed to the state Railroad Commission, and he served until 1904. From 1906 to 1910, Bailey was a member of the Lake Champlain Tercentenary Commission, which planned celebrations to commemorate Samuel de Champlain's discovery of the lake in 1609.

A civic activist, Bailey was head of the board of trustees for Newbury's Tenney Memorial Library. He was an author on Vermont topics, including histories of Lake Champlain, Newbury Seminary and Newbury Methodist Church, and served as a vice president of the Vermont Historical Society. He was also a longtime member of the Independent Order of Odd Fellows and Knights of Pythias, served on the board of directors of St. Johnsbury's Citizens Savings Bank and Trust, and was a trustee of the Bradford Savings Bank.

== US Marshal ==
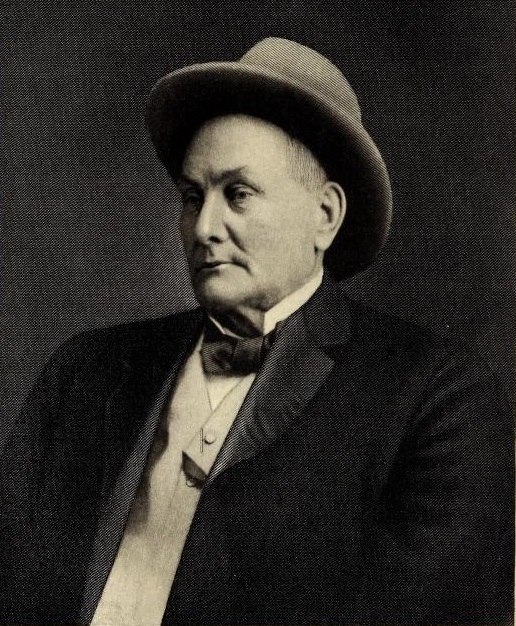
Bailey in his later years

In October 1903, Bailey was appointed U.S. Marshal for Vermont, and he served in this position until his death. He received the appointment following the October 15, 1903 termination of Marshal Fred A. Field's commission. Field was accused of dereliction and neglect after three prisoners he was transporting in June 1903 effected an escape. Federal district court judge Hoyt Henry Wheeler then appointed Field's chief deputy Frank H. Chapman to temporarily fill the vacancy.

Following Field's removal, President Theodore Roosevelt asked Vermont's Congressional delegation to recommend a replacement. The two US Senators and two US Representatives quickly agreed to suggest Bailey. Roosevelt appointed him a few days after Chapman's interim appointment, and Bailey then reappointed Chapman as chief deputy. For most of his term as marshal, Bailey lived and worked in Rutland, Vermont.

For many years, Bailey's girth and ongoing health problems required him to walk with the aid of a cane. Over time, he amassed a notable collection of canes and walking sticks. This collection was covered in newspapers nationwide in 1904, after Bailey received a carved bamboo cane from a friend in the U.S. Army who had recently returned from a trip to Japan. According to contemporary press accounts, Bailey's collection included a lignum vitae cane from the Philippines which was a gift from Mason S. Stone, and one made of pine recovered from the floor of the Confederacy's Civil War-era Libby Prison.

== Death and burial ==
In his later years, Bailey suffered from Bright's disease, which led to several complications. In 1907 he lost a foot to amputation, but an artificial replacement enabled him to continue to walk. In 1913 continued complications caused doctors to remove his other foot. Bailey died in Rutland on January 6, 1914. He was buried at Oxbow Cemetery in Newbury. Bailey never married, and had no children.

== Legacy ==
During his lifetime, Bailey amassed a vast collection of works related to the history of Vermont, including many rare books, pamphlets, town histories, and railroad annual reports. His collection included works from 1794 to his death, including many on slavery and other political topics. After his death, Bailey's executors sold his library. His pamphlet collection of more than 900 items was purchased intact by Middlebury College, which maintains Bailey's Vermont Pamphlet Archive as part of its library's Special Collections.

In 1904, Bailey purchased Newbury's old schoolhouse, which had been constructed in 1839, as a repository for his private library of works on the history of Vermont. After his death, the building was used by different owners for several different functions. The building was purchased by the town in 1969 for use as the town clerk's office, and was partially destroyed during a 1973 tornado. It was later restored, and is now the Horace W. Bailey Club, a meeting facility for several different organizations and civic groups. The Bailey Club is part of the Newbury Village Historic District, which was added to the National Register of Historic Places in 1983.

== Sources ==
=== Books ===
- Carleton, Hiram (1903). Genealogical and Family History of the State of Vermont. Vol. I. New York, NY: Lewis Publishing Company. pp. 642–643. ISBN 9780806347943 – via Google Books.
- Dodge, Prentiss Cutler (1912). Encyclopedia of Vermont Biography. Burlington, VT: Ullery Publishing. pp. 106–107 – via Internet Archive.
- Spencer, Thomas E. (1998). Where They're Buried. Baltimore, MD: Clearfield Company. p. 375. ISBN 978-0-8063-4823-0 – via Google Books.

=== Newspapers ===
- "Field Removed". The Daily Journal. Montpelier, VT. October 15, 1903. p. 1 – via Newspapers.com.
- "Marshal Field's Successor". Montpelier Evening Argus. Montpelier, VT. October 19, 1903. p. 1 – via Newspapers.com.
- "Vermont's New Marshal". Montpelier Evening Argus. Montpelier, VT. October 22, 1903. p. 3 – via Newspapers.com.
- "US Marshals Appointed". Barre Daily Times. Barre, VT. November 4, 1903. p. 1 – via Newspapers.com.
- "A Collection of Canes". Burlington Clipper. Burlington, VT. January 16, 1904. p. 2 – via Newspapers.com.
- "Valuable Collection of Canes". Cheyenne County Rustler. St. Francis, KS. February 4, 1904. p. 5.
- "Delegates to Chicago". The Chelsea Herald. Chelsea, VT. April 21, 1904. p. 1 – via Newspapers.com.
- "Leading Vermonter Dies at Rutland". Burlington Daily News. Burlington, VT. January 7, 1914. p. 5 – via Newspapers.com.
- "The Bailey Library". Brattleboro Reformer. Brattleboro, VT. April 29, 1916. p. 2 – via Newspapers.com.

=== Internet ===
- "Newbury: Horace W. Bailey Club". Cohase.org. Wells River, VT: Cohase Chamber of Commerce.
- DeLaittre, Margaret (August 4, 1983). "Newbury Village Historic District". National Register Nomination Information. Lebanon, NH: Connecticut River Joint Commissions.
- "Bailey's Vermont Pamphlet Archive". Special Collections. Middlebury, VT: Middlebury College Library.

== Additional resources ==
- Fish, Frank L. (1914). Horace Ward Bailey, Vermonter; A Memorial by his Friends. Rutland, VT: The Tuttle Company – via Internet Archive.
- Davidson, Jim (February 10, 2013). "Horace W. Bailey Gives a History Lesson - 1906". Moments in History (1:50 film clip). Rutland, VT: Rutland Historical Society – via Internet Archive.
