= Fred A. Field =

U.S. Marshal for Vermont (1850–1935)

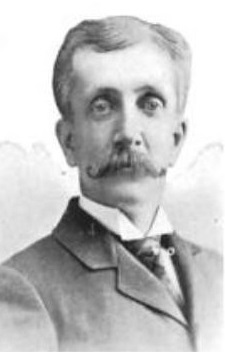
- The Vermonter magazine, August 1897

United States Marshal for the District of Vermont
- In office June 14, 1898 – October 15, 1903
- Preceded by: Emory S. Harris
- Succeeded by: Frank H. Chapman

Treasurer of Rutland City, Vermont
- In office 1894–1895
- Preceded by: Charles Clark
- Succeeded by: William L. Davis

Postmaster of Rutland City, Vermont
- In office 1889–1893
- Preceded by: Lyman W. Redington
- Succeeded by: John D. Hanrahan

Personal details
- Born: June 17, 1850 Brandon, Vermont, U.S.
- Died: April 18, 1935 (aged 84) Rutland City, Vermont, U.S.
- Resting place: Evergreen Cemetery, Rutland Town, Vermont
- Party: Republican
- Spouse: Lillie Clark (m. 1873–1935, his death)
- Children: 3
- Relatives: Henry F. Field (brother)
- Education: Burr and Burton Seminary, Manchester, Vermont
- Occupation: Businessman; Government official

Fred A. Field (June 17, 1850 – April 18, 1935) was a businessman and public official from Vermont. Among the offices in which he served, Field was United States Marshal for the District of Vermont from 1898 to 1903.

== Early life ==
Frederick A. Field (usually referred to as Fred A. Field) was born in Brandon, Vermont on June 17, 1850, a son of Minerva (Davenport) Field and William M. Field, who served as sheriff of Rutland County, a member of the Vermont Senate, and president of the Rutland Savings Bank. His family moved to Rutland in 1862 and Field was educated in the schools of Brandon and Rutland, and graduated from Burr and Burton Seminary in Manchester.

== Start of career ==
Field began his career as a clerk in the Rutland post office and advanced to become Rutland's assistant postmaster from 1872 to 1884. From 1884 to 1885, he was a U.S. postal inspector, with responsibility for law enforcement and oversight of an eighteen-state district. In 1885, he was reappointed Rutland's assistant postmaster, and he served until 1889.

A Republican, Field served Rutland village as a school board member and village trustee. After Rutland was incorporated as a city, he served as its treasurer from 1894 to 1895. He was the chairman of Rutland's Republican committee, and secretary and chairman of the Rutland County committee.

From 1889 to 1893, Field served as Rutland's postmaster. In addition to his work for the post office, Field operated an investment brokerage, which dealt in stocks, bonds, and real estate.

A longtime civic activist, Fields' professional and fraternal memberships included the board of trustees of the Rutland Savings Bank and the Rutland Board of Trade, of which he was a charter member. Field was also a director of Rutland's People's Gas Light Company, treasurer of Rutland's Evergreen Cemetery, treasurer of the State Mutual Fire Insurance Company, and secretary of the Rutland Improvement League. In addition, he was also a member of the Masons, Knights of Pythias, and Elks.

== U.S. Marshal ==
In 1898, Field was appointed U.S. Marshal for Vermont, succeeding Emory S. Harris. He served until 1903, and was succeeded on a temporary basis by Frank H. Chapman.

Field's commission was terminated by President Theodore Roosevelt on October 15, 1903. The termination resulted from a June 1903 incident in which he was accused of dereliction and neglect after three Chinese prisoners he was transporting effected an escape. Field argued that responsibility rested with the transportation company contracted to deport the prisoners, but when the incident became public knowledge, Field was removed from office.

After Field was removed, Vermont's federal district judge, Hoyt Henry Wheeler appointed Chapman, then serving as Field's chief deputy, to temporarily fill the vacancy. Chapman acted as marshal for five days, after which Horace W. Bailey was appointed as Field's permanent replacement. Bailey then reappointed Chapman as chief deputy.

== Later life ==
After leaving office, Field was the principal of a Rutland real estate and insurance agency, Fred A. Field & Son. Despite his advanced age, he remained active in the business until a few weeks before his death. He maintained an interest in Rutland's civic life; in 1933 he was chairman of a Chamber of Commerce committee that successfully lobbied for construction of new federal building in Rutland.

== Death and burial ==
Field died in Rutland on April 18, 1935. He was buried at Evergreen Cemetery in Rutland.

== Family ==
In 1873, Field married Lillie Clark (1854–1942) of Rutland. They were the parents of three sons, Richard, William and Fred Jr.

Field's siblings included Henry F. Field, who served as Vermont State Treasurer from 1890 to 1898.

== Sources ==
=== Books ===
- Dodge, Prentiss Cutler (1912). Encyclopedia of Vermont Biography. Burlington, VT: Ullery Publishing Company. pp. 188–189 – via Internet Archive.

=== Magazines ===
- "Honored Vermonters: Hon. Fred A. Field". The Vermonter. St. Albans, VT: Charles Spooner Forbes. August 1897 – via Google Books.

=== Newspapers ===
- "Rutland's Postmaster". Rutland Herald. Rutland, VT. June 26, 1889. p. 1 – via Newspapers.com.
- "Rutland Reapings: William M. Field". Argus and Patriot. Montpelier, VT. October 22, 1890. p. 2 – via Newspapers.com.
- "Vermont: Fred A. Field". Vermont Watchman and State Journal. Montpelier, VT. June 22, 1898. p. 2 – via Newspapers.com.
- "Fred A. Field, Dealer in Investment Securities". Manchester Journal. Manchester, VT. June 23, 1898. p. 4 – via Newspapers.com.
- "Marshal F. A. Field Removed from Office". Barre Daily Times. Barre, VT. October 15, 1903. p. 1 – via Newspapers.com.
- "U. S. Marshal Field Removed". Rutland Herald. Rutland, VT. October 16, 1903. p. 4 – via Newspapers.com.
- "Deputy United States Marshal Frank H. Chapman". Rutland Herald. Rutland, VT. October 17, 1903. p. 4 – via Newspapers.com.
- "Horace W. Bailey". Rutland Herald. Rutland, VT. November 3, 1903. p. 4 – via Newspapers.com.
- "Fred A. Field, Sr., Dies at Age of 84". Rutland Herald. Rutland, VT. April 19, 1935. p. 1 – via Newspapers.com.
- "Funeral Held for Fred A. Field, Sr". Burlington Free Press. Burlington, VT. April 22, 1935. p. 2 – via Newspapers.com.
