= Albert W. Harvey =

U.S. Marshal for Vermont

United States Marshal for the District of Vermont
- In office June 2, 1922 – June 6, 1935
- Preceded by: Arthur P. Carpenter
- Succeeded by: Edward L. Burke

Personal details
- Born: March 10, 1879 Sutton, New Hampshire, U.S.
- Died: January 3, 1956 (aged 76) Rutland, Vermont, U.S.
- Resting place: Brookside Cemetery, Chester, Vermont
- Party: Republican
- Spouse: Emma Henry (m. 1912-1946, her death)
- Education: Tufts College (attended)
- Occupation: Salesman; Hardware store owner Public official

Albert W. Harvey (March 10, 1879 – January 3, 1956) was a Vermont businessman and government official. He served as Vermont's U.S. Marshal from 1922 to 1935.

== Early life ==
Albert Walter Harvey was born in Sutton, New Hampshire on March 10, 1879, a son of Frederick Harvey and Estelle (née Hart) Harvey. He was raised and educated in Concord, New Hampshire, and graduated from Professor Amos Hadley's Private School in Concord. He attended Tufts College for two years.

== Start of career ==
In 1900, Harvey began a business career as a traveling salesman for the Fitchburg Hardware Company. He remained with the company for 11 years, when he bought a hardware store in Chester, Vermont. Harvey owned and operated the store until he became Vermont's U.S. Marshal.

A Republican, Harvey served on the party's committee in Windsor County for many years. He served several terms as Chester's town agent in the 1920s and 1930s. He was a justice of the peace and also served as a trustee of Chester Academy and president of the Chester Board of Trade.

== United States Marshal ==
In May 1922, Vermont's Congressional delegation recommended Harvey to succeed Arthur P. Carpenter as the state's U.S. Marshal. President Warren G. Harding concurred and nominated Harvey in June.

When Calvin Coolidge succeeded to the presidency on August 3, 1923, while staying at his family's home in Plymouth, Vermont, Harvey arrived in Plymouth about three hours after Coolidge was sworn in. He acted as bodyguard for Coolidge until Secret Service agents from Boston took over the duty after they caught up to his train in Rutland while he was returning to Washington, D.C.

For most of his term, Harvey was heavily involved in efforts to enforce the Eighteenth Amendment, which prohibited the manufacture, transportation, and sale of alcoholic beverages. He continued to serve as U.S. Marshal until June 1935, when he was succeeded by Edward L. Burke.

== Later life ==
After leaving the marshal's office, Harvey frequently carried out duties as a commissioner appointed by the Windsor County Probate Court to settle the estates of individuals who had died without wills. In 1938, he unsuccessfully sought the Republican nomination for Windsor County Sheriff. In the 1940s, he served as Chester's town grand juror. During World War II, he was appointed as the appeal agent for Windsor County Draft Board Number 2.

Harvey was a longtime member of the Masons and was a member of Chester's St. Luke's Episcopal Church. He was a longtime trustee of Chester's Whiting Library and president of Chester's Rod and Gun Club.

== Death and burial ==
Harvey died from surgical complications at the hospital in Rutland, Vermont on January 3, 1956. He was buried at Brookside Cemetery in Chester.

== Family ==
In 1912, Harvey married Emma Henry (1875–1946) of Chester, whose grandfather Hugh H. Henry had also served as U.S. Marshal. They remained married until her death and had no children.
