= Forest Dale, Vermont =

- Village
- Location within Vermont Location within the United States
- Coordinates: 43°49′40″N 73°03′13″W
- Country: United States
- State: Vermont
- County: Rutland
- Elevation: 594 ft (181 m)
- Time zone: UTC-5 (Eastern (EST))
  - Summer (DST): UTC-4 (EDT)
- ZIP Codes: 05745 (PO box); 05733 (Brandon)
- Area code: 802
- GNIS feature ID: 1460880

Forest Dale is an unincorporated village in the town of Brandon, Rutland County, Vermont, United States. The community is located at the intersection of Vermont Route 53 and Vermont Route 73 15.5 miles (24.9 km) north of Rutland. Forest Dale is served by ZIP code 05745 for a specific post office box and otherwise by 05733 (Brandon).

Robert Forguites (1938–2019), Vermont politician and businessman, was born in Forest Dale.

Frederick J. Bacon lived in Forest Dale between 1907 and 1914, operating his Bacon Manufacturing and Publishing Company, building banjos.
