= Frank H. Chapman =

U.S. Marshal for Vermont (1851–1923)

United States Marshal for the District of Vermont
- In office October 16, 1903 – October 21, 1903
- Preceded by: Fred A. Field
- Succeeded by: Horace W. Bailey

Personal details
- Born: March 8, 1851 Woodstock, Vermont, U.S.
- Died: June 29, 1923 (aged 72) Rutland City, Vermont, U.S.
- Resting place: Evergreen Cemetery, Rutland Town, Vermont
- Party: Republican
- Spouse: Florence E. Clark (m. 1885–1905, her death)
- Children: 2
- Occupation: Pharmacist; Government official

Military service
- Allegiance: United States; Vermont
- Branch/service: Vermont National Guard
- Years of service: 1881–1903
- Rank: First lieutenant

Frank H. Chapman (March 8, 1851 – June 29, 1923) was an American public official from Vermont. He served as Vermont's Deputy United States Marshal for more than 20 years (1901–1923), and was acting U.S. Marshal for Vermont for several days in 1903 following the removal of his predecessor.

== Early life ==
Frank Hyde Chapman was born in Woodstock, Vermont, on March 8, 1851, a son of druggist Charles Chapman and Emily Hyde (Whitney) Chapman. He was educated in Woodstock and his father trained him to join the family's pharmacy business. Chapman worked in Woodstock until 1880, when he moved to Rutland and purchased a drug store, which he operated as F.H. Chapman & Co. He later sold the store, after which he owned or worked at several other pharmacies in Rutland. In addition to working as a pharmacist and owning drug stores, Chapman also operated a real estate and insurance agency. A Republican, he served in local offices including assessor, member of the board of health, member of the liquor licensing commission, and justice of the peace.

== Military service ==
Chapman joined the Vermont National Guard in 1881, and was appointed a hospital steward in 1884. During the Spanish–American War, he was commissioned a first lieutenant on the staff of Vermont's 1st Brigade, and provided advice and guidance on hygiene and medical support for troops preparing to serve overseas. During his military service, Chapman was credited with design and creation of a medical supply chest that became standard issue for Vermont National Guard units in the mid-1880s, and was fielded United States Army-wide beginning in the early 1890s. He continued to serve until retiring in 1903. During and after his retirement, Chapman was the treasurer of the unit fund for Rutland's Company A, 1st Vermont Infantry Regiment, a post he held for a total of 42 years.

== Deputy U.S. Marshal ==
In 1901, Fred A. Field, the U.S. Marshal for Vermont, appointed Chapman as his deputy. Chapman remained in the position until 1923, serving under Field and his successors Horace W. Bailey and Arthur P. Carpenter. When Field's commission was terminated in 1903 after prisoners in his custody effected an escape, Chapman was appointed acting Marshal by Vermont's federal district judge, Hoyt H. Wheeler. He served for several days until Bailey was named as the permanent replacement for Field.

When Bailey became marshal, he reappointed Chapman as deputy. Bailey was in poor health beginning in 1907, which led to the amputation of both his feet, one in 1907 and one in 1913. Chapman performed the U.S. Marshal's duties during Bailey's prolonged absences.

Chapman's health began to fail in early 1923. He resigned as deputy in May and was succeeded by Esther E. Anderson, who had previously served as an assistant to Fred S. Platt, the clerk of Vermont's U.S. District Court.

== Death and burial ==
Chapman was unhappy about his declining health and on June 28, 1923, he attempted suicide by drowning himself in his bathtub. He was rescued by his nurse, but after she fell asleep on the morning of June 29, Chapman killed himself by going to the basement of his home, using a razor to slash arteries in his legs, and cutting his throat. He was buried at Evergreen Cemetery in Rutland.

== Family ==
In 1885, Chapman married Florence E. Clark (1863–1905). They were the parents of two children, son Charles H. Chapman (1888–1925) and daughter Mildred C. Chapman (1891–1965).

== Sources ==
=== Internet ===
- "Vermont Death Records, 1909–2008, Entry for Frank Hyde Chapman". Ancestry.com. Lehi, UT: Ancestry.com, LLC.

=== Newspapers ===
- "The Chapman-Clark Wedding". Rutland Herald. Rutland, VT. October 22, 1885. p. 5 – via Newspapers.com.
- "Death Notice, Mrs. Florence Chapman". Rutland Herald. Rutland, VT. June 9, 1905. p. 5 – via Newspapers.com.
- "Deputy United States Marshal Frank H. Chapman". Rutland Herald. Rutland, VT. October 17, 1903. p. 4 – via Newspapers.com.
- "Horace W. Bailey". Rutland Herald. Rutland, VT. November 3, 1903. p. 4 – via Newspapers.com.
- "License Board Named". Montpelier Morning Journal. Montpelier, VT. May 24, 1910. p. 1.
- "Leading Vermonter Dies at Rutland". Burlington Daily News. Burlington, VT. January 7, 1914. p. 5 – via Newspapers.com.
- "Frank H. Chapman Eyes Marshal Job". Vermont Standard. Woodstock, VT. November 25, 1920. p. 1 – via Newspapers.com.
- "Deputy Marshal 20 Years". St. Albans Messenger. St. Albans, VT. December 9, 1920. p. 5 – via Newspapers.com.
- "Woman Deputy Marshal". The Landmark. White River Junction, VT. May 24, 1923. p. 6 – via Newspapers.com.
- "Frank H. Chapman a Suicide". The Orwell Citizen. Orwell, VT. July 5, 1923. p. 3 – via Newspapers.com.
- "Mr. Chapman's Funeral Private". Vermont Standard. Woodstock, VT. July 5, 1923. p. 5 – via Newspapers.com.

=== Books ===
- City of Rutland, Vermont (1912). Annual Report. Rutland, VT: Dodge, The Printer. p. 123 – via Google Books.
- Gilmore, William H. (1904). Biennial Report of the Adjutant and Inspector General. Rutland, VT: The Tuttle Company. p. 69 – via Google Books.
- New York State Courts (1938). The New York Supplement. Eagan, MN: West Publishing Company. p. 30 – via Google Books.
- Rutland City Council (1894). Charter and Ordinances of the City of Rutland. Rutland, VT: Carruthers & Thomas. p. 324 – via Google Books.
