= Moses N. Wisewell =

American army officer (1827–1888)

Moses N. Wisewell (May 15, 1827 – April 11, 1888) was a Union Army officer during the American Civil War.

Moses N. Wisewell was born at Brandon, Vermont, May 15, 1827. He was a civil engineer and merchant before the Civil War.

As colonel, Wisewell commanded the 28th New Jersey Volunteer Infantry Regiment from September 22, 1862. At the Battle of Fredericksburg on December 13, 1862, he was seriously wounded. He was transferred to the Veteran Reserve Corps as a colonel on September 25, 1863. From November 9, 1863, to December 20, 1864, Wisewell served in the Veterans Reserve Branch, Provost Marshal General Department. He was in the Department of Washington from May 2, 1864, to December 15, 1864. He was transferred to take charge at the Union Army's prisoner of war camp at Johnson's Island, Ohio, from December 20, 1864. Wisewell resigned from the volunteers on October 1, 1865.

On January 13, 1869, President Andrew Johnson nominated Wisewell for appointment to the grade of brevet brigadier general of volunteers, to rank from March 13, 1865, for his service at the Battle of Fredericksburg, and the United States Senate confirmed the appointment on February 16, 1869.

Moses N. Wisewell died at New York City on April 11, 1888. He was buried at Pompton Plains, New Jersey.

== See also ==
- List of American Civil War brevet generals (Union)
