= Dewey H. Perry =

U.S. Marshal for Vermont

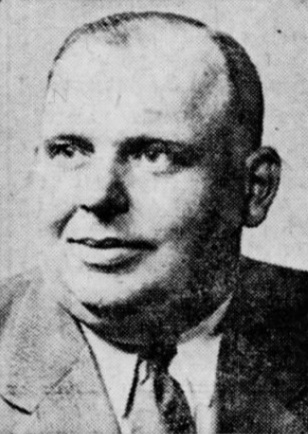
- Burlington Free Press, November 4, 1942

United States Marshal for the District of Vermont
- In office March 14, 1954 – August 2, 1961
- Preceded by: Edward L. Burke
- Succeeded by: Thomas W. Sorrell

Sheriff of Chittenden County, Vermont
- In office February 1, 1943 – March 13, 1954
- Preceded by: J. Frederick Lynch
- Succeeded by: Charles R. Barber

Personal details
- Born: June 6, 1898 Westford, Vermont, U.S.
- Died: October 21, 1970 (aged 72) Colchester, Vermont, U.S.
- Resting place: Fairview Cemetery, Essex Junction, Vermont
- Party: Republican
- Spouse: Irene Mae Thibault (m. 1929-1970, his death)
- Education: Norwich Free Academy, Norwich, Connecticut
- Occupation: Restaurant owner Public official

Dewey H. Perry (June 6, 1898 - October 21, 1970) was an American law enforcement officer from Vermont. He was most notable for his service as United States Marshal for the District of Vermont from 1954 to 1961.

== Early life ==
Dewey Howard Perry was born in Westford, Vermont on June 6, 1898, the son of Charles M. Perry and Etta (née Howard) Perry. He attended public schools in St. Albans, Fairfax and Underhill Vermont, and Holliston, Massachusetts. He graduated from Norwich Free Academy in Norwich, Connecticut. In 1917, he returned to Vermont to accept employment with American Express in Essex Junction, Vermont.

== Career ==
In 1926, Perry accepted a position as a special agent for the Central Vermont Railway, a position he held until 1930. From 1931 to 1941 he was the owner and operator of the Depot Restaurant in Essex Junction. In addition to managing the restaurant in partnership with his wife, Perry served as Deputy Sheriff of Chittenden County. A Republican, in 1942 Perry won the election for Sheriff. He served in this position until 1954.

Perry resigned as sheriff in order to accept appointment as Vermont's U.S. Marshal, succeeding Edward L. Burke. He served until 1961, and was succeeded by Thomas W. Sorrell. After leaving the marshal's office, Perry was appointed chief of the Essex Junction Police Department. He served as chief until 1968, after which he was appointed as the department's dispatcher. Perry retired in November 1969 and resided in Essex Junction.

== Death and burial ==
In his final months, Perry suffered from a long illness. He died at the hospital in Colchester on October 21, 1970. Perry was buried at Fairview Cemetery in Essex Junction.

== Personal life ==
In 1929, Perry married Irene Mae Thibault (1904–1982). In addition to his wife, Perry was survived by an aunt, an uncle, and a cousin. He was a member of the Benevolent and Protective Order of Elks, Ethan Allen Club, Lions Clubs International, and Shriners. As a member of the Freemasons, Perry advanced through the Scottish Rite's ranks to attain the 32nd degree.
