= Arthur P. Carpenter =

U.S. Marshal for Vermont

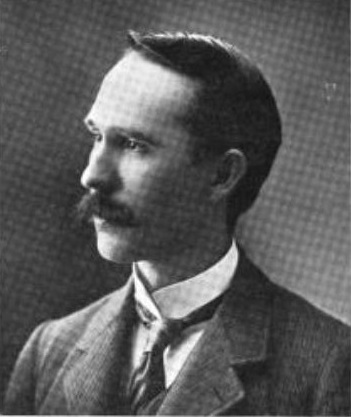
- From Volume III of 1904's Memoirs of the Judiciary and the Bar of New England of the Nineteenth Century

United States Marshal for the District of Vermont
- In office February 14, 1914 – June 1, 1922
- Preceded by: Horace W. Bailey
- Succeeded by: Albert W. Harvey

Judge of the Brattleboro, Vermont Municipal Court
- In office 1923–1929
- Preceded by: Frank D. E. Stowe
- Succeeded by: Orrin B. Hughes

Personal details
- Born: March 30, 1867 Readsboro, Vermont, U.S.
- Died: October 22, 1937 (aged 70) Boston, Massachusetts, U.S.
- Resting place: Arms Cemetery, Shelburne Falls, Massachusetts
- Party: Democratic
- Spouse: Addie Laura Boynton (m. 1897-1937, his death)
- Education: Castleton Normal School; Boston University
- Occupation: Attorney

Arthur P. Carpenter (March 30, 1867 – October 22, 1937) was an American attorney and government official from Vermont. A Democrat, among the offices in which he served was United States Marshal for the District of Vermont (1914–1922) and judge of the Brattleboro, Vermont municipal court (1923–1929).

== Early life ==
Arthur Perry Carpenter was born in Readsboro, Vermont on March 30, 1867, the son of Solomon R. and Laura M. (née Bishop) Carpenter. He was raised on his father's farm in Readsboro and attended the public schools. In 1887, Carpenter graduated from Castleton Normal School, after which he taught school at several locations in the Readsboro area. He attended a commercial course at Rochester Business University of Rochester, New York, from which he graduated in 1890.

While working as a bookkeeper, Carpenter studied law with attorney Stephen T. Davenport of Brattleboro, Vermont. He was admitted to the bar in 1896, and began a practice in North Adams, Massachusetts in partnership with Cornelius A. Parker. He received his LL.B. degree from Boston University School of Law in 1897. One of Carpenter's law school classmates was David I. Walsh, with whom he remained friendly after their graduation.

== Start of career ==
Carpenter and Parker practiced together until 1900, when they dissolved their partnership. Carpenter continued to practice in North Adams, and later opened a branch office in Readsboro.

As a resident of Whitingham, Vermont, Carpenter served in local offices including school board member. He served on the board of directors of the Berkshire County Cooperative Bank and was secretary of the Hoosac Valley Agricultural Society. Carpenter was a member of the Masonic lodge in Jacksonville, Vermont and the Royal Arcanum's Berkshire Council.

In 1904, Carpenter sold his law practice and planned to move to Michigan. He worked briefly as counsel for a corporation in Detroit before moving to Brattleboro, where he continued to practice law. A Democrat during an era when Republicans controlled Vermont's government, Carpenter was an unsuccessful candidate for several offices in Windham County, including state's attorney. In addition, he served for several years as chairman of the party in Brattleboro.

Despite his party affiliation, for several years Carpenter served as Brattleboro's town agent and town attorney and a justice of the peace. After becoming a resident of Brattleboro, Carpenter was active in the town's Order of Royal and Select Masters commandery and Knights Templar preceptory.

== United States Marshal ==
In February 1914, Carpenter was appointed U.S. Marshal for Vermont, succeeding Horace W. Bailey, who had died in January. He served until June 1922 and was succeeded by Albert W. Harvey. As marshal, one of Carpenter's first acts was to reappoint Frank H. Chapman as chief deputy marshal. Chapman had served as chief deputy since 1901 and had held the post under Carpenter's two immediate predecessors. He continued to serve until retiring in 1923.

During World War I, Carpenter was involved in arrests of suspected German agents and sympathizers. In addition, he enforced anti-immigration laws against individuals attempting to illegally cross the Canadian border. Carpenter also arrested US service members who committed crimes in Vermont or were reported as absent without leave or having deserted. After passage of the Eighteenth Amendment, which prohibited the manufacture and sale of alcohol, Carpenter arrested several individuals for selling hard cider and other alcoholic beverages.

== Later life ==
After his tenure as marshal ended, Carpenter resumed practicing law. In 1923 he was appointed judge of Brattleboro's municipal court, succeeding Frank D. E. Stowe. He was reappointed to successive two year terms and served until 1929, when he was succeeded by Orrin B. Hughes. In 1936 he was a delegate to the Vermont Democratic Party's state convention.

== Death and burial ==
Carpenter died in Boston on October 22, 1937. He received Masonic funeral rites at a memorial service in Brattleboro. Carpenter was buried at Arms Cemetery in Shelburne Falls, Massachusetts.

== Family ==
In 1897, Carpenter married Addie Laura Boynton (1875–1959). They were married until his death, and had no children.

== Sources ==
=== Books ===
- Carleton, Hiram (1903). Genealogical and Family History of the State of Vermont. Vol. II. New York, NY: Lewis Publishing Company. p. 105 – via Internet Archive.

=== Newspapers ===
- "Whitingham: Arthur P. Carpenter". Vermont Phoenix. Brattleboro, VT. July 22, 1904. p. 7 – via Newspapers.com.
- "Local Notes and Gossip: A. P. Carpenter". Brattleboro Reformer. Brattleboro, VT. November 17, 1905. p. 5.
- "Representative Fight Was Warm". Brattleboro Reformer. Brattleboro, VT. September 9, 1910. p. 1 – via Newspapers.com.
- "Windham County Democrats". Barre Daily Times. Barre, VT. July 31, 1912. p. 1 – via Newspapers.com.
- "Carpenter Gets Marshalship". Rutland Herald. Rutland, VT. February 12, 1914. p. 2 – via Newspapers.com.
- "Carpenter for U.S. Marshal". St. Albans Messenger. St. Albans, VT. February 19, 1914. p. 6 – via Newspapers.com.
- "Frank H. Chapman Reappointed". Rutland Herald. Rutland, VT. February 21, 1914. p. 4 – via Newspapers.com.
- "State's New United States Marshal". St. Albans Messenger. St. Albans, VT. April 15, 1914. p. 3 – via Newspapers.com.
- "Brattleboro Local: Arthur P. Carpenter". Brattleboro Reformer. Brattleboro, VT. July 10, 1915. p. 6 – via Newspapers.com.
- "Hold German Accused of Denouncing U.S." The Boston Globe. Boston, MA. April 14, 1917. p. 9 – via Newspapers.com.
- "Pretended to be Military Police". Brattleboro Reformer. Brattleboro, VT. October 22, 1918. p. 1 – via Newspapers.com.
- "Claim He Sold Hard Cider to Man Minus Leg". Rutland Herald. Rutland, VT. July 21, 1921. p. 1 – via Newspapers.com.
- "Newly Appointed U.S. Marshal in Rutland". Rutland Herald. Rutland, VT. June 29, 1922. p. 7 – via Newspapers.com.
- "Power Company Gets Verdict". Vermont Tribune. Ludlow, VT. October 20, 1922. p. 3 – via Newspapers.com.
- "A. P. Carpenter Vermont Judge". North Adams Transcript. North Adams, MA. January 26, 1923. p. 7 – via Newspapers.com.
- "Woman Deputy Marshal". The Landmark. White River Junction, VT. May 24, 1923. p. 6 – via Newspapers.com.
- "Orrin B. Hughes Is Appointed Brattleboro Municipal Judge". Brattleboro Reformer. Brattleboro, VT. March 16, 1929. p. 1 – via Newspapers.com.
- "Local Delegates in Barre Today". Brattleboro Reformer. Brattleboro, VT. May 14, 1936. p. 1 – via Newspapers.com.
- "Brattleboro Judge Dead at Age of 70". The Boston Globe. Boston, MA. October 23, 1937. p. 6 – via Newspapers.com.
- "Funeral Services Held for Judge Carpenter". North Adams Transcript. North Adams, MA. October 25, 1937. p. 3 – via Newspapers.com.
- "Mrs. Arthur Carpenter". Rutland Herald. Rutland, VT. September 26, 1959. p. 5 – via Newspapers.com.
