= Crown Point Road =

- Historic Crown Point Road
- U.S. National Register of Historic Places
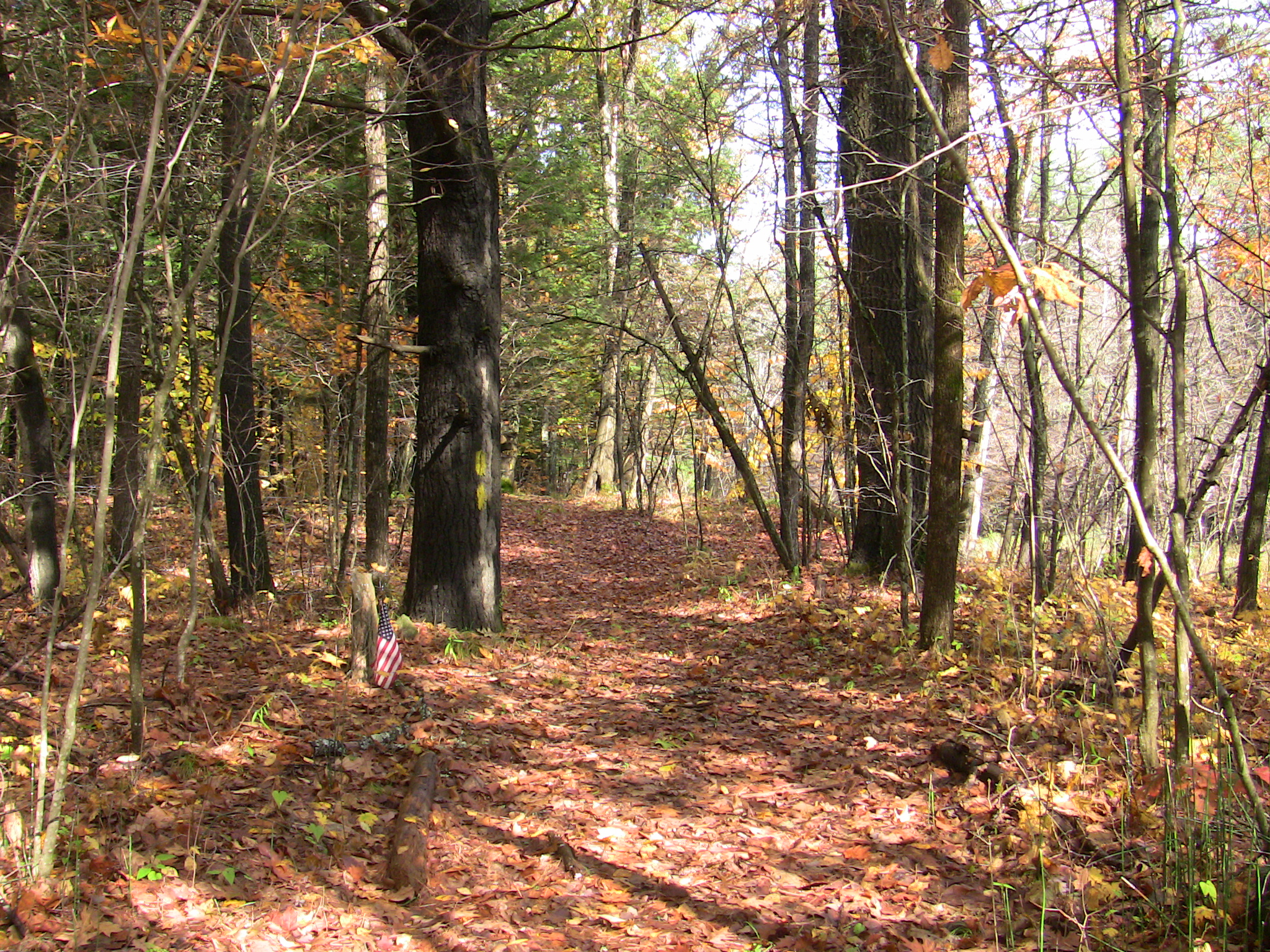

- Location within Vermont
- Location: Off VT 131, Weathersfield, Vermont
- Coordinates: 43°23′29″N 72°30′12″W
- Area: 4.5 acres (1.8 ha)
- NRHP reference No.: 74000270
- Added to NRHP: December 2, 1974

The Crown Point Road, or the Crown Point Military Road, is a historic road built in 1759-60, mostly in what is now the United States state of Vermont. It was built by British Army and colonial militia forces to connect Fort Crown Point near the southern end of Lake Champlain to the Fort at Number 4 in what is now Charlestown, New Hampshire. It was the first major road in Vermont, spurring development along its route after the French and Indian War. Fragments of the road are still visible in largely period condition, or have been paved over, while others have disappeared into the forest. Sections of the road located in Weathersfield have been listed on the National Register of Historic Places.

== Route ==
The Crown Point Road began at the Fort at Number 4, roughly where the center of Charlestown, New Hampshire is located, on the east side of the Connecticut River. It followed a generally northward route, reaching its river crossing point near the mouth of Beaver Brook. On the Vermont side of the river, it proceeded north-northwest through what are now Springfield and Weathersfield before bearing west across Cavendish. Roughly at the center of Cavendish, it again turned more north, turning west again between Plymouth and Ludlow toward Shrewsbury. It reached Otter Creek in Clarendon, and then followed that valley northward, through Rutland, Proctor, and Pittsford, before bearing northwest across the hills south of Brandon.

Near the junction of Vermont Routes 30 and 73 in northern Sudbury, a spur of the road headed west toward Fort Ticonderoga (passing through present-day Orwell), while the main road continued northwest through Whiting, Shoreham, and Bridport before finally reaching Lake Champlain opposite Fort Crown Point in present-day Addison.

== History ==
In 1759, British forces under the command of General Jeffery Amherst captured Fort Ticonderoga from the French in the later stages of the French and Indian War. Determined to maintain British control over the southern end of Lake Champlain, Amherst ordered the construction of Fort Crown Point, and the construction of the road joining it to the Fort at Number 4, then the northernmost British colonial outpost on the Connecticut River. The route roughly followed an old Native American trail, parallelling the Black River in its southern extent and Otter Creek in its northern. Early work on the road was performed by colonial militia forces commanded by Colonel John Stark. Work included the clearing of trees and stumps, construction of bridges across small streams, and the construction of corduroy sections across swampy terrain.

After the war, the road became a major route by which central southern Vermont was settled. As more and better roads were built through the region, portions fell into disuse and were abandoned, while others continued to be used and were improved. In the late 19th century, efforts were made to mark and commemorate the route, resulting in the placement of markers, some of which are still present along or near its route. In some communities, portions of the original route are named "Crown Point Road" or "Old Crown Point Road". A portion of the route, some of it still in little-altered condition, is found in the area of Stoughton Pond in northern Springfield. This and other nearby portions in Springfield and Weathersfield were listed on the National Register of Historic Places in 1974.

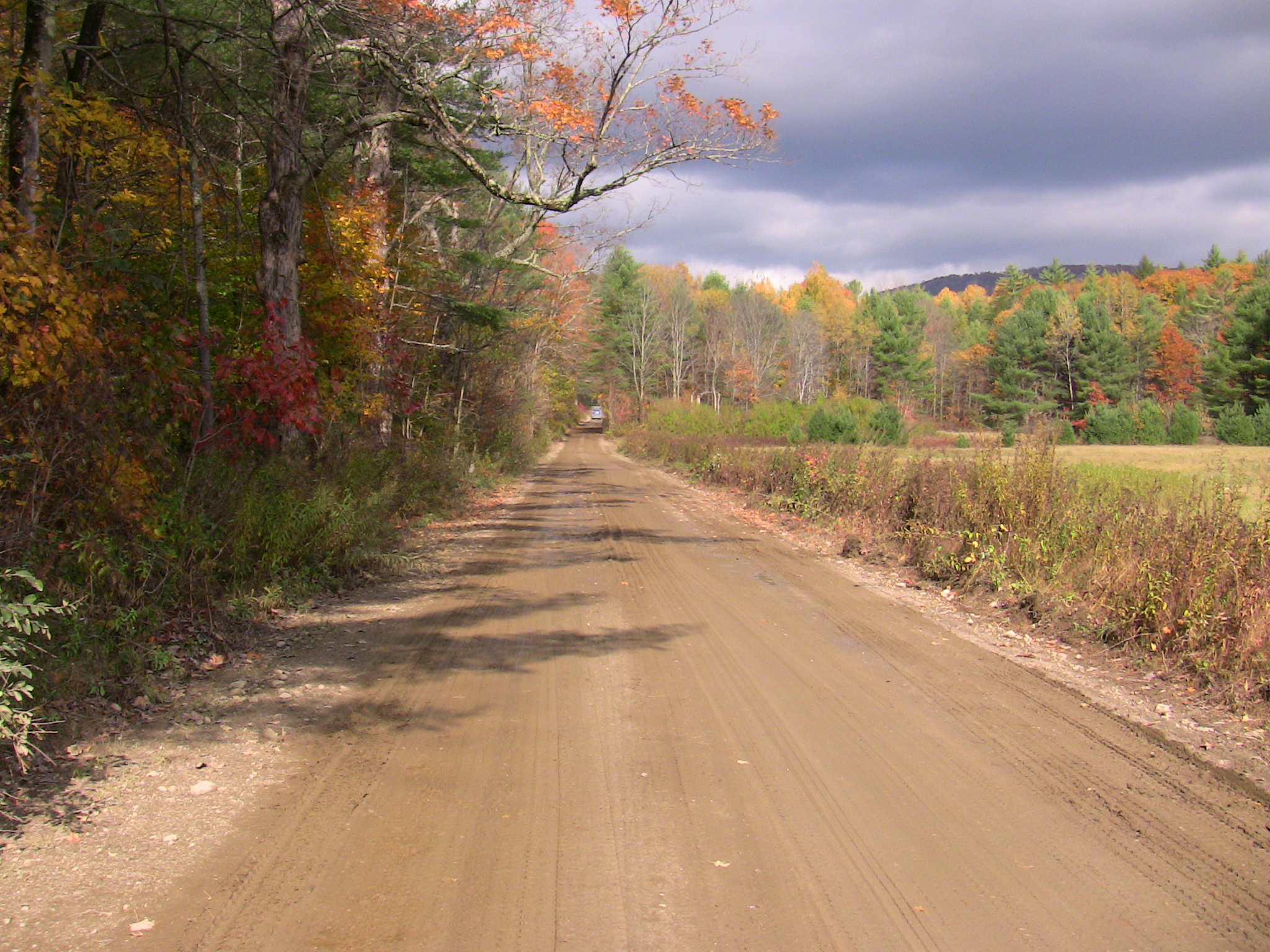
Crown Point Road (now Branch Brook Road) near Weathersfield, Vermont

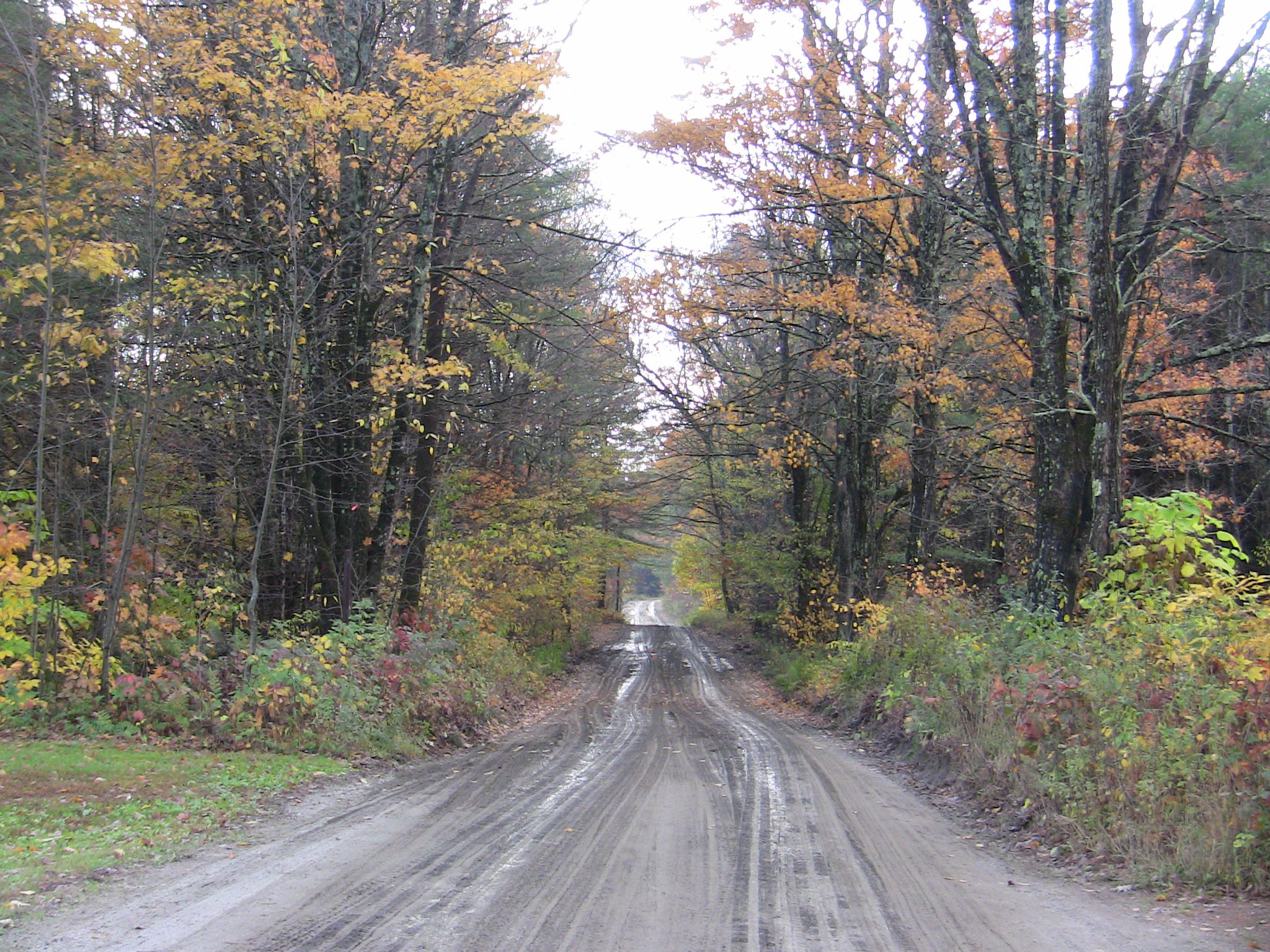
Crown Point Road (now Branch Brook Road) near Weathersfield, Vermont

== See also ==
- National Register of Historic Places listings in Windsor County, Vermont
