= Brandon (CDP), Vermont =

Census-designated place in Vermont, United States

Brandon, Vermont
- Census-designated place
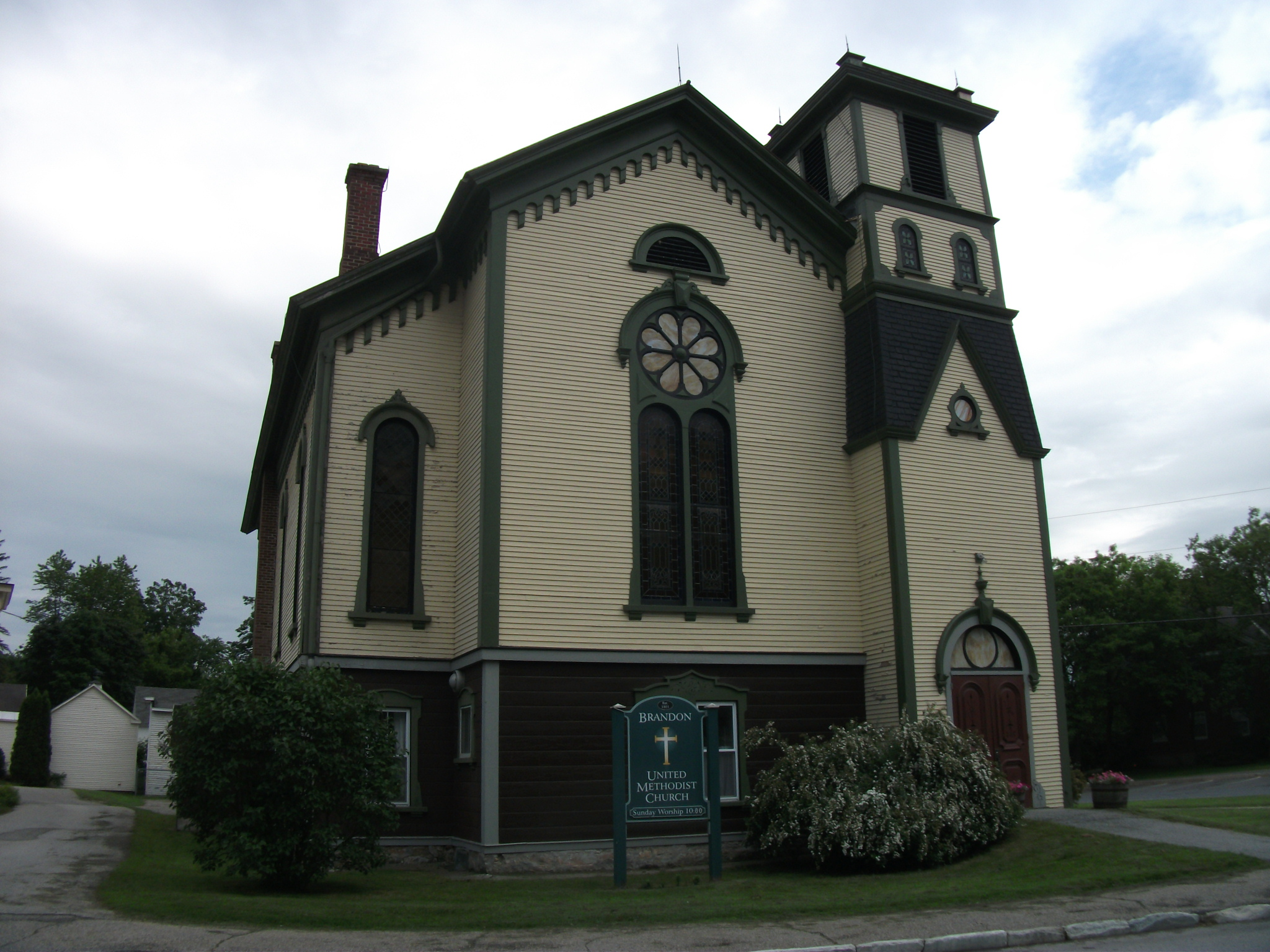
- Church in Brandon
- Interactive map of Brandon, Vermont
- Coordinates: 43°48′04″N 73°05′03″W
- Country: United States
- State: Vermont
- County: Rutland

Area
  - Total: 2.9 sq mi (7.4 km^{2})
  - Land: 2.9 sq mi (7.4 km^{2})
  - Water: 0 sq mi (0.0 km^{2})
- Elevation: 499 ft (152 m)

Population (2020)
  - Total: 1,727
  - Density: 600/sq mi (230/km^{2})
- Time zone: UTC-5 (Eastern (EST))
  - Summer (DST): UTC-4 (EDT)
- ZIP Code: 05733
- Area code: 802
- FIPS code: 50-07675
- GNIS feature ID: 2378122

- Brandon Village Historic District
- U.S. National Register of Historic Places
- U.S. Historic district
- Location within Vermont Location within the United States
- Location: U.S. 7, Brandon, Vermont
- Coordinates: 43°47′52″N 73°5′18″W
- Area: 300 acres (120 ha)
- Architect: multiple
- Architectural style: Mid 19th Century Revival, Federal, Late Victorian
- NRHP reference No.: 76000145
- Added to NRHP: December 22, 1976

Brandon is an unincorporated village and census-designated place (CDP) in the town of Brandon, Rutland County, Vermont, United States. As of the 2020 census, the population was 1,727.

Most of the village is listed on the National Register of Historic Places as the Brandon Village Historic District.

== History ==
In 1976, approximately 300 acres (120 ha) along U.S. Route 7 in Brandon and its vicinity were listed as a historic district on the National Register of Historic Places. The district includes nearly 250 buildings significant for their history and their architecture.

== Geography ==
Brandon is located at 43°47′53″N 73°5′11″W (43.798056, 73.086389).

According to the United States Census Bureau, the CDP has a total area of 7.4 km^{2} (2.9 sq mi), all land.

== Demographics ==
As of the census of 2000, there were 1,684 people, 718 households, and 463 families residing in the CDP. The population density was 228.1 people/km^{2} (591 people/mi^{2}). There were 781 housing units at an average density of 105.8 units/km^{2} (274 units/mi^{2}). The racial makeup of the CDP was 98.46% White, 0.06% Black or African American, 0.24% Native American, 0.12% Asian, and 1.13% from two or more races. Hispanic or Latino of any race were 0.18% of the population.

There were 718 households, out of which 28.8% had children under the age of 18 living with them, 49.9% were married couples living together, 12.4% had a female householder with no husband present, and 35.5% were non-families. 29.7% of all households were made up of individuals, and 15.5% had someone living alone who was 65 years of age or older. The average household size was 2.35 and the average family size was 2.86.

In the CDP, the population was spread out, with 23.8% under the age of 18, 5.6% from 18 to 24, 27.6% from 25 to 44, 27.1% from 45 to 64, and 16.0% who were 65 years of age or older. The median age was 41 years. For every 100 females, there were 83.6 males. For every 100 females age 18 and over, there were 82.0 males.

The median income for a household in the CDP was $34,609, and the median income for a family was $44,514. Males had a median income of $28,382 versus $22,159 for females. The per capita income for the CDP was $23,705. About 6.8% of families and 12.4% of the population were below the poverty line, including 15.7% of those under age 18 and 17.0% of those age 65 or over.

== Notable person ==
- Stephen A. Douglas, U.S. Senator from Illinois
