= John Robinson (US Marshal) =

U.S. Marshal for Vermont

United States Marshal for the District of Vermont
- In office June 24, 1886 – June 18, 1890
- Preceded by: William W. Henry
- Succeeded by: Rollin Amsden

Sheriff of Bennington County, Vermont
- In office 1890–1892
- Preceded by: Andrew J. Pike
- Succeeded by: Henry S. Wilson
- In office 1882–1884
- Preceded by: Jasper Viall
- Succeeded by: James McCall

Personal details
- Born: May 8, 1838 County Meath, Ireland
- Died: April 28, 1917 (aged 78) Bennington, Vermont, U.S.
- Resting place: Park Lawn Cemetery, Bennington, Vermont
- Party: Democratic
- Spouse: Margaret Erwin (m. 1864-1917, his death)
- Children: 1
- Occupation: Businessman; Farmer; Government official

John Robinson (May 8, 1838 – April 28, 1917) was a farmer, businessman, and politician from Vermont. A Democrat, he served as Sheriff of Bennington County and United States Marshal for the District of Vermont.

== Early life ==
John Robinson was born in County Meath, Ireland on May 8, 1838, a son of Thomas Robinson and Mary (Flood) Robinson. His family immigrated to the United States in 1839, and Robinson was raised and educated in Shaftsbury and Bennington.

== Career ==
Robinson became a farmer, worked as a foreman for the Henry Burden & Sons iron ore mines, and settled in Bennington. Over time, Robinson's farm grew to over 400 acres, and he raised sheep, cattle, and horses. In addition to farming, Robinson was an auctioneer and wool broker. He also speculated in real estate and served on the Savings Bank of Bennington's board of trustees.

A Democrat during an era when Vermont's politics were dominated by Republicans, Robinson served in several elective offices despite his party affiliation, including town selectman and justice of the peace. He was Bennington's first constable and tax collector from 1872 to 1885, and a deputy sheriff of Bennington County from 1878 to 1882. From 1882 to 1884, Robinson served as Bennington County Sheriff.

Democrat Grover Cleveland assumed the presidency in 1885, and in 1886 he appointed Robinson US Marshal for the District of Vermont. Cleveland lost his 1888 bid for reelection and Republican Benjamin Harrison became president in 1889. In 1890, Harrison appointed Rollin Amsden to succeed Robinson as marshal. Later that year, Robinson was again elected sheriff, and he served until 1892.

Cleveland returned to the presidency in 1893, and in 1894 he appointed Robinson to serve as Bennington's postmaster. Republican William McKinley became president in 1897, and appointed Arthur J. Dewey to succeed Robinson.

Robinson maintained his interest in politics, including accepting Democratic nominations for various offices. In 1904 and 1905, he was an unsuccessful candidate for town trustee of public money. In 1905 he was also an unsuccessful candidate for school board member. In March 1910, he was an unsuccessful candidate for town selectman. In September 1910, he was an unsuccessful candidate for assistant judge. In 1913, he was again an unsuccessful candidate for town trustee of public money.

== Personal life ==
In 1864, Robinson married Margaret Erwin (d. 1923). They were the parents of an adopted daughter, Elizabeth (1877–1964). Robinson was a member of several fraternal organizations, including the Elks and the Improved Order of Red Men.

Robinson died at his home in Bennington on April 28, 1917. He was buried at Park Lawn Cemetery in Bennington. The cemetery was created on land that Robinson had once owned and he was the first president of the corporation formed to found and operate it.

== Sources ==
=== Newspapers ===
- "Benjamin Harrison is President". Burlington Free Press. Burlington, VT. March 5, 1889. p. 4 – via Newspapers.com.
- "Vermont News Items: Rollin Amsden". Argus and Patriot. Montpelier, VT. July 2, 1890. p. 2 – via Newspapers.com.
- "New Vermont Postmasters". Rutland Herald. Rutland, VT. April 6, 1894. p. 1 – via Newspapers.com.
- "State Notes: Arthur J. Dewey". Londonderry Sifter. Londonderry, VT. March 26, 1897. p. 2 – via Newspapers.com.
- "Democrats Formally Organize and Make Plans for State Campaign". Barre Evening Telegram. Barre, VT. July 26, 1900. p. 1 – via Newspapers.com.
- "Republican Victory". Bennington Banner. Bennington, VT. March 2, 1904. p. 1 – via Newspapers.com.
- "Result of Town Vote". Bennington Banner. Bennington, VT. March 8, 1905. p. 1 – via Newspapers.com.
- "Cromack Elected Selectman". Bennington Banner. Bennington, VT. March 2, 1910. p. 1 – via Newspapers.com.
- "The County Vote". Bennington Banner. Bennington, VT. September 7, 1910. p. 1 – via Newspapers.com.
- "Republicans Win Most Places on Ticket". Bennington Banner. Bennington, VT. March 5, 1913. p. 1 – via Newspapers.com.
- "Park Lawn Cemetery Annual Meeting". Bennington Banner. Bennington, VT. January 21, 1914. p. 1 – via Newspapers.com.
- "Twice Appointed by President Cleveland: John Robinson, Who Died at Home Here Saturday Afternoon". Bennington Banner. Bennington, VT. April 30, 1917. p. 1 – via Newspapers.com.
- "Mrs. Louis M. Haussler". Rutland Herald. Rutland, VT. July 8, 1964. p. 6 – via Newspapers.com.

=== Internet ===
- "Historical Listing of Sheriffs". Vermont Sheriff's Departments: Bennington County. Bennington, VT: Vermont Sheriffs' Association.

=== Books ===
- Porter, Charles W., Vermont Secretary of State (1888). Vermont Legislative Directory. Rutland, VT: The Tuttle Company. p. 338 – via Google Books.
- Carleton, Hiram (1903). Genealogical and Family History of the State of Vermont. New York, NY: Lewis Publishing Company. pp. 519–520 – via HathiTrust.
