= Brandon, Vermont =

- Town
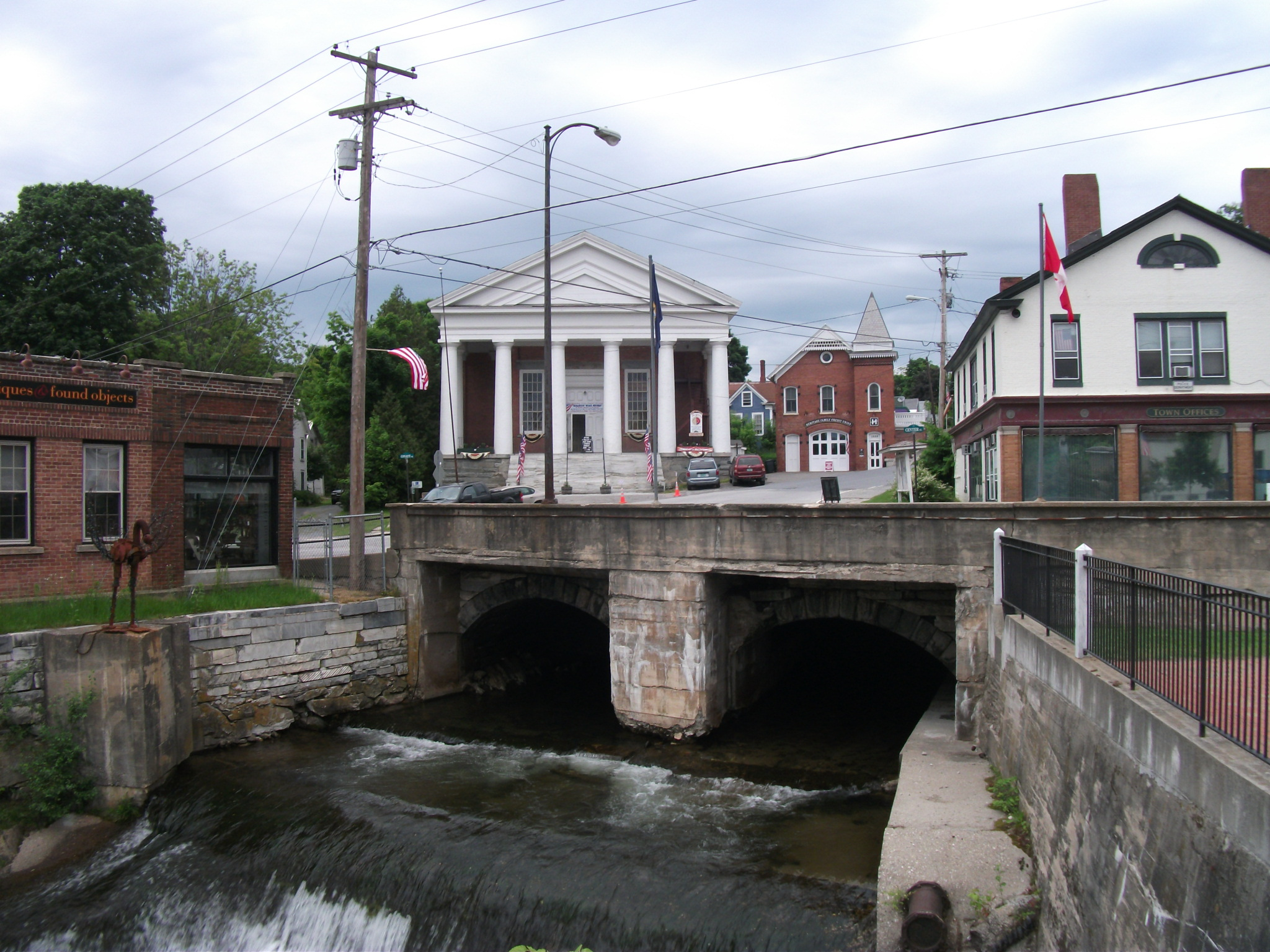
- Downtown Brandon

- Logo

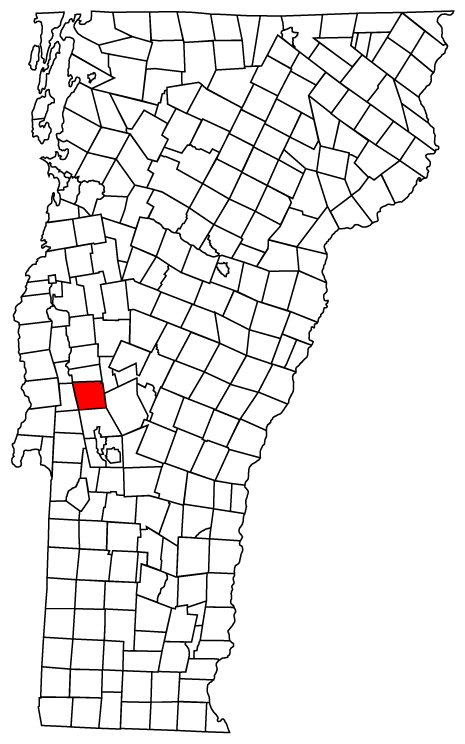
- Brandon, Vermont
- Coordinates: 43°48′15″N 73°06′25″W
- Country: United States
- State: Vermont
- County: Rutland
- Chartered: October 20, 1761
- Name changed from Neshobe: October 20, 1784
- Communities: Brandon; Forest Dale

Government
  - Type: Selectboard - Town Manager government

Area
  - Total: 40.2 sq mi (104.0 km^{2})
  - Land: 40.1 sq mi (103.9 km^{2})
  - Water: 0.039 sq mi (0.1 km^{2})
- Elevation: 443 ft (135 m)

Population (2020)
  - Total: 4,129
  - Density: 102.9/sq mi (39.74/km^{2})
- Time zone: UTC-5 (Eastern (EST))
  - Summer (DST): UTC-4 (EDT)
- ZIP code: 05733 (Brandon); 05745 (Forest Dale)
- Area code: 802
- GNIS feature ID: 1462048
- Website: www.brandonvermont.gov

Brandon is a town in Rutland County, Vermont, United States. As of the 2020 census, the population was 4,129.

== History ==
On October 20, 1761, the town of Neshobe was chartered to Capt. Josiah Powers. In October 1784, the name of the town was changed to Brandon by an act of the legislature.

Brandon is a study in early American architecture and Vermont history. When the first settlers came to the area in the mid-1770s, they established the village of Neshobe. The area was rich in natural resources with excellent farmland along the rivers and abundant supplies of timber and minerals. The town flourished during the 1800s with several industries relying on the key resources of waterpower, iron ore and marble. The coming of the railroad in 1849 enabled the manufacture and shipping of iron-based products such as the Howe scale, as well as Brandon paints, wood products and marble.

During its century of rapid growth, Brandon Village evolved a unique village plan. The historic Crown Point military road came through Brandon to connect Lake Champlain to the Atlantic coast. In the ensuing decades, government and individuals developed commercial streets at the core which radiated out from the greens lined with residences leading to farms, mines and quarries in the town. Pearl and Park streets were laid out to be suitable for militia training, resulting in broad, tree-shaded streets with deep front yards.

Statesman Stephen A. Douglas was born in Brandon, and his birthplace is now the Brandon Museum as well as the town's Visitor Center. Douglas returned in 1860 to inform a crowd that Brandon was a good place to be born and leave.

Thomas Davenport, proclaimed by some to have invented the electric motor, was born and lived in Brandon.

As the early industries began to decline, dairying, stock breeding and tourism became increasingly important and ensured the economic survival of Brandon in the 20th century. The establishment of the Brandon Training School in 1915 was a significant event, providing many employment opportunities for area residents. At its height, the Training School served over 600 Vermont residents. Changes in policy and social service practices led to closing the facility in November 1993. The campus, now called Park Village, is used for a variety of purposes including residential, industrial, and institutional uses.

Brandon's historic downtown, with its entire core of 243 buildings, is listed on the National Register of Historic Places.

== Geography ==
According to the United States Census Bureau, the town of Brandon has a total area of 40.2 square miles (104 km^{2}), of which 40.1 square miles (104 km^{2}) is land and 0.1 square miles (0.26 km^{2}), or 0.12%, is water.

== Demographics ==
Historical population
Census	Pop.	Note	%±
1790	637		—
1800	1,076		68.9%
1810	1,375		27.8%
1820	1,495		8.7%
1830	1,946		30.2%
1840	2,194		12.7%
1850	2,835		29.2%
1860	3,077		8.5%
1870	3,571		16.1%
1880	3,280		−8.1%
1890	3,310		0.9%
1900	2,759		−16.6%
1910	2,712		−1.7%
1920	2,874		6.0%
1930	2,891		0.6%
1940	2,979		3.0%
1950	3,304		10.9%
1960	3,329		0.8%
1970	3,697		11.1%
1980	4,194		13.4%
1990	4,223		0.7%
2000	3,917		−7.2%
2010	3,966		1.3%
2020	4,129		4.1%
U.S. Decennial Census

As of the census of 2000, there were 3,917 people, 1,572 households, and 1,097 families residing in the town. The population density was 97.6 people per square mile (37.7/km^{2}). There were 1,710 housing units at an average density of 42.6 per square mile (16.5/km^{2}). The racial makeup of the town was 98.85% White, 0.10% Black or African American, 0.18% Native American, 0.15% Asian, and 0.71% from two or more races. Hispanic or Latino of any race were 0.20% of the population.

There were 1,572 households, out of which 31.7% had children under the age of 18 living with them, 55.9% were married couples living together, 11.1% had a female householder with no husband present, and 30.2% were non-families. 23.6% of all households were made up of individuals, and 11.3% had someone living alone who was 65 years of age or older. The average household size was 2.49 and the average family size was 2.91.

In the town, the population was spread out, with 24.7% under the age of 18, 6.2% from 18 to 24, 28.8% from 25 to 44, 26.7% from 45 to 64, and 13.7% who were 65 years of age or older. The median age was 39 years. For every 100 females, there were 90.2 males. For every 100 females age 18 and over, there were 88.0 males.

The median income for a household in the town was $35,810, and the median income for a family was $42,455. Males had a median income of $27,949 versus $22,576 for females. The per capita income for the town was $20,516. About 7.3% of families and 11.2% of the population were below the poverty line, including 13.9% of those under age 18 and 10.0% of those age 65 or over.

== Education ==
Brandon is home to Neshobe Elementary school (Pre-K to 6) and Otter Valley Union High School (7–12).

Before the Union High School was constructed, local students attended Brandon High School. Brandon High School was built in 1916 but the school had been in operation since the 19th century. Brandon High School closed in 1961 when Otter Valley Union High School opened. The time that Brandon High School closed was during a wave of consolidation that swept rural areas during the second half of the 20th century. There have since been efforts to convert the old school building into apartments or condominiums.

== Infrastructure ==
Beginning in the spring of 2017, a project named "Segment 6" was initiated, promising "improved streetscape, new traffic pattern, buried wires, better parking, beautiful parks, modern and safe downtown sidewalks, benches, decorative streetlights, and a 21st century underbelly."

== Notable people ==
- John S. Buttles, Associate Justice of the Vermont Supreme Court
- Frank Morse Button, landscape architect
- Paul Dame, chair of the Vermont Republican party
- Charles A. Dana, (Burial Site) founder of Dana Foundation and Dana Corporation
- Thomas Davenport, inventor
- Stephen A. Douglas, statesman
- Fred A. Field, US Marshal for Vermont
- Henry F. Field, Vermont State Treasurer
- Jason Gibbs, former Vermont Commissioner of Forest, Parks and Recreation
- Robert Pratt, former mayor of Minneapolis
- John G. Sawyer, former US Congressman
- Walter F. Scott, Vermont State Treasurer
- Loren B. Sessions, former US Congressman
- Walter L. Sessions, former US Congressman
- Moses N. Wisewell, Union officer
