= List of female state attorneys general in the United States =

The following is a list of female attorneys general of states in the United States. Since 1959, there have been 34 states which have appointed or elected women as attorneys-general. Puerto Rico has had a record four women hold office as attorney general, the most of any U.S. state or territory. Anne X. Alpern of Pennsylvania is the first woman to hold office as the attorney-general of a state.

== List of female attorneys general of states ==
| Officeholder | State | Party | Assumed office | Left office | Law school |
|---|---|---|---|---|---|
| Anne X. Alpern | Pennsylvania | Democratic | January 20, 1959 | August 28, 1961 | University of Pittsburgh |
| Arlene Violet | Rhode Island | Republican | 1985 | 1987 | Boston College |
| Corinne Watanabe | Hawaii | Democratic | 1985 | 1986 | Baylor University |
| Grace Berg Schaible | Alaska | Democratic | 1987 | 1989 | Yale University |
| Mary Sue Terry | Virginia | Democratic | January 11, 1986 | January 28, 1993 | University of Virginia |
| Clarine Nardi Riddle | Connecticut | Democratic | January 3, 1989 | January 9, 1991 | Indiana University |
| Mary Stallcup | Arkansas | Democratic | December 9, 1990 | January 13, 1991 | |
| Gale Norton | Colorado | Republican | January 8, 1991 | January 12, 1999 | University of Denver |
| Frankie Sue Del Papa | Nevada | Democratic | January 7, 1991 | January 6, 2003 | George Washington University |
| Bonnie Campbell | Iowa | Democratic | January 11, 1991 | January 6, 1995 | Drake University |
| Susan B. Loving | Oklahoma | Democratic | June 22, 1991 | January 9, 1995 | University of Oklahoma |
| Heidi Heitkamp | North Dakota | Democratic-NPL | December 15, 1992 | December 15, 2000 | Lewis & Clark College |
| Jan Graham | Utah | Democratic | January 1993 | January 2001 | University of Utah |
| Pamela Carter | Indiana | Democratic | January 13, 1993 | January 16, 1997 | Indiana University |
| Christine Gregoire | Washington | Democratic | January 13, 1993 | January 12, 2005 | Gonzaga University |
| Margery Bronster | Hawaii | Democratic | January 3, 1995 | January 3, 1999 | Columbia University |
| Carla Stovall | Kansas | Republican | January 9, 1995 | January 13, 2003 | University of Kansas |
| Deborah Poritz | New Jersey | Democratic | January 18, 1994 | July 10, 1996 | Harvard University |
| M. Jane Brady | Delaware | Republican | January 3, 1995 | December 7, 2005 | Villanova University |
| Betty Montgomery | Ohio | Republican | January 6, 1995 | January 5, 2003 | University of Toledo |
| Gay Woodhouse | Wyoming | Republican | January 11, 1999 | June 3, 2001 | University of Wyoming |
| Jennifer Granholm | Michigan | Democratic | January 1, 1999 | January 1, 2003 | Harvard University |
| Patricia A. Madrid | New Mexico | Democratic | January 1, 1999 | January 1, 2007 | University of New Mexico |
| Janet Napolitano | Arizona | Democratic | January 4, 1999 | January 6, 2003 | University of Virginia |
| Peg Lautenschlager | Wisconsin | Democratic | January 3, 2003 | January 3, 2007 | University of Wisconsin |
| Lisa Madigan | Illinois | Democratic | January 13, 2003 | January 14, 2019 | Loyola University Chicago |
| Kelly Ayotte | New Hampshire | Republican | June 15, 2004 | July 17, 2009 | Villanova University |
| Judith Jagdmann | Virginia | Republican | January 1, 2005 | January 14, 2006 | University of Richmond |
| Catherine Cortez Masto | Nevada | Democratic | January 1, 2007 | January 5, 2015 | Gonzaga University |
| Lori Swanson | Minnesota | Democratic (DFL) | January 2, 2007 | January 2, 2019 | William Mitchell College |
| Martha Coakley | Massachusetts | Democratic | January 17, 2007 | January 21, 2015 | Boston University |
| Nancy H. Rogers | Ohio | Democratic | May 28, 2008 | January 8, 2009 | Yale University |
| Paula Dow | New Jersey | Democratic | January 18, 2010 | January 10, 2012 | University of Pennsylvania |
| Kamala Harris | California | Democratic | January 3, 2011 | January 3, 2017 | University of California, Hastings |
| Pam Bondi | Florida | Republican | January 4, 2011 | January 9, 2019 | Stetson University |
| Janet Mills | Maine | Democratic | January 6, 2009; January 7, 2013 | January 6, 2011; January 2, 2019 (Note: Mills served one term as Attorney General, from 2009 to 2011, before being replaced by Republican William Schneider as the Maine Republican Party took unified control of the State Legislature and Governorship. Mills returned to the Attorney General position in 2013 after Democrats retook the State Legislature.) | University of Maine, Portland |
| Linda L. Kelly | Pennsylvania | Republican | May 27, 2011 | January 15, 2013 | Duquesne University |
| Ellen Rosenblum | Oregon | Democratic | June 29, 2012 | December 31, 2024 | University of Oregon |
| Kathleen Kane | Pennsylvania | Democratic | January 15, 2013 | August 17, 2016 | Temple University |
| Cynthia Coffman | Colorado | Republican | January 11, 2015 | January 8, 2019 | Georgia State University |
| Leslie Rutledge | Arkansas | Republican | January 13, 2015 | January 10, 2023 | University of Arkansas, Little Rock |
| Maura Healey | Massachusetts | Democratic | January 21, 2015 | January 5, 2023 | Northeastern University |
| Jahna Lindemuth | Alaska | Independent | August 8, 2016 | December 5, 2018 | University of California, Berkeley |
| Barbara Underwood | New York | Democratic | May 22, 2018 | December 31, 2018 | Georgetown University |
| Letitia James | New York | Democratic | January 1, 2019 | | Howard University |
| Dana Nessel | Michigan | Democratic | January 1, 2019 | | Wayne State University |
| Kathy Jennings | Delaware | Democratic | January 2, 2019 | | Villanova University |
| Clare E. Connors | Hawaii | Democratic | January 3, 2019 | December 10, 2021 | Harvard University |
| Ashley Moody | Florida | Republican | January 9, 2019 | January 21, 2025 | University of Florida |
| Bridget Hill | Wyoming | Republican | March 15, 2019 | May 28, 2025 | University of Wyoming |
| Lynn Fitch | Mississippi | Republican | January 14, 2020 | | University of Mississippi |
| Holly Shikada | Hawaii | Democratic | December 10, 2021 | December 5, 2022 | William S. Richardson School of Law |
| Susanne Young | Vermont | Republican | July 5, 2022 | January 5, 2023 | University of Vermont |
| Anne E. Lopez | Hawaii | Democratic | December 5, 2022 | | William S. Richardson School of Law |
| Kris Mayes | Arizona | Democratic | January 2, 2023 | | Arizona State University |
| Charity Clark | Vermont | Democratic | January 5, 2023 | | Boston College |
| Michelle Henry | Pennsylvania | Democratic | January 17, 2023 | January 21, 2025 | Widener Law Commonwealth |
| Andrea Campbell | Massachusetts | Democratic | January 18, 2023 | | University of California, Los Angeles |
| Angela Colmenero | Texas | Republican | July 10, 2023 | September 16, 2023 | Notre Dame Law School |
| Liz Murrill | Louisiana | Republican | January 8, 2024 | | Pepperdine University School of Law |
| Catherine Hanaway | Missouri | Republican | September 8, 2025 | | Catholic University of America |
| Jennifer Davenport | New Jersey | Democratic | January 20, 2026 | | Seton Hall University School of Law |
| Nicole Cannizzaro | Nevada | Democratic | January 4, 2027 | | William S. Boyd School of Law |

== Female territorial attorneys general ==
| Officeholder | State | Party | Assumed office | Left office | Law school |
|---|---|---|---|---|---|
| Judith W. Rogers | District of Columbia | Democratic | April 12, 1979 | 1983 | Harvard University, University of Virginia |
| J'Ada Finch-Sheen | U.S. Virgin Islands | Democratic | 1982 | 1984 | Howard University School of Law |
| Inez Smith Reid | District of Columbia | Democratic | 1983 | 1986 | Yale University, University of Virginia |
| Elizabeth Barrett-Anderson | Guam | Republican | July 7, 1987 | July 4, 1994 | Santa Clara University |
| Vanessa Ruiz | District of Columbia | Democratic | 1994 | October 1994 | Georgetown University |
| Anabelle Rodríguez | Puerto Rico | Popular Democratic | January 2, 2001 | August 19, 2004 | University of Puerto Rico, Río Piedras |
| Ramona Villagomez Manglona | Northern Mariana Islands | Independent | November 2002 | May 2003 | University of New Mexico |
| Linda Singer | District of Columbia | Democratic | January 2, 2007 | January 5, 2008 | Harvard University |
| Alicia Limtiaco | Guam | Democratic | January 3, 2007 | June 21, 2010 | University of California, Los Angeles |
| Elizabeth Barrett-Anderson | Guam | Republican | January 5, 2015 | January 7, 2019 | Santa Clara University |
| Wanda Vázquez Garced | Puerto Rico | New Progressive | January 2, 2017 | August 7, 2019 | Interamerican University of Puerto Rico |
| Denise George | U.S. Virgin Islands | Democratic | May 14, 2019 | January 1, 2023 | Howard University School of Law |
| Dennise Longo Quiñones | Puerto Rico | New Progressive | August 18, 2019 | July 7, 2020 | George Washington University Law School |
| Inés Del C. Carrau Martínez | Puerto Rico | New Progressive | July 7, 2020 | January 2, 2021 | Pontifical Catholic University of Puerto Rico |
| Carol Thomas-Jacobs | U.S. Virgin Islands | Democratic | January 1, 2023 | April 14, 2023 | Howard University School of Law |
| Ariel K. Smith | U.S. Virgin Islands | Independent | April 14, 2023 | March 15, 2024 | Rutgers Law School |

== Currently Serving Female Attorneys General ==
| Officeholder | State | Party | Assumed office | Manner of Assuming Office |
|---|---|---|---|---|
| Letitia James | New York | Democratic | January 1, 2019 | Elected in 2018. |
| Dana Nessel | Michigan | Democratic | January 1, 2019 | Elected in 2018. |
| Kathy Jennings | Delaware | Democratic | January 2, 2019 | Elected in 2018. |
| Lynn Fitch | Mississippi | Republican | January 14, 2020 | Elected in 2019. |
| Anne E. Lopez | Hawaii | Democratic | December 5, 2022 | Appointed in 2022 by the Governor. |
| Kris Mayes | Arizona | Democratic | January 2, 2023 | Elected in 2022. |
| Charity Clark | Vermont | Democratic | January 5, 2023 | Elected in 2022. |
| Andrea Campbell | Massachusetts | Democratic | January 18, 2023 | Elected in 2022. |
| Liz Murrill | Louisiana | Republican | January 8, 2024 | Elected in 2023. |
| Catherine Hanaway | Missouri | Republican | September 8, 2025 | Appointed in 2025 by the Governor. |
| Jennifer Davenport | New Jersey | Democratic | January 20, 2026 | Appointed in 2026 by the Governor. |
