= 2026 Vermont Attorney General election =

- November 3, 2026
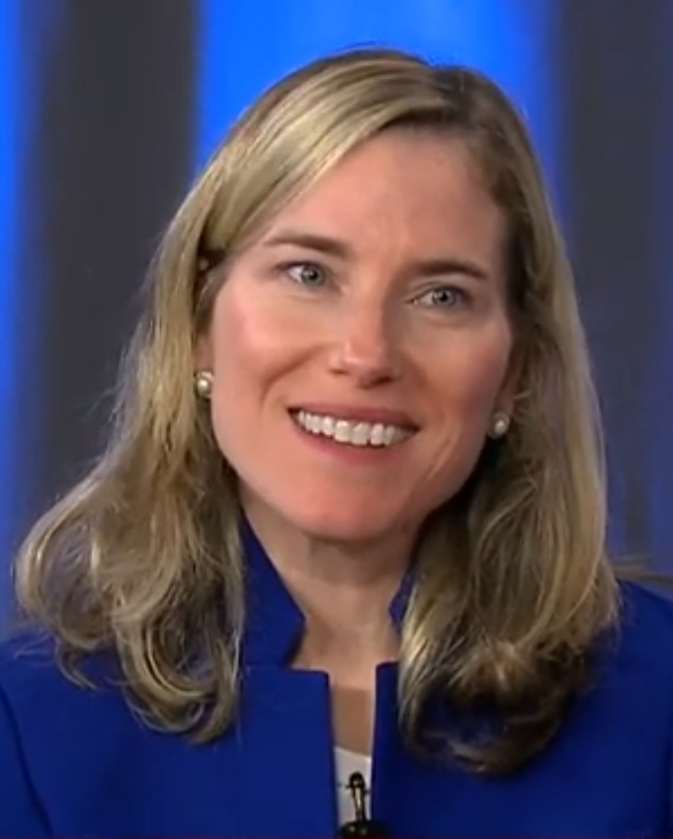

Nominee	Charity Clark	Ed Kemon (replacing H. Brooke Paige)
Party	Democratic	Republican
Popular vote	200,480	94,948
Percentage	67.74%	32.08%
Attorney General before election
Charity Clark
Democratic
Elected Attorney General
Charity Clark
Democratic

The 2026 Vermont Attorney General election was held on November 3, 2026, to elect the Attorney General of Vermont. Primary elections took place on August 11, 2026.

Incumbent Democratic attorney general Charity Clark, who was re-elected in 2024 with 57.8% of the vote, won re-election to a third term in office.

== Democratic primary ==
=== Candidates ===
==== Nominee ====
- Charity Clark, incumbent attorney general

=== Endorsements ===
Charity Clark

Organizations

- Democratic Attorneys General Association
- EMILYs List
- Sierra Club Vermont

=== Results ===
Democratic primary results
Party	Candidate	Votes	%
Democratic	Charity Clark (incumbent)	72,943	99.1
Write-in		651	0.9
Total votes		73,594	100.0

== Republican primary ==
=== Candidates ===
==== Nominee ====
- Ed Kemon, systems engineer

==== Withdrew nomination ====
- H. Brooke Paige, newsstand owner and perennial candidate

=== Results ===
Republican primary results
Party	Candidate	Votes	%
Republican	H. Brooke Paige	16,687	96.6
Write-in		581	3.4
Total votes		17,268	100.0

== General election ==
H. Brooke Paige, who also won the Republican nominations for state Secretary of State, state Treasurer, and state Auditor of Accounts, withdrew from all but the secretary of state race on August 19, in order to allow the Vermont Republican Party to name replacement candidates. The Vermont Republican Party picked Ed Kemon to be the Republican nominee for Attorney General.

=== Results ===
2026 Vermont Attorney General election
Party	Candidate	Votes	%	±%
Democratic	Charity Clark (incumbent)	200,480	67.74	+9.92
Republican	Edwin Kemon	94,948	32.08	−5.02
Write-in		528	0.18	
Total votes		295,956	100.0	
Democratic hold				
