= DeBevoise =

DeBevoise is a surname, probably related to the French city of Beauvais.

== People ==
- Charles I. DeBevoise, (1872-1958), US General
- Dickinson R. Debevoise, (1924-2015), United States District Judge
- Eli Whitney Debevoise, (1899-1990), New York lawyer, founder Debevoise & Plimpton
- Eli Whitney Debevoise II, (1953), former director of the World Bank Group
- Thomas M. Debevoise, (1929-1995), Vermont Attorney General
- William H. DeBevoise, (1826-1886), Union Army officer
- Sean W. DeBevoise, USMC, author "Headshot: Betrayal of a Nation"

== Other ==
- Debevoise & Plimpton, New York City law firm
