= Michael Tagliavia =

American politician

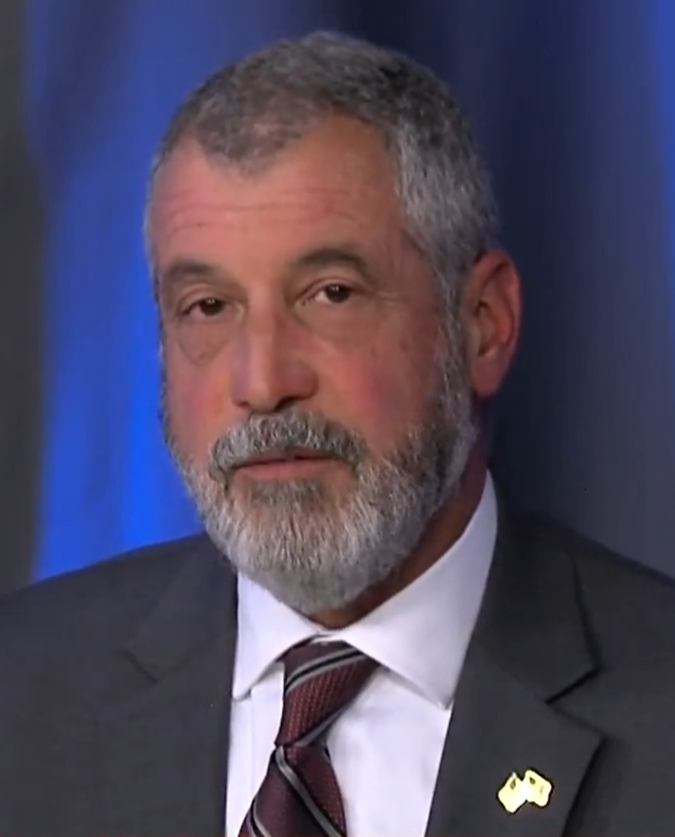
- Tagliavia in 2022

Member of the Vermont House of Representatives from the Orange-1 district
- Incumbent
- Assumed office January 8, 2025
- Preceded by: Carl Demrow

Personal details
- Party: Republican

Michael Tagliavia is an American politician. He serves as a Republican member for the Orange-1 district of the Vermont House of Representatives.

In 2022, Tagliavia ran as a Republican candidate for attorney general of Vermont. He received 95,661 votes, but lost to Democratic challenger Charity Clark, who won with 179,098 votes.
