= Texas v. Pennsylvania =

- Supreme Court of the United States

Decided December 11, 2020
- Full case name: State of Texas v. Commonwealth of Pennsylvania, State of Georgia, State of Michigan, and State of Wisconsin
- Docket no.: 22O155

Holding
- Texas lacks Article III standing to sue other states over how they conduct their own elections. Case dismissed.

Court membership
- Chief Justice John Roberts Associate Justices Clarence Thomas · Stephen Breyer; Samuel Alito · Sonia Sotomayor; Elena Kagan · Neil Gorsuch; Brett Kavanaugh · Amy Coney Barrett

Case opinion
- Per curiam
- Statement: Alito, joined by Thomas

Laws applied
- U.S. Const. art. II, § 1, cl. 2, art. III

Texas v. Pennsylvania, 592 U.S. ___ (2020), was a lawsuit filed at the United States Supreme Court contesting the administration of the 2020 presidential election in four states in which Joe Biden defeated then-incumbent president Donald Trump.

Filed by Texas state attorney general Ken Paxton on December 8, 2020, under the Supreme Court's original jurisdiction, the lawsuit alleged that Georgia, Michigan, Pennsylvania, and Wisconsin violated the United States Constitution by changing election procedures through non-legislative means – thus violating the independent state legislature theory. The suit sought to temporarily withhold the certified vote count from these four states prior to the Electoral College vote on December 14. The suit was filed after over 60 lawsuits arising from disputes over the election results filed by Trump and the Republican Party had failed in numerous state and federal courts.

The suit had been drafted by a team of lawyers with ties to the Trump presidential campaign. Paxton agreed to file the case after other state attorneys general declined to do so. The solicitor general of Texas Kyle D. Hawkins objected to the suit and refused to let his name be added. Paxton hired Lawrence J. Joseph, who had helped draft the suit, as special counsel to assist with the suit.

Within one day of Texas's filing, Trump, over 100 Republican representatives, and 18 Republican state attorneys general filed motions to support the case. Trump referred to this case as "the big one" of the election-challenging lawsuits. Attorneys general for the defendant states, joined in briefs submitted by their counterparts from twenty other states, two territories, and the District of Columbia, urged the Court to refuse the case, with Pennsylvania's brief calling it a "seditious abuse of the judicial process". Legal experts argued that the case was not likely to be heard and not likely to succeed if it was, and that it was thus a "Hail Mary" action.

The Supreme Court issued orders on December 11, dismissing the case on the basis that Texas lacked standing under Article III of the Constitution to challenge the results of the election held by another state.

== Background ==
Several states changed their voting laws prior to the 2020 United States presidential election to make postal voting easier, due to fears that in-person voting would expose people to COVID-19. Legal challenges to the changes were raised across the country. A number of these cases involved voting regulations that were altered by states' executive branches and not by state legislatures. In Texas v. Pennsylvania, Texas claimed that such alterations violated Article Two of the United States Constitution.

The initial tallies of votes, completed within the week of election day, showed that Joe Biden had won sufficient votes in the Electoral College to secure the presidency over incumbent Donald Trump. Trump and the Republican National Committee (RNC) launched many lawsuits against swing states challenging their vote tallies, particularly in states that had voted for Trump in the 2016 United States presidential election but had turned to Biden in 2020, such as Pennsylvania, Michigan, Wisconsin, and Georgia. Most of the cases raised by Trump and the RNC were dismissed on procedural grounds or rejected on substantive grounds in the courts and did not affect the projected Electoral College result. PolitiFact noted that the forces behind reversing the election had by this point "lost dozens of election lawsuits."

Before and after the election, Trump stated his expectation that the Supreme Court would determine the outcome. After the election, his legal team sought to bring a case before the Court, on which conservative justices—including three appointed by Trump—held a 6–3 majority.

== Filings ==
=== Procedure ===
The case was filed on December 8, 2020, directly with the Supreme Court as it holds original jurisdiction over disputes between states. Such cases are infrequent: there were 123 "original jurisdiction" cases from 1789 to 1959. Original jurisdiction cases are immediately docketed pursuant to Rule 17 once the plaintiff submits its motion for leave to file and pays its docket fees. (Note: "Rule 17" refers to Rule 17 of the rules of the Supreme Court of the United States. See "Rules of the Supreme Court of the United States" (PDF). Supreme Court of the United States. July 1, 2019. p. 17.) Because the suit requested expedited consideration, the Court set a deadline at 3:00 p.m. on December 10 for the four defendant states to respond. Whereas a typical case submitted through a writ of certiorari requires only four justices to accept to be certified by the Supreme Court, this case would have required five justices.

=== Texas ===
The suit was filed by Texas attorney general Ken Paxton. It claimed that Georgia, Michigan, Pennsylvania and Wisconsin violated the Constitution by changing their election procedures to limit the spread of COVID-19. The case was filed on the same day as the "safe harbor" threshold, beyond which Congress must accept certified results from states ahead of the Electoral College's official vote on December 14, 2020. The suit alleged that the four states "ignor[ed] statutory requirements as to how [mail-in ballots] were received, evaluated and counted". It further argued that electoral processes in the four defendant states "suffered from significant and unconstitutional irregularities", and therefore that it was not clear who "legitimately won the 2020 election".

In the lawsuit, Texas alleged that the defendant states, by changing their election processes, violated three clauses of the Constitution: the Electors Clause (Article II, Section 1, Clause 2), the Equal Protection Clause, and the Due Process Clause. In particular, it argued the Constitution requires changes to electoral procedures to be made only by state legislatures, and not by executives such as secretaries of state. Accordingly, it argued, changes to election procedures made by executive action, and not by alterations to state law, rendered election results constitutionally infirm.

Texas argued it had standing to sue to prevent its votes from becoming "diluted". Texas instead alleged that "fraud becomes undetectable" because "unlawful actions of election officials effectively destroy the evidence". Whether "voters committed fraud" was not the "constitutional issue" in this case, according to Texas. Therefore, Texas declared that it did not need to "prove" fraud.

Texas sought relief by requesting the Supreme Court block those four states from voting in the electoral college and extend the deadline by which states must submit their certified vote.

Texas, in its December 11 response to the defendant states, stated "Defendant States do not seriously address grave issues that Texas raises, choosing to hide behind other court venues and decisions in which Texas could not participate and to mischaracterize both the relief that Texas seeks and the justification for that relief." In an interview, Paxton further argued that "the only place we can file is the Supreme Court, and we did what we did appropriately, so to call it 'seditious' is really ridiculous." In response to commentators who said the action was a Hail Mary, Paxton said, "Unless you throw the pass, you can't complete it."

=== Amici curiae respondents ===
Plaintiff Texas (TX) Defendants (WI, MI, PA, GA) opposed Texas States with attorneys general filing in support of Texas States with attorneys general filing in support of the Defendant states. The District of Columbia which is a federal district also filed in support as did Guam and the U.S. Virgin Islands, two U.S. Territories. States with attorneys general filing brief in support of neither side State with attorney general filing in support of Texas, but the governor filing in support of the Defendant states.

==== Supporting plaintiff Texas ====
Attorneys general of seventeen additional states filed a joint brief on December 9 supporting Texas.

On the same day, Trump filed a motion to intervene in his personal capacity, thereby attempting to join the case as a plaintiff. Trump's brief was filed by Chapman University School of Law professor John C. Eastman, who in August 2020 authored an article published in Newsweek questioning Kamala Harris's eligibility for the position of vice president. On social media, the president referred to the case as "the big one". Over 120 Republican members of the House of Representatives filed an amicus brief in support of the suit, including leader Kevin McCarthy and his deputy Steve Scalise. 106 members of the House initially signed on to the lawsuit in support of the plaintiff. 20 additional members of the House signed on to the lawsuit in support of the plaintiff before it was dismissed.

Later on December 10, attorneys general of six states that had already responded in an amicus brief, Arkansas, Utah, Louisiana, Missouri, Mississippi and South Carolina, petitioned to the Supreme Court to let them join Texas as a plaintiff in the case. This effort was led by Missouri Attorney General Eric Schmitt.

List of attorneys general supporting Texas
- Lynn Fitch, Mississippi
- Tim Fox, Montana
- Curtis Hill, Indiana
- Mike Hunter, Oklahoma
- Jeff Landry, Louisiana
- Steve Marshall, Alabama
- Ashley Moody, Florida
- Patrick Morrisey, West Virginia
- Doug Peterson, Nebraska
- Jason R. Ravnsborg, South Dakota
- Sean D. Reyes, Utah
- Leslie Rutledge, Arkansas
- Derek Schmidt, Kansas
- Eric Schmitt, Missouri
- Herbert H. Slatery III, Tennessee
- Wayne Stenehjem, North Dakota
- Alan Wilson, South Carolina

First group of Republicans supporting Texas Additional 20 Republicans supporting Texas Republican who did not sign the brief Democrat who did not sign the brief Libertarian seat Vacant seat

List of 126 House of Representative members supporting Texas
- Ralph Abraham, LA-05
- Robert Aderholt, AL-04
- Rick Allen, GA-12
- Jodey Arrington, TX-19
- Brian Babin, TX-36
- Jim Baird, IN-04
- Jim Banks, IN-03
- Jack Bergman, MI-01
- Andy Biggs, AZ-05
- Gus Bilirakis, FL-12
- Dan Bishop, NC-09
- Mike Bost, IL-12
- Kevin Brady, TX-08
- Mo Brooks, AL-05
- Ken Buck, CO-04
- Ted Budd, NC-13
- Tim Burchett, TN-02
- Michael C. Burgess, TX-26
- Bradley Byrne, AL-01
- Ken Calvert, CA-42
- Buddy Carter, GA-01
- Ben Cline, VA-06
- Michael Cloud, TX-27
- Doug Collins, GA-09
- Mike Conaway, TX-11
- Rick Crawford, AR-01
- Dan Crenshaw, TX-02
- Scott DesJarlais, TN-04
- Mario Diaz-Balart, FL-25
- Jeff Duncan, SC-03
- Neal Dunn, FL-02
- Tom Emmer, MN-06
- Ron Estes, KS-04
- Drew Ferguson, GA-03
- Chuck Fleischmann, TN-03
- Bill Flores, TX-17
- Jeff Fortenberry, NE-01
- Virginia Foxx, NC-05
- Russ Fulcher, ID-01
- Matt Gaetz, FL-01
- Greg Gianforte, MT-AL
- Bob Gibbs, OH-07
- Louie Gohmert, TX-01
- Lance Gooden, TX-05
- Sam Graves, MO-06
- Mark Green, TN-07
- Morgan Griffith, VA-09
- Michael Guest, MS-03
- Jim Hagedorn, MN-01
- Andy Harris, MD-01
- Vicky Hartzler, MO-04
- Kevin Hern, OK-01
- Jody Hice, GA-10
- Clay Higgins, LA-03
- Trey Hollingsworth, IN-09
- Richard Hudson, NC-08
- Bill Huizenga, MI-02
- Bill Johnson, OH-06
- Mike Johnson, LA-04
- Jim Jordan, OH-04
- John Joyce, PA-13
- Fred Keller, PA-12
- Mike Kelly, PA-16
- Trent Kelly, MS-01
- Steve King, IA-04
- David Kustoff, TN-08
- Darin LaHood, IL-18
- Doug LaMalfa, CA-01
- Doug Lamborn, CO-05
- Robert E. Latta, OH-05
- Debbie Lesko, AZ-08
- Billy Long, MO-07
- Barry Loudermilk, GA-11
- Blaine Luetkemeyer, MO-03
- Kenny Marchant, TX-24
- Roger Marshall, KS-01
- Kevin McCarthy, CA-23
- Tom McClintock, CA-04
- Cathy McMorris Rodgers, WA-05
- Dan Meuser, PA-09
- Carol Miller, WV-03
- John Moolenaar, MI-04
- Alex Mooney, WV-02
- Markwayne Mullin, OK-02
- Greg Murphy, NC-03
- Dan Newhouse, WA-04
- Ralph Norman, SC-05
- Steven Palazzo, MS-04
- Gary Palmer, AL-06
- Greg Pence, IN-06
- Scott Perry, PA-10
- Bill Posey, FL-08
- Guy Reschenthaler, PA-14
- Tom Rice, SC-07
- Mike Rogers, AL-03
- John Rose, TN-06
- David Rouzer, NC-07
- John Rutherford, FL-04
- Steve Scalise, LA-01
- Austin Scott, GA-08
- Mike Simpson, ID-02
- Adrian Smith, NE-03
- Jason T. Smith, MO-08
- Ross Spano, FL-15
- Pete Stauber, MN-08
- Elise Stefanik, NY-21
- Greg Steube, FL-17
- Glenn Thompson, PA-15
- Tom Tiffany, WI-07
- Jeff Van Drew, NJ-02
- William Timmons, SC-04
- Ann Wagner, MO-02
- Tim Walberg, MI-07
- Mark Walker, NC-06
- Jackie Walorski, IN-02
- Michael Waltz, FL-06
- Randy Weber, TX-14
- Daniel Webster, FL-11
- Brad Wenstrup, OH-02
- Bruce Westerman, AR-04
- Roger Williams, TX-25
- Joe Wilson, SC-02
- Rob Wittman, VA-01
- Ron Wright, TX-06
- Ted Yoho, FL-03
- Lee Zeldin, NY-01

==== Supporting defendant states ====
An amicus curiae brief on the side of the defendants was filed by a group of former Republican office holders and officials.

The defendant states responded on December 10, urging the Court to reject the case. Pennsylvania's reply called the suit a "seditious abuse of the judicial process". The states urged that the justices "send a clear and unmistakable signal that such abuse must never be replicated".

Attorneys general of the District of Columbia, Guam, the Virgin Islands, and 20 states filed a brief in support of the defendant states the same day:

List of attorneys general supporting the defendants
- Hector Balderas, New Mexico
- Xavier Becerra, California
- Leevin Taitano Camacho, Territory of Guam
- Clare E. Connors, Hawaii
- Thomas J. Donovan, Vermont
- Keith Ellison, Minnesota
- Robert W. Ferguson, Washington
- Aaron D. Ford, Nevada
- Aaron M. Frey, Maine
- Brian E. Frosh, Maryland
- Denise George, U.S. Virgin Islands
- Gurbir S. Grewal, New Jersey
- Maura Healey, Massachusetts
- Mark R. Herring, Virginia
- Letitia James, New York
- Kathleen Jennings, Delaware
- Peter F. Neronha, Rhode Island
- Karl Racine, District of Columbia
- Kwame Raoul, Illinois
- Ellen F. Rosenblum, Oregon
- Josh Stein, North Carolina
- William Tong, Connecticut
- Philip J. Weiser, Colorado

==== Supporting both parties ====
Although Montana attorney general Tim Fox participated in the joint brief filed on December 9 supporting Texas, outgoing Montana governor Steve Bullock filed a separate brief on December 10 in support of the defendants.

==== Supporting neither party ====
On December 10, Ohio attorney general Dave Yost filed a motion supporting neither side but stated that "the [s]tates need this Court to decide, at the earliest available opportunity, the question whether the Electors Clause permits state courts (and state executive officials) to alter the rules by which presidential elections are conducted." Yost also stated Ohio could not support Texas's request for relief because Ohio's position is that state legislatures' power over elections should not be overridden by federal courts. Arizona also filed a brief on jurisdiction but supporting neither party.

== Reactions to court filing ==
=== Law ===
The suit was criticized by legal experts and called "outlandish". University of Texas School of Law law professor Stephen I. Vladeck called the suit the "craziest lawsuit filed to purportedly challenge the election". Election law expert Rick Hasen characterized the lawsuit as a "press release masquerading as a lawsuit" and "the dumbest case I've ever seen filed on an emergency basis at the Supreme Court." Edward Foley, director of the election law program at Ohio State University, urged the court to ignore the case and refrain from interfering in the election.

Alan Dershowitz of Harvard Law School described the 11th-hour case a "Hail Mary pass" that was "creative but unlikely to win", because alleging that Texas, instead of its voters, was injured (in order to bypass the Eleventh Amendment to the U.S. Constitution) is "far-fetched"; he also expressed concern that the case was filed too late.

Another Harvard Law professor, Noah Feldman, characterized the lawsuit as a coup attempt by Republicans to overturn the results of the election.

Senator Ted Cruz, who previously served as Solicitor General of Texas and argued several cases before the Court while serving in that capacity, accepted Trump's request to argue the case should the Court hear it.

Legal experts also did not expect the Supreme Court to certify the case, given its reluctance to hear post-election challenges. On the same day as Texas's filing, the Court refused to hear arguments in another post-election challenge, Kelly v. Pennsylvania, without any dissents. The defendants also argued that the legal principle of laches, which may bar an action if it is filed too late, is grounds for dismissing Texas's claim. (Note: Black's Law Dictionary defines laches as, among other things, "a want of activity and diligence in making a claim or moving for the enforcement of a right (particularly in equity) which will afford ground for presuming against it, or for refusing relief, where that is discretionary with the court." See Black, Henry Campbell (1910). Black's Law Dictionary. Saint Paul, Minnesota: West. 692 – via Wikisource. "LACHES. Negligence, consisting in the omission of something which a party might do, and might reasonably be expected to do, towards the vindication or enforcement of his rights. The word is generally the synonym of "remissness", "dilatoriness", "unreasonable or unexcused delay", the opposite of "vigilance", and means a want of activity and diligence in making a claim or moving for the enforcement of a right (particularly in equity) which will afford ground for presuming against it, or for refusing relief, where that is discretionary with the court." [scan ])

=== Politics ===
==== In favor ====
Republican Texas governor Greg Abbott signaled his support for the case, saying the case "tries to accelerate the process, providing certainty and clarity about the entire election process. The United States of America needs that."

President Trump retweeted several tweets that expressed support for the suit. On December 9, he promised to intervene in the suit, and filed a motion to do so the same day, thereby attempting to join the case as a plaintiff. On December 10, he tweeted "the Supreme Court has a chance to save our Country from the greatest Election abuse in the history of the United States." On December 11 he tweeted, "I just want to stop the world from killing itself! ... Now that the Biden Administration will be a scandal plagued mess for years to come, it is much easier for the Supreme Court of the United States to follow the Constitution and do what everybody knows has to be done."

Republican senators David Perdue and Kelly Loeffler, both involved in close runoff races in Georgia, voiced support for the suit. In a tweet, Republican Missouri attorney general Eric Schmitt stated his support for the suit, promising to "lead the effort in support of Texas's #SCOTUS filing today". On Twitter, Republican Arkansas attorney general Leslie Rutledge stated she would legally support the motion. Republican Louisiana attorney general Jeff Landry also supported the complaint.

In response to an email to every Republican member of the House of Representatives from Representative Mike Johnson of Louisiana, 125 Republicans joined him to sign an amicus brief supporting the suit. The number represented a clear majority of the Republican caucus in the House. Politico referred to the large number of GOP House members supporting the suit as "jaw-dropping". Republican members of the Senate, on the other hand, were much less likely to speak in favor of the suit, reflecting their different temperaments and political imperatives.

==== Against ====
The office of Republican Georgia attorney general Chris Carr also criticized the suit and Paxton. On December 8, Carr's spokeswoman said that Paxton was "constitutionally, legally[,] and factually wrong about Georgia". Georgia's deputy secretary of state Jordan Fuchs denounced the suit as "false and irresponsible". Trump warned Carr to not rally other Republican officials in opposition to the suit, and the Republican majority in the Georgia State Senate expressed their approval for the filing.

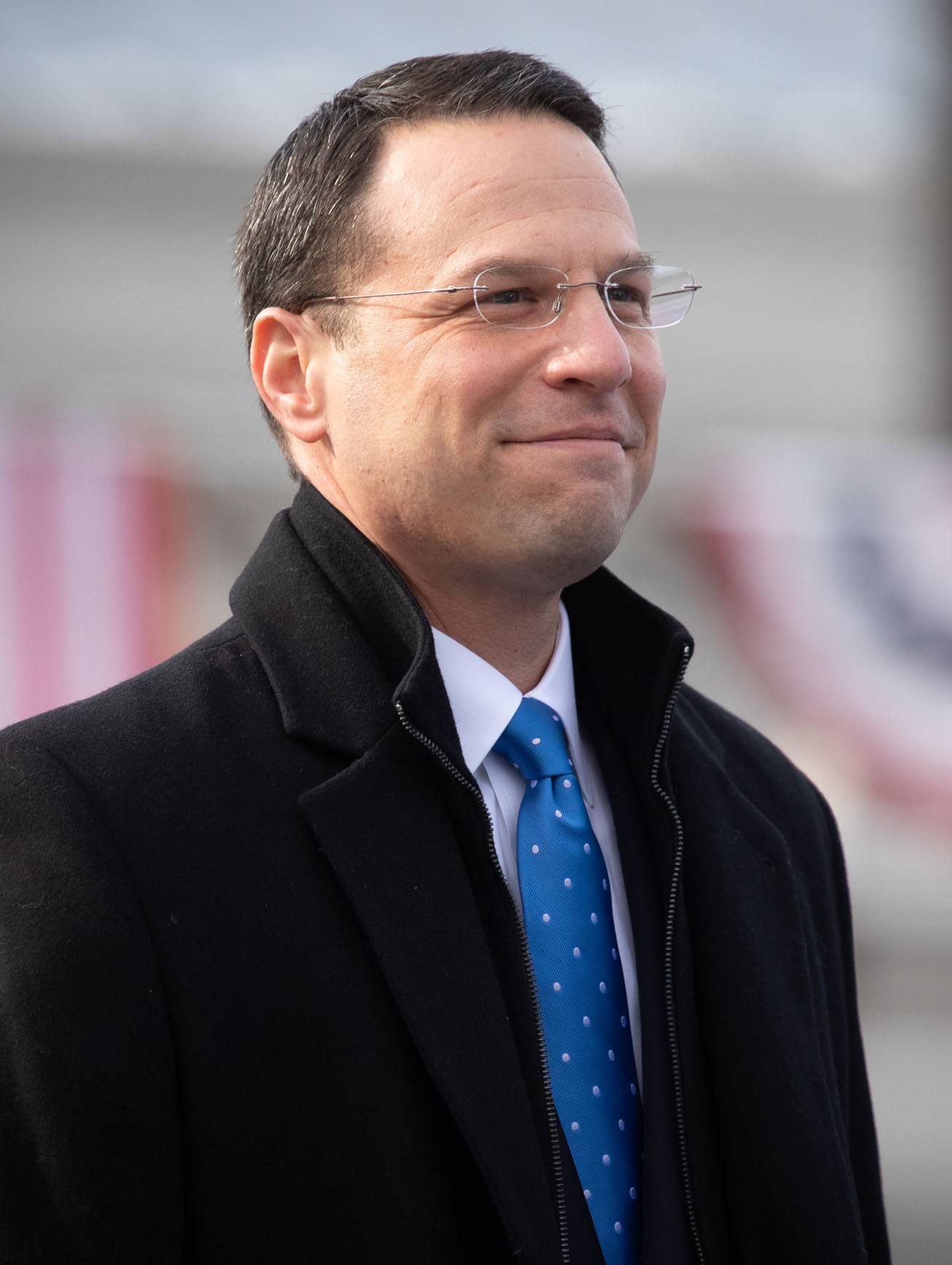
Pennsylvania attorney general Josh Shapiro (pictured in 2019) criticized the suit.

Democratic Michigan attorney general Dana Nessel criticized the suit, labelling it a "publicity stunt ... beneath the dignity" of the Texas attorney general office and saying "[t]he erosion of confidence in our democratic system isn't attributable to the good people of Michigan, Wisconsin, Georgia[,] or Pennsylvania but rather to partisan officials, like Mr. Paxton, who place loyalty to a person over loyalty to their country." Wisconsin Attorney General Josh Kaul called the case "genuinely embarrassing". Pennsylvania attorney general Josh Shapiro stated that "[t]hese continued attacks on our fair and free election system are beyond meritless, beyond reckless—they are a scheme by the President of the United States and some in the Republican party to disregard the will of the people—and name their own victors."

Attorney and Lincoln Project founder George Conway called the lawsuit the "most insane thing yet". Former Federal Elections Commissioner Hans von Spakovsky said, "By almost any measure, this is the legal equivalent of a Hail Mary pass."

Chip Roy, a Republican Texas congressman and former chief of staff to Texas senator Ted Cruz, characterized the suit as "a dangerous violation of federalism [that] sets a precedent to have one state asking federal courts to police the voting procedures of other states". Republican Texas senator and former Texas Supreme Court justice John Cornyn said he was unable "to understand the legal theory" behind the suit.

Emails from Florida attorney general Ashley Moody's office revealed that lawyers in the office ridiculed the lawsuit as "batshit insane" and "weird", and speculated about Paxton's motivations for filing it.

Governor Gary Herbert and Governor-elect Spencer Cox of Utah, both Republicans, denounced Republican Utah state attorney general Sean Reyes's decision to join the amicus brief in support of the lawsuit. Several other states also saw division among Republicans about whether coming out in favor of the suit was wise. The Associated Press wrote that the action "has quickly become a conservative litmus test".

Michael Steele, formerly the chair of the Republican National Committee, called Republican House members' decision to join the suit "an offense to the Constitution" that would "leave[] an indelible stain" on their "political skin". Jeb Bush opined on the suit: "This is crazy. It will be killed on arrival".

Texas solicitor general Kyle Hawkins, who normally would speak on behalf of the state in matters before the Supreme Court, was not listed on the suit.

=== Statistical analysis ===
The lawsuit included a declaration from economist Charles Cicchetti, who claimed that his statistical analysis showed that there was a less than one-in-one-quadrillion chance of Biden's having won any of the states in question. Cicchetti's analysis was widely criticized, since it assumed that voters behaved the same in 2020 as they had in 2016 and because it assumed that vote tallying patterns were random over time. In reality, Biden was a different candidate than Hillary Clinton had been in 2016, and the marked shift of early Republican vote counts to later Democratic votes counts had been anticipated well in advance, because several battleground states had forbidden mail-in ballots from being counted earlier; mail-in ballots favored Biden in part because Trump had long attempted to discredit the reliability of mail-in voting.

Writing at PolitiFact, Eric Litke described the analysis as "wildly illogical", citing professors of political science who described the analysis as "ludicrous" and "statistical incompetence", with one wrong assumption being that "votes are all independently and randomly distributed". At The Volokh Conspiracy, David Post described Cicchetti's analysis as "idiotic" because it was based on two blatantly false assumptions: (1) that voters' preferences had not changed since 2016, and (2) that party preferences did not differ between mail-in and in-person voters. Post stated that Paxton's use of Cicchetti's work was "unethical" because Paxton had not mentioned Cicchetti's key assumptions. At The Washington Post, Philip Bump said that the analysis in the lawsuit was "utterly ridiculous", noting that the 2016 results could not be extrapolated to 2020, because Biden was more popular than Clinton and because voters had become more polarized. Bump also wrote that vote-counting was not "homogeneous", with the "blue shift" phenomenon being entirely expected due to mail-in ballots favoring Biden.

== Outcome ==
On December 11, in an unsigned ruling, the court ruled that Texas lacked standing and denied the suit:

The State of Texas's motion for leave to file a bill of complaint is denied for lack of standing under Article III of the Constitution. Texas has not demonstrated a judicially cognizable interest in the manner in which another State conducts its elections. All other pending motions are dismissed as moot.

Justice Alito, joined by Justice Thomas, disagreed with the ruling denying leave to file a bill of complaint, but did not otherwise find for the plaintiffs. He wrote that the Court is duty-bound to hear the case, referencing Thomas's dissent in Arizona v. California, 589 U. S. ___ (Feb. 24, 2020):

In my view, we do not have discretion to deny the filing of a bill of complaint in a case that falls within our original jurisdiction ... I would therefore grant the motion to file the bill of complaint but would not grant other relief, and I express no view on any other issue.

== Aftermath ==
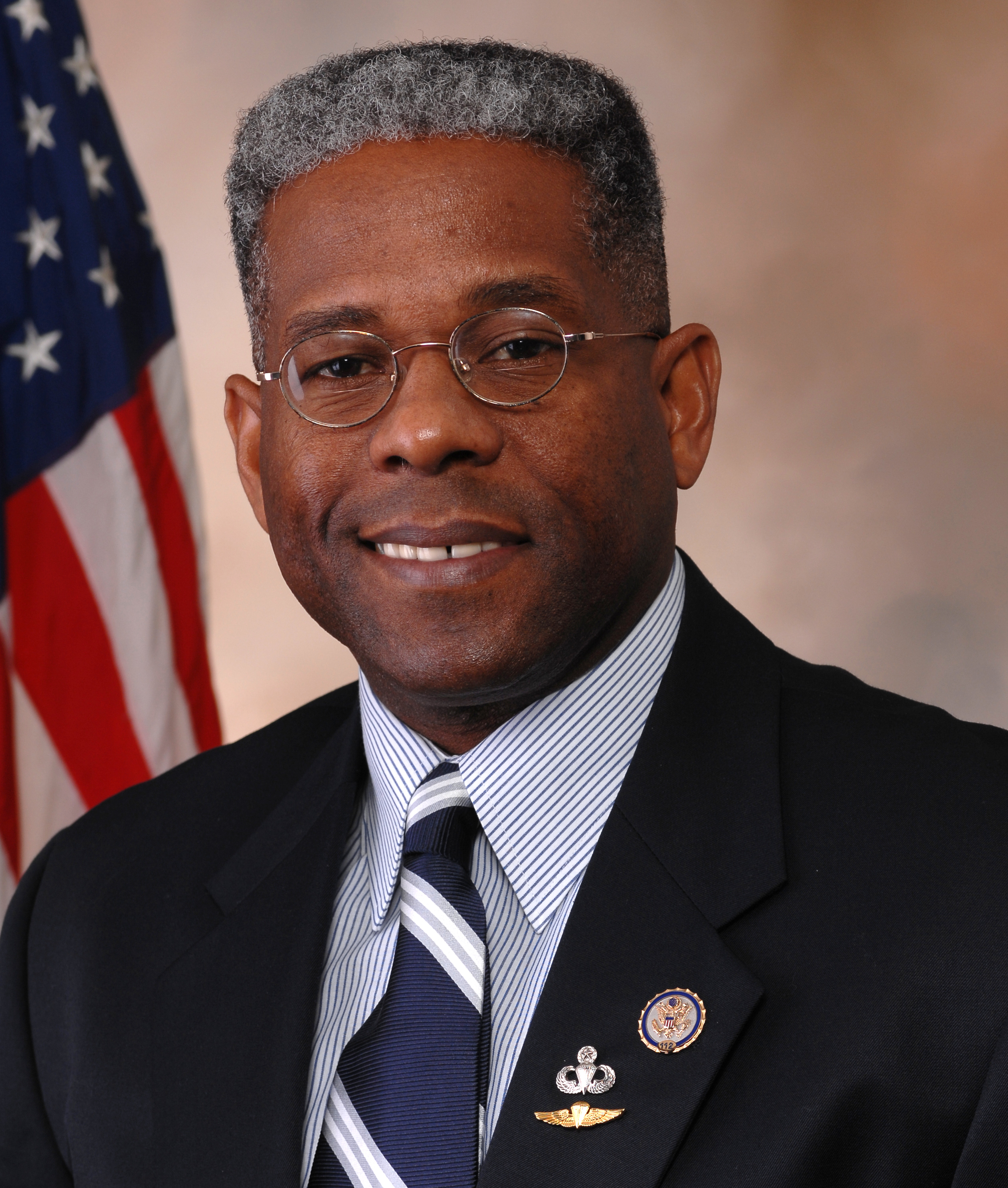
Republican Party of Texas chairman Allen West (pictured in 2011) alluded to secession after the court's decision.

After the Court declined to hear the case, Allen West, then-chairman of the Republican Party of Texas, suggested that "law-abiding states should bond together and form a Union of states that will abide by the constitution". The statement was criticized by Illinois Republican Adam Kinzinger, saying the call for secession was dangerous. The Lincoln Project's George Conway and National Review editor Rich Lowry also criticized West's remarks, stating they were unrepresentative of the "Party of Lincoln".

President Trump harshly criticized the Court's decision, saying "This is a great and disgraceful miscarriage of justice. The people of the United States were cheated, and our Country disgraced. Never even given our day in Court!" White House press secretary Kayleigh McEnany echoed the notion that the case was never given a chance, saying the justices "hid behind procedure ... There's no way to say it other than they dodged." Paxton, for his part, said the decision was "unfortunate".

The Biden campaign said of the ruling: "The Supreme Court has decisively and speedily rejected the latest of Donald Trump and his allies' attacks on the democratic process. This is no surprise—dozens of judges, election officials from both parties, and Trump's own attorney general have dismissed his baseless attempts to deny that he lost the election."

House speaker Nancy Pelosi issued a statement that "The Court has rightly dismissed out of hand the extreme, unlawful and undemocratic GOP lawsuit to overturn the will of millions of American voters" and admonished that "Republicans must once and for all end their election subversion—immediately." Additionally she reprimanded House members who supported the lawsuit: "The 126 Republican Members that signed onto this lawsuit brought dishonor to the House. Instead of upholding their oath to support and defend the Constitution, they chose to subvert the Constitution and undermine public trust in our sacred democratic institutions."

New Jersey representative Bill Pascrell, citing section three of the 14th Amendment, called for Pelosi to not seat Republicans who signed the amicus curiae brief supporting the suit. This proposal would have applied to nearly two-thirds of the Republican representatives of the incoming 117th United States Congress. Pascrell stated, "The text of the 14th Amendment expressly forbids Members of Congress from engaging in rebellion against the United States. Trying to overturn a democratic election and install a dictator seems like a pretty clear example of that."

== See also ==
- Electoral Count Act (1887)
- Bush v. Gore (2000)
