= Susanne Young =

Vermont attorney general

27th Attorney General of Vermont
- In office July 5, 2022 – January 5, 2023
- Governor: Phil Scott
- Preceded by: T. J. Donovan
- Succeeded by: Charity Clark

Secretary of the Vermont Agency of Administration
- In office January 5, 2017 – November 6, 2021
- Governor: Phil Scott
- Preceded by: Trey Martin
- Succeeded by: Kristin Clouser

Personal details
- Born: Susanne Richardson; October 30, 1956 (age 68); Northfield, Vermont, U.S.
- Political party: Republican
- Spouse: Peter Young
- Children: 1
- Education: University of Vermont (BS); Vermont Law School (JD)

Susanne Young (née Richardson; born October 30, 1956) is an American lawyer and public official who served as the Vermont Attorney General from July 5, 2022 to January 5, 2023. Young was appointed to the position by Governor Phil Scott following the resignation of T. J. Donovan and was the first woman to hold the position.

== Early life ==
Born Susanne Richardson in Northfield, Vermont on October 30, 1956, the daughter of Elfriede (Hopfner) Richardson and John C. Richardson. She is a 1974 graduate of Northfield High School, and in 1978 she received a Bachelor of Science degree from the University of Vermont. In 1981, Young received her Juris Doctor degree cum laude from Vermont Law School, where she was editor-in-chief of the law review. She was admitted to the bar on December 17, 1981.

== Career ==
During her career, Young held several appointed positions in Vermont's state government under both Democratic and Republican governors, including assistant attorney general (1982–1999), deputy state treasurer when Jim Douglas served as Vermont State Treasurer (August 31, 1999 – January 8, 2003), legal counsel to Douglas when he served as governor (January 9, 2003 – January 4, 2011), and deputy attorney general during William Sorrell's tenure as Vermont's attorney general (November 13, 2012 – January 4, 2017). When Scott became governor on January 5, 2017, he named Young as secretary of the Vermont Agency of Administration, and she served until November 6, 2021, when she retired.

In June 2022, T. J. Donovan resigned as Vermont Attorney General in order to accept a position at Roblox Corporation. Scott appointed Young to complete Donovan's term, which expired in January 2023. When she accepted the appointment, Young indicated she did not intend to run for a full term in the 2022 election. She was succeeded by Charity Clark, who won the Democratic nomination and the general election.

== Personal life ==
Young is married to Northfield attorney Peter F. Young. She is the stepmother of two sons and the mother of a daughter.

Legal offices
Preceded by Josh Diamond; Acting	Attorney General of Vermont; 2022–2023	Succeeded by Charity Clark
