= 2024 Vermont Attorney General election =

- November 5, 2024
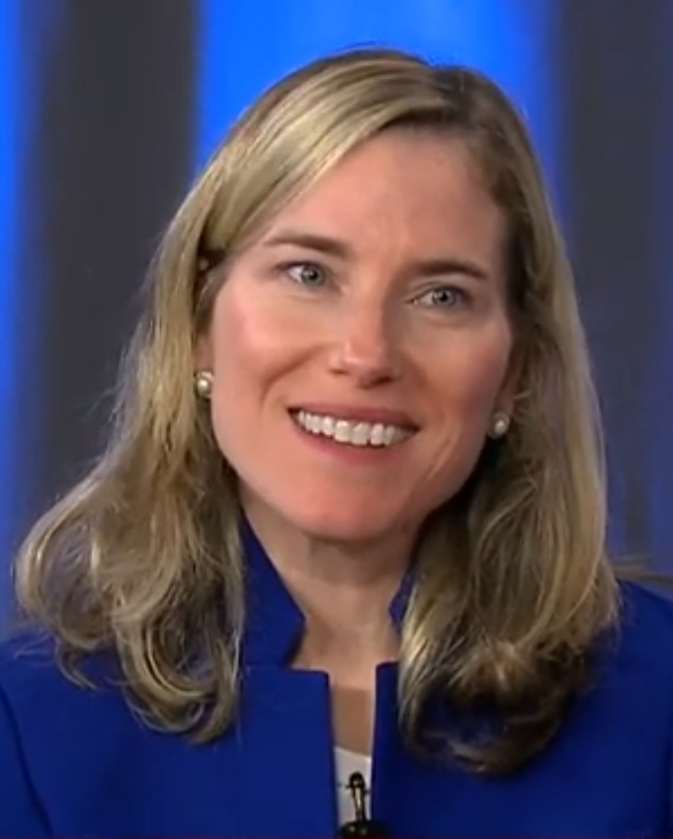

Nominee	Charity Clark	Ture Nelson
Party	Democratic	Republican
Popular vote	200,711	128,798
Percentage	57.82%	37.10%
- Clark: 40–50% 50–60% 60–70% 70–80% 80–90% Nelson: 40–50% 50–60% 60–70% Tie: 40–50% No votes
Attorney General before election
Charity Clark
Democratic
Elected Attorney General
Charity Clark
Democratic

The 2024 Vermont Attorney General election was held on November 5, 2024, to elect the attorney general of the state of Vermont. It coincided with the concurrent presidential election, as well as various state and local elections, including for U.S. Senate, U.S. House, and governor of Vermont. Incumbent attorney general Charity Clark was re-elected to a second term two-year term after defeating Berlin Town Administrator Ture Nelson in the general election. Primary elections took place on August 13, 2024.

== Democratic primary ==
=== Candidates ===
==== Nominee ====
- Charity Clark, incumbent attorney general

=== Results ===
Democratic primary results
Party	Candidate	Votes	%
Democratic	Charity Clark (incumbent)	43,275	99.05%
Write-in		416	0.95%
Total votes		43,691	100.00%

== Republican primary ==
=== Candidates ===
==== Withdrew after nomination ====
- H. Brooke Paige, newsstand owner and perennial candidate

==== Replacement nominee ====
- Ture Nelson, Berlin Town Administrator

=== Results ===
Republican primary results
Party	Candidate	Votes	%
Republican	H. Brooke Paige	18,081	97.06%
Write-in		548	2.94%
Total votes		18,629	100.00%

== Progressive primary ==
=== Candidates ===
==== Withdrew after nomination ====
- Elijah Bergman, lawyer and nominee for attorney general in 2022

=== Results ===
Progressive primary results
Party	Candidate	Votes	%
Progressive	Elijah Bergman	270	87.95%
Write-in		37	12.05%
Total votes		307	100.00%

== General election ==
=== Predictions ===
Source	Ranking	As of
Sabato's Crystal Ball	Safe D	July 25, 2024

=== Results ===

2024 Vermont Attorney General election
Party	Candidate	Votes	%	±%
Democratic	Charity Clark (incumbent)	200,711	57.82%	–7.25%
Republican	Ture Nelson	128,798	37.10%	+2.34%
Green Mountain Peace and Justice	Kevin Gustafson	17,159	4.94%	N/A
Write-in		490	0.13%	–0.04%
Total votes		347,158	100.00%	N/A
Democratic hold				

==== By county ====
County	Charity Clark Democratic		Ture Nelson Republican		Various candidates Other parties	
County	#	%	#	%	#	%
Addison	12,756	59.43%	7,709	35.92%	998	4.65%
Bennington	10,279	55.42%	7,375	38.1%	1,254	6.48%
Caledonia	7,480	47.5%	7,545	47.92%	721	4.58%
Chittenden	62,560	69.03%	24,626	27.17%	3,438	3.79%
Essex	1,155	35.78%	1,916	59.36%	157	4.86%
Franklin	11,413	44.83%	12,954	50.88%	1,094	4.3%
Grand Isle	2,525	53.11%	2,069	43.52%	2660	3.36%
Lamoille	8,080	58.34%	5,142	37.13%	627	4.53%
Orange	8,650	51.67%	7,277	43.47%	813	4.86%
Orleans	6,093	43.68%	7,252	51.99%	605	4.34%
Rutland	13,796	42.69%	15,473	47.88%	3,049	9.43%
Washington	20,259	61.64%	11,359	34.11%	1,416	4.25%
Windham	15,641	64.72%	7,019	29.04%	1,507	6.24%
Windsor	19,304	59.96%	11,082	34.42%	1,810	5.63%
Totals	200,711	54.19%	128,798	37.1%	17,649	5.08%

Counties that flipped from Democratic to Republican

- Caledonia (largest municipality: St. Johnsbury)
- Franklin (largest municipality: St. Albans)
- Orleans (largest municipality: Newport)
- Rutland (largest municipality: Rutland)
