= Democratic Attorneys General Association =

Organization of U.S. Democratic attorneys general

- Co-Chair: Kathy Jennings (DE)
- Co-Chair: Kwame Raoul (IL)
- Vice Chair: Keith Ellison (MN)
- Founded: 2002
- Affiliated: Democratic Party
- State attorneys general: 23 / 50
- Territorial attorneys general: 1 / 5
- Federal district attorneys general: 1 / 1

Website
- dems.ag

Party affiliation of current United States attorneys general: Democratic (23 states, 1 territory (Note: Attorney generals in the Northern Mariana Islands are elected non-partisan; however, Edward Manibusan affiliates with the Democratic Party), and 1 district) Republican (27 states, 1 territory (Note: Attorney generals in Guam are elected non-partisan; however, Doug Moylan affiliates with the Republican Party)) Non-partisan (2 territories) New Progressive (1 territory)

The Democratic Attorneys General Association (DAGA) is a United States national political advocacy group that focuses on electing Democrats as state attorneys general. Its Republican counterpart is the Republican Attorneys General Association. It currently has 24 members, comprising 23 state attorneys general and the DC attorney general.

== Operations ==
DAGA was formed in 2002.

Its executive committee is made up of Nevada attorney general Aaron Ford, Attorney General of Delaware Kathy Jennings, Attorney General of Minnesota Keith Ellison, Illinois attorney general Kwame Raoul, Massachusetts attorney general Andrea Campbell, Attorney General of California Rob Bonta, and Vermont attorney general Charity Clark.

== Position on abortion ==
In 2019, the group announced that it would not endorse any candidate who did not support abortion. The only anti-abortion Democratic attorney general at the time was Mississippi attorney general Jim Hood. This decision was criticized by former senator Heidi Heitkamp.

== See also ==
- State attorney general
- Republican Attorneys General Association
- Democratic Governors Association
