= 2022 Vermont Attorney General election =

- November 8, 2022
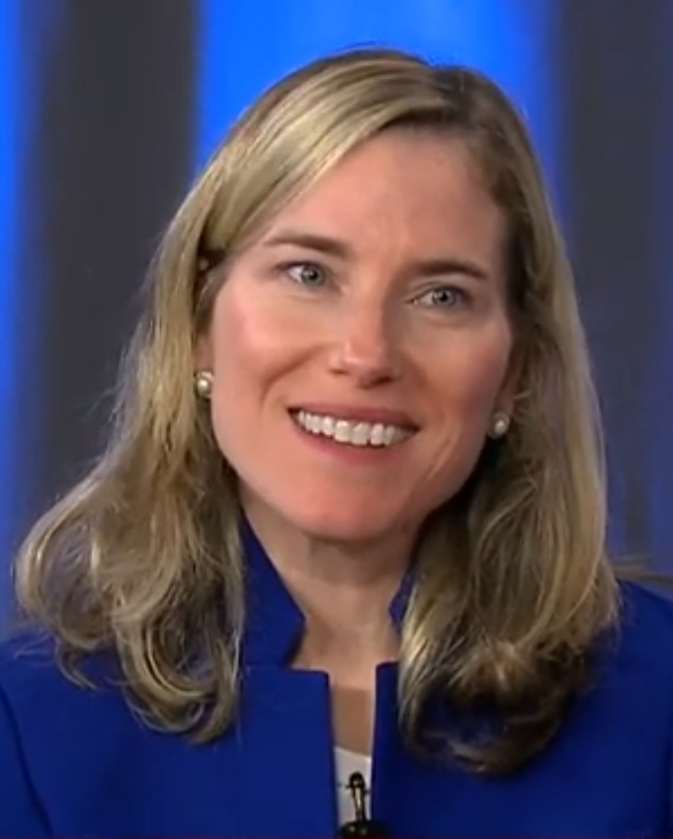

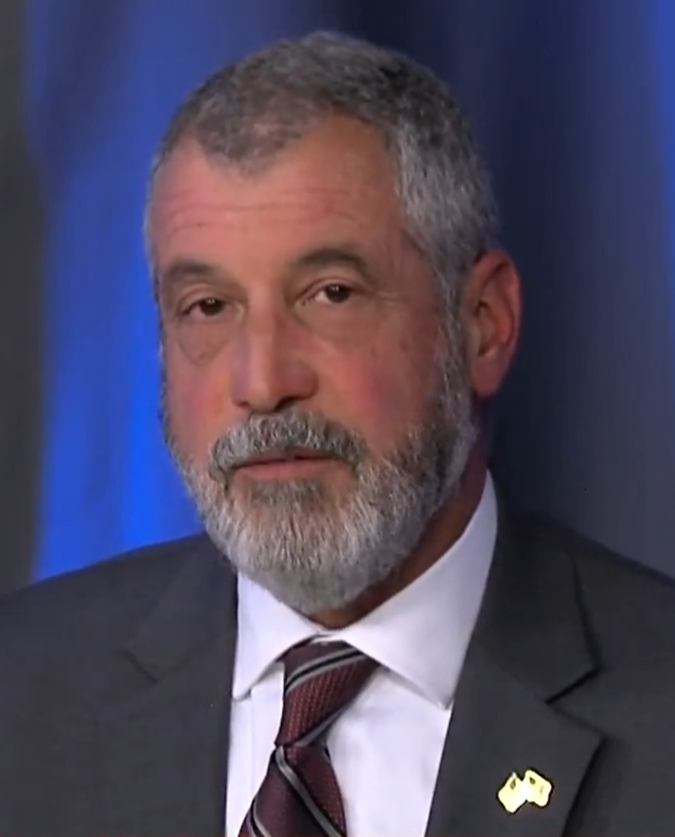
Nominee	Charity Clark	Mike Tagliavia
Party	Democratic	Republican
Popular vote	179,098	95,661
Percentage	65.07%	34.76%
- Clark: 50–60% 60–70% 70–80% 80–90% >90% Tagliavia: 50–60% 60–70% 70–80% No votes
Attorney General before election
Susanne Young
Republican
Elected Attorney General
Charity Clark
Democratic

The 2022 Vermont Attorney General election took place on November 8, 2022, to elect the next attorney general of Vermont. Former Democratic Attorney General T.J. Donovan resigned after three terms in office. Susanne Young, appointed by Governor Phil Scott to fill the vacancy left by Donovan, was not running for a full term, and Vermont Republicans nominated Mike Tagliavia to run against Charity Clark, the Democratic candidate.

== Republican primary ==
=== Candidates ===
==== Withdrew after winning primary ====
- H. Brooke Paige, newsstand owner and perennial candidate

==== Replacement nominee ====
- Mike Tagliavia, retired businessman

==== Declined ====
- Christina Nolan, former U.S. Attorney for the District of Vermont (ran for U.S. Senate)
- Susanne Young, incumbent attorney general

=== Results ===
Republican primary results
Party	Candidate	Votes	%
Republican	H. Brooke Paige	20,668	95.7%
Write-in		919	4.3%
Total votes		21,587	100.0%

== Democratic primary ==
=== Candidates ===
==== Nominee ====
- Charity Clark, former chief of staff to former Attorney General T.J. Donovan

==== Eliminated in primary ====
- Rory Thibault, Washington County State's Attorney

==== Declined ====
- T.J. Donovan, former attorney general
- Sarah George, Chittenden County State's Attorney (ran for re-election)
- Shap Smith, former Speaker of the Vermont House of Representatives and candidate for lieutenant governor in 2016

=== Results ===
Democratic primary results
Party	Candidate	Votes	%
Democratic	Charity Clark	58,589	67.1%
Democratic	Rory Thibault	28,383	32.5%
Write-in		376	0.4%
Total votes		87,348	100.0%

== Progressive primary ==
=== Candidates ===
==== Withdrew after winning primary ====
- Elijah Bergman, attorney

=== Results ===
Progressive primary results
Party	Candidate	Votes	%
Progressive	Elijah Bergman	477	92.6%
Write-in		38	7.4%
Total votes		515	100.0%

== General election ==
Clark was considered to be nearly certain to win, and the race was called for her as soon as polls closed. Upon her swearing-in, she became Vermont's first elected female Attorney General.

=== Predictions ===
Source	Ranking	As of
Sabato's Crystal Ball	Safe D (flip)	September 14, 2022
Elections Daily	Safe D (flip)	November 1, 2022

=== Results ===
Republican primary results
Party	Candidate	Votes	%
Democratic	Charity Clark	179,098	65.07%
Republican	Mike Tagliavia	95,661	34.76%
Write-in		467	0.17%
Total votes		275,226	100.00%
Democratic gain from Republican			

==== By county ====
County	Charity Clark Democratic		Michael Tagliavia Republican		Various candidates Other parties	
County	#	%	#	%	#	%
Addison	11,760	67.53%	5,655	32.47%	0	0.0%
Bennington	9,444	62.07%	5,770	37.93%	0	0.0%
Caledonia	6,698	54.51%	5,587	45.47%	3	0.02%
Chittenden	53,524	74.63%	18,198	25.37%	0	0.0%
Essex	978	42.06%	1,346	57.89%	1	0.04%
Franklin	9,844	52.04%	9,073	47.96%	0	0.0%
Grand Isle	2,277	59,.54%	1,547	40.46%	0	0.0%
Lamoille	7,226	66.32%	3,670	33.68%	0	0.0%
Orange	7,589	58.64%	5,351	41.35%	2	0.02%
Orleans	5,362	51.84%	4,979	48.14%	2	0.02%
Rutland	13,005	51.4%	12,298	48.6%	0	0.0%
Washington	18,679	69.9%	8,043	30.1%	2	0.01%
Windham	14,117	73.59%	5,065	26.4%	1	0.01%
Windsor	17,350	67.05%	8,527	32.95%	1	0.01%
Totals	177,853	65.15%	95,109	34.84%	12	0.01%

Counties that flipped from Democratic to Republican

- Essex (largest town: Lunenburg)

== See also ==
- Vermont Attorney General
