= J'Ada Finch-Sheen =

American lawyer

Attorney General of the United States Virgin Islands
- In office 1982–1985

Personal details
- Education: College of the Virgin Islands (BA); Howard University School of Law (JD)

J'Ada Mergeaux Finch-Sheen is a United States Virgin Islands lawyer and businessperson who served as the territory's first female Attorney General and acting Governor.

== Education ==
J'Ada Mergeaux Finch-Sheen completed a bachelor's degree in 1975 at the College of the Virgin Islands. She earned a J.D., cum laude, from Howard University School of Law in 1978.

== Career ==
Finch-Sheen became an assistant attorney general in the United States Virgin Islands Department of Justice in 1979. In early 1982, she became chief of the criminal and family division. In 1982, she became the first female Attorney General of the United States Virgin Islands. She served as acting Governor of the U.S. Virgin Islands in December 1983, becoming the territory's first female Governor. She resigned as Attorney General in 1985.

In 1998, Finch-Sheen became the chief executive officer of the Daily News Publishing Co.

== Personal life ==
In 1985, Finch-Sheen moved to Santo Domingo, Dominican Republic. Her husband, Albert Sheen, is a federal bankruptcy court judge.
