= Charles J. Adams (Vermont politician) =

American politician and lawyer

16th Vermont Attorney General
- In office 1962–1963
- Governor: F. Ray Keyser Jr.
- Preceded by: Thomas M. Debevoise
- Succeeded by: Charles E. Gibson Jr.

Personal details
- Born: Charles Jairus Adams; February 17, 1917 Randolph, Vermont, U.S.
- Died: May 16, 2008 (aged 91) Williston, Vermont, U.S.
- Party: Republican
- Spouse: Mary Ella Tobey (m. 1942)
- Children: 2

Military service
- Allegiance: United States
- Branch/service: United States Army
- Rank: Captain
- Unit: 3rd Armored Division
- Battles/wars: World War II

Charles J. Adams (February 17, 1917 – May 16, 2008) was a Vermont attorney whose career included an interim appointment as Vermont Attorney General.

== Biography ==
Charles Jairus Adams was born in Randolph, Vermont, on February 17, 1917, the son of Charles Bayley Adams and Jeanette (Metzger) Adams. His father served as an Associate Justice of the Vermont Supreme Court from 1949 to 1961. Adams was raised and educated in Waterbury, and graduated from Norwich University in 1939.

Adams joined the United States Army for World War II and served as a captain with the 3rd Armored Division during combat in the European Theater of Operations. On July 5, 1942, he married Mary Ella Tobey of Belmont, Massachusetts; they were married in Leesville, Louisiana, while Adams was stationed at Camp Beauregard prior to his unit's departure for Europe.

In 1951 Adams graduated from the Boston University School of Law and became an attorney, first in Montpelier and later in Waterbury. A Republican in politics, he was active in local government including Waterbury village trustee and president, and member of the town of Waterbury's school board. He was also involved in several civic and fraternal organizations, including the Masons and Shriners, the Norwich University Alumni Association and the Norwich University Cemetery Board of Trustees.

In December 1961, Governor F. Ray Keyser announced that he would appoint Adams as Vermont Attorney General to fill the vacancy left by the resignation of Thomas M. Debevoise. Adams assumed the office on January 2, 1962, and served until the end of Debevoise's term in January 1963. He did not run for a full term in 1962, and was succeeded by Charles E. Gibson Jr., who had served as his deputy.

Adams continued practicing law, and later moved to South Burlington. He died on May 16, 2008, at the Vermont Respite House in Williston. He was survived by his daughters Mary Jean Sturgis and Carol Allen.

Legal offices
Preceded by Thomas M. Debevoise	Attorney General of Vermont; 1962–1963	Succeeded by Charles E. Gibson Jr.
