= Ariel K. Smith =

U.S. lawyer and politician

Ariel Smith

19th Attorney General of the United States Virgin Islands
- In office April 14, 2023 – March 15, 2024
- Governor: Albert Bryan
- Preceded by: Carol Thomas-Jacobs (acting)
- Succeeded by: Ian Clement (acting)

Personal details
- Born: Saint Thomas, U.S. Virgin Islands
- Education: Rutgers University, Newark (JD)

Ariel M. Smith is a U.S. Virgin Islands lawyer who served as the 19th attorney general of the United States Virgin Islands from 2023 to 2024.

== Early life and education ==
Smith was born on Saint Thomas, U.S. Virgin Islands. She graduated from Charlotte Amalie High School. She completed a J.D. from Rutgers Law School.

== Career ==
For over ten years, Smith worked in private practice as an associate attorney with Smock and Moorhead on Saint Thomas. From 2006 to 2011, Smith was an assistant territorial public defender. In this role, she worked in the criminal defense of misdemeanors and felony offenses such as domestic violence and white collar crimes.

In 2011, Smith joined the civil division of the U.S. Virgin Islands Department of Justice as an assistant attorney general, serving role for seven years. In 2016, she was promoted to chief of the civil division where she oversaw five attorneys and two support staff.

=== Attorney General of the Virgin Islands ===
On March 20, 2023, governor Albert Bryan nominated Smith to succeed Carol Thomas-Jacobs as the attorney general of the United States Virgin Islands.

In May 2023, Smith's office engaged in a high-profile effort to subpoena billionaire Elon Musk as part of the territory's ongoing litigation against JP Morgan Chase. Court filings indicate that despite hiring private investigators, the USVI had been unable to locate Musk to serve him personally and subsequently sought a judge's permission to serve the subpoena via his electric vehicle company, Tesla, Inc.

The subpoena demanded all communications between Musk and the bank regarding Epstein, as well as any documents in Musk's possession concerning Epstein's "involvement in human trafficking" and his "procurement of girls or women for commercial sex." Musk denied any business ties to Epstein, characterizing the subpoena on social media as "idiotic" and stating that "that cretin never advised me on anything whatsoever."

On June 30, 2023, Smith was sworn in as attorney general on a permanent basis during a ceremony at the Governor's Mansion.

On September 26, 2023, Smith announced a $75 million settlement with JPMorgan Chase to resolve the territory's lawsuit regarding the bank's financial relationship with Jeffrey Epstein. The settlement included $30 million for charitable organizations fighting human trafficking and $25 million to enhance local law enforcement capabilities.

While the agreement resolved the claims against the bank, it notably did not include a release of liability for former bank executive Jes Staley. Smith stated that the settlement was "an historic victory for survivors" and noted that the bank had agreed to implement "meaningful anti-trafficking measures" to prevent future misconduct.

On March 15, 2024, Smith resigned as Attorney General after a tenure of 259 days. In her resignation letter, she stated she was stepping down at Governor Bryan's "specific request" following a conversation with his chief of staff. Governor Bryan later characterized the dismissal as being predicated on a "difference of approach," stating that they were no longer "philosophically... aligned." Following her departure from the top post, Smith exercised a provision in her collective bargaining agreement to revert to her previous rank as an assistant attorney general within the Department of Justice.

== See also ==
- List of female state attorneys general in the United States
- List of minority attorneys general in the United States

Legal offices
Preceded by Carol Thomas-Jacobs; Acting	Attorney General of the United States Virgin Islands; 2023–2024	Succeeded by Ian Clement; Acting
