= Gordon C. Rhea =

American historian and politician

Gordon Rhea

20th Attorney General of the United States Virgin Islands
- Incumbent
- Assumed office April 29, 2024; Acting: April 29, 2024 – October 24, 2024
- Governor: Albert Bryan
- Preceded by: Ian Clement (acting)

Personal details
- Born: Tennessee, U.S.
- Spouse: Catherine Bryant
- Education: Indiana University, Bloomington (BA); Harvard University (MA); Stanford University (JD)

Gordon C. Rhea is an American lawyer and historian who specializes in the American Civil War, especially the Overland Campaign. He has served as the attorney general of the United States Virgin Islands since 2024.

== Career ==
Rhea received the Civil War Regiments Book Award for his book on the Battle of the Wilderness, The Battle of the Wilderness, May 5–6, 1864. His work on the Battle of Cold Harbor, Cold Harbor, received the Austin Civil War Round Table's Laney Prize. Rhea has lectured at the U.S. Army Training and Doctrine Command and for Civil War round tables.

Rhea has provided commentary for CNN.

He graduated from Indiana University (BA), Harvard University (MA), and Stanford Law School (JD).

== Selected works ==
- The Battle of the Wilderness, May 5–6, 1864. Baton Rouge: Louisiana State University Press, 1994. ISBN 0807118737 OCLC 29429480
- The Battles for Spotsylvania Court House and the Road to Yellow Tavern, May 7–12, 1864. Baton Rouge: Louisiana State University Press, 1997. ISBN 0807121363 OCLC 36011625
- Cold Harbor: Grant and Lee, May 26–June 3, 1864. Baton Rouge: Louisiana State University Press, 2002. ISBN 0807128031 OCLC 49680108
- To the North Anna River: Grant and Lee, May 13–25, 1864. Baton Rouge: Louisiana State University Press, 2000. ISBN 0807125350 OCLC 42810622
- Carrying the Flag: The Story of Private Charles Whilden, the Confederacy's Unlikely Hero. New York: Basic Books, 2004. ISBN 0465069568 OCLC 52377435
- On to Petersburg: Grant and Lee, June 4–14, 1864. Baton Rouge: Louisiana State University Press, 2017. ISBN 9780807167472 OCLC 966560826

== Personal life ==
Rhea is married with two sons.

Legal offices
Preceded by Ian Clement; Acting	Attorney General of the United States Virgin Islands; 2024–present	Incumbent
