= Charles E. Gibson Jr. =

American judge (1925–2017)

Charles E. Gibson Jr. (December 20, 1925 – October 10, 2017) was an attorney and Republican political official who served one term as Vermont Attorney General.

== Biography ==
Charles Edward Gibson Jr. was born in St. Johnsbury, Vermont, on December 20, 1925. He graduated from St. Johnsbury Academy in 1944. He attended the University of Michigan, from which he graduated in 1949, and the University of Michigan Law School, from which he graduated in 1952.

After admission to the bar, Gibson practiced in the St. Johnsbury office of Sterry R. Waterman and John H. Downs. In 1954, he opened his own office in St. Johnsbury.

A Republican, Gibson was state's attorney of Caledonia County from 1955 to 1960. He served as Judge of the Caledonia Municipal Court from 1960 to 1962. From 1961 to 1963, he served as Vermont's Deputy Attorney General. In 1962, Gibson was a successful candidate for the Republican nomination for Vermont Attorney General, defeating John S. Burgess. He went on to win the general election by defeating Democrat Robert W. Larrow, and he served one term, January 1963 to January 1965.

After leaving office, Gibson returned to practicing law, and became a resident of Montpelier. He continued to remain active in politics. In 1966, he was one of a group of former attorneys general and legislators who endorsed James L. Oakes for Attorney General. In May 1968, he was one of the attorneys who organized an effort to endorse Richard C. Thomas for Vermont Secretary of State. In September 1968, he was chairman of the committee that drafted the platform for the Vermont Republican Party. In 1972 and 1974, he was one of several former attorneys general who endorsed Kimberly B. Cheney for the position. Also in 1974, Gibson was chairman of the group of attorneys who endorsed Richard W. Mallary's campaign for the United States Senate.

In addition to practicing law, Gibson also took part in other government and legal activities, including serving as a member of the state board of bar examiners.

In 1981, Gibson served on the panel that reviewed applications and made a recommendation when Vermont's two US District Court judges appointed a full-time magistrate to replace four part-time individuals who had performed the magistrate's function.

In retirement, Gibson continued to reside in Montpelier. He died in a Barre, Vermont nursing home on October 10, 2017.

== Sources ==
=== Books ===
- State of Vermont Legislative Directory. Montpelier, VT: Vermont Secretary of State. 1969. p. 651.

=== Newspapers ===
- "Charles E. Gibson Opens Law Office in St. Johnsbury". Burlington Free Press. Burlington, VT. June 7, 1954. p. 5.
- "Gibson Over Burgess". Burlington Free Press. Burlington, VT. September 12, 1962. p. 1.
- "Advertisement: Vote for Jim Oakes". Bennington Banner. Bennington, VT. November 4, 1966. p. 11.
- "Lawyers for Thomas Committee Formed". Burlington Free Press. Burlington, VT. Free Press Capitol Bureau. May 14, 1968. p. 3.
- "GOP Moves Cautiously on Gun Control". Burlington Free Press. Burlington, VT. Free Press Capitol Bureau. September 13, 1968. p. 3.
- "Advertisement: Cheney for Attorney General". Bennington Banner. Bennington, VT. September 7, 1972. p. 8.
- "Philip Hoff Elected Vermont Governor". Burlington Free Press. Burlington, VT. November 7, 1962. p. 1.
- "Mallary Would Support Amendment on Finances". Burlington Free Press. Burlington, VT. October 28, 1974. p. 12.
- "Salmon Lags $6,000-plus Behind Kennedy in Gubernatorial Campaign 'Gifts'". Burlington Free Press. Burlington, VT. November 1, 1974. p. 7.
- Smith, Jane (October 4, 1978). "60 Percent Pass Exam: Law Grads Making the Grade". Burlington Free Press. Burlington, VT. p. 1.
- "Full-Time Magistrate to Replace Paret-Timers". Burlington Free Press. Burlington, VT. September 20, 1981. p. 26.
- "Obituary, Kenneth Stewart Gibson". Waterbury Record. Waterbury, VT. October 17, 2013.
- "Charles E. Gibson Jr. Obituary". The Times Argus. Barre, VT. October 12, 2017.

Party political offices
Preceded by Thomas M. Debevoise	Republican nominee for Vermont Attorney General; 1962, 1964	Succeeded by James L. Oakes
Legal offices
Preceded by Charles J. Adams	Attorney General of Vermont; 1963–1965	Succeeded by John P. Connarn
