= Sarah George =

American lawyer and politician

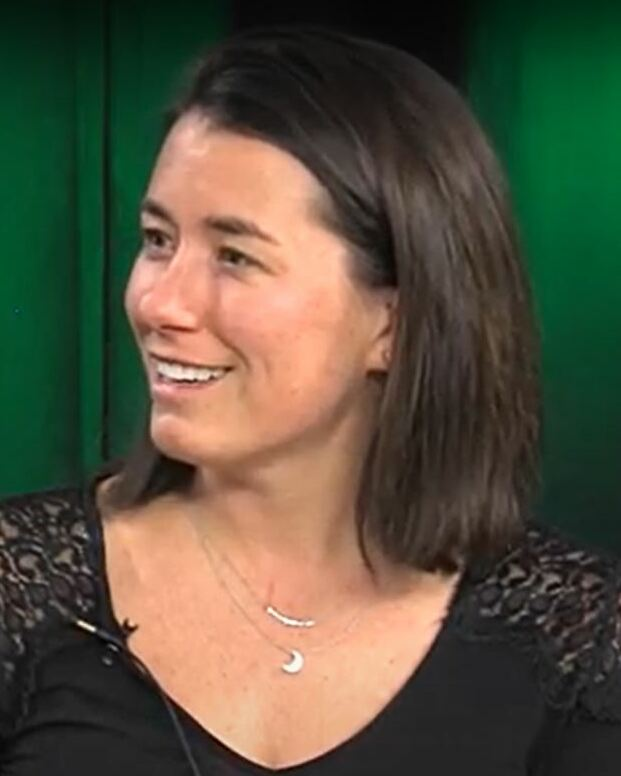
- George in 2018

State's Attorney of Chittenden County
- Incumbent
- Assumed office January 3, 2017
- Preceded by: T. J. Donovan

Personal details
- Born: 1982 or 1983 (age 43–44) Quechee, Vermont, U.S.
- Party: Democratic
- Education: University of Connecticut (BA); Castleton University (MA); Vermont Law School (JD)

Sarah Fair George (born 1982/1983) is an American politician and prosecutor from the state of Vermont. A member of the Democratic Party, she is the State's Attorney of Chittenden County since 2017. A progressive prosecutor, she has pursued criminal justice reform in office, avoiding seeking cash bail and discouraging the practice of non-public safety traffic stops.

== Early life ==
George was born and raised in Quechee, Vermont. As late as 2018, she worked part-time as a waitress in a Quechee restaurant. She holds a bachelor's degree in Criminal Justice and Psychology from the University of Connecticut, a master's degree in Forensic Psychology from Castleton State College, and a J.D. from Vermont Law School.

== Career ==
George was appointed to the position in 2017 when her predecessor T.J. Donovan left office after being elected Attorney General of Vermont. She won a full term in 2018 with 99.1% of the vote. In 2022, she was challenged in the Democratic primary by Ted Kenney, a member of the Williston Board of Selectmen who claimed that George's policies made the county less safe. Kenney was supported by multiple police unions, and the Vermont Republican Party encouraged Republicans to request a Democratic ballot so they could vote against George. However, George easily prevailed in the primary, defeating Kenney by a 53%-33% margin. She was unopposed in the general election.

In the August 2026 Democratic primary, George was challenged by her former deputy, Bram Kranichfeld. As of 2026, Kranichfeld was State's Attorney for Franklin County, where he declined to run for reelection. George held off Kranichfeld's challenge by a 48%-45% margin.

In April 2026, George declined to prosecute three protesters who were arrested by Vermont State Police at an ICE raid.

=== Policies ===
George has emphasized decarceral practices during her tenure as State's Attorney. She has ended cash bail in Chittenden County, attributing it to a "system [...] built on the oppression and caging of black, brown, and poor people, designed to preserve racial and class order". She seeks to avoid jail time in nonviolent criminal cases, and has declined to prosecute many cases resulting from non-public safety related traffic stops, due to possible racial profiling. George is a strong proponent of restorative justice programs.

The frequency of some types of violent crime, including assault, decreased between 2024 and 2025, and overall arrests have decreased since George took office. George's critics criticize an increase in visible drug use, homelessness, and resulting crime in Chittenden County, and Burlington in particular, during George's tenure.
