= Attorney General of the United States Virgin Islands =

Government position

The attorney general of the United States Virgin Islands supervises and directs the Department of Justice. The current attorney general is Gordon C. Rhea. In 1962, the Virgin Islands Department of Law was established as an executive department in the government of the U.S. Virgin Islands pursuant to the Virgin Islands Code (Title 3, Chapter 8). With the passage of Act No. 5265 in 1987, the department was now referred to as the Virgin Islands Department of Justice. Additionally, the passage of Act No. 5265 placed the Bureau of Corrections under the jurisdiction and administration of the Department of Justice—remaining there until October 1, 2009. The department has the following divisions:

- Solicitor General Division
- Civil Division
- Criminal Division
- Domestic Violence Unit
- Family/Special Victims United
- Bureau of Investigations
- White Collar Crime and Public Corruption Section
- The Division of Gaming Enforcement
- Virgin Islands Civil Rights Commission
- Paternity & Child Support Division
- Victim Services Unit
- Sexual Offender Registry

== List of attorneys general (1961–present) ==
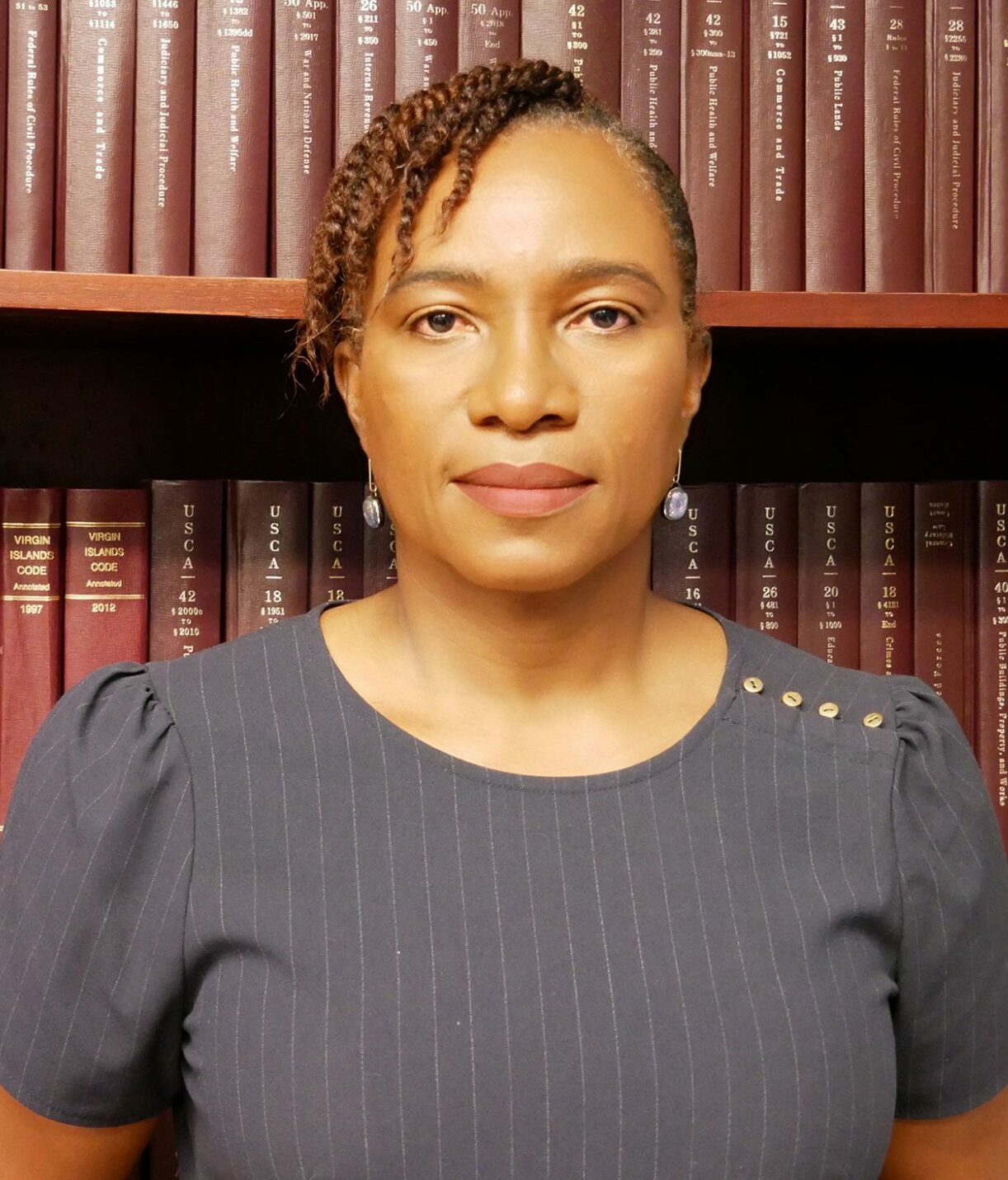
Carol Thomas-Jacobs, former acting Attorney General

- Francisco Cornerio (1961–1969)
- Peter J. O'Dea (1969–1971)
- Ronald H. Tonkin (1971–1973)
- Verne A. Hodge (1973–1976)
- Edgar D. Ross (1977–1978)
- Iver A. Swan (1978–1980)
- J'Ada Finch-Sheen (1981–1984) [1st female]
- Leroy A. Mercer (1984–1986)
- Godfrey deCastro (1986–1990)
- Rosalie S. Ballentine (1991–1995)
- Julio A. Brady (1995–1999)
- Iver A. Stridiron (1999–2004)
- Alva A. Swan (2004–2005)
- Kerry Drue (2005–2006)
- Vincent Franklin Frazer (2006–2015)
- Terri Griffiths (2015) [Acting]
- Claude E. Walker (2015–2019)
- Denise George-Counts (2019–2023)
- Carol Thomas-Jacobs Acting (2023)
- Ariel K. Smith (2023–2024)
- Ian Clement Acting (2024)
- Gordon Rhea (2024–present)

== See also ==
- Attorney general
- Justice ministry
- Politics of the United States Virgin Islands
- United States Department of Justice
