= Frederick M. Reed =

American lawyer

Frederick M. Reed (July 28, 1924 – March 6, 2012) was a Vermont attorney and businessman who served as Vermont Attorney General.

== Early life ==
Reed was born in Rutland, Vermont on July 28, 1924. He was raised in Manchester, where he attended the local schools and graduated from Burr and Burton Academy in 1942.

== World War II ==
After his high school graduation, Reed was employed at a machine tool plant in Springfield. In February 1943, he enlisted in the United States Army for World War II. After completing his initial training, he served in the China Burma India Theater as a replacement soldier for Merrill's Marauders, leading supply trains of pack mules for troops that created roadblocks and other obstacles on the Burma Road to slow the retreating Imperial Japanese Army. After his overseas service, Reed returned to the United States and attended officer candidate school. The end of the war occurred before he could return to combat, and he was discharged in October 1945.

== Post-World War II ==
After the war, Reed enrolled at the University of Vermont, and the advanced standing he received for credits earned while in the Army enabled him to graduate in three years. He then became a student at Albany Law School, and graduated first in the class of 1950.

After attaining admission to the bar, Reed practiced law in Montpelier.

== Vermont Attorney General ==
In January 1955, Robert Stafford, then serving as Attorney General, appointed Reed to be his deputy.

When Stafford ran for Lieutenant Governor of Vermont in 1956, he supported Reed to succeed him. Reed won the Republican nomination, and went on to win the general election. He was reelected in 1958, and served from January 1957 until resigning in January 1960. He was succeeded by Thomas M. Debevoise, who had served as his deputy.

== Later career ==
Reed resigned as Attorney General in order to become general counsel for the Rock of Ages Corporation, and was later appointed vice president of sales and marketing in addition to his legal duties.

In 1969 Reed left Rock of Ages to become Secretary of Civil and Military Affairs (chief assistant) for Governor Deane C. Davis, and he worked on passage of two of the Davis administration's signature programs, the Act 250 environmental protection law, and the sales tax that enabled Davis to eliminate a budget shortfall.

During Davis's second term (1971 to 1973), Reed served as the governor's counsel, a part-time position that enabled him to resume the private practice of law, first in Essex and later in Williston.

Reed subsequently became general counsel for the G. S. Blodgett Oven Company, where he later became a vice president and member of the board of directors. In 1981, Blodgett purchased the J.C. Pitman & Sons company of Concord, New Hampshire, a manufacturer of fryers and other restaurant and institutional kitchen equipment. Reed served as Pitman's president for five years, and then returned to his position as Blodgett's general counsel and vice president until retiring in 1992.

== Later life ==
In retirement, Reed resided in Vinalhaven, Maine, and spent winters in Florida and South Carolina. In 2006 his wife and he purchased a condominium in Barre in 2006, which became their primary residence, and enabled them to spend more time with their children and grandchildren.

== Death and burial ==
Reed died in Barre on March 6, 2012. He was buried at Green Mount Cemetery in Montpelier.

== Family ==
Frederick M. Reed was the son of Reginald H. and Lucy Pratt Reed.

In 1946 he married Jacquelyn Laurel Hansen (1926-2009), known as Laurel. They were the parents of three daughters, Luci, Martha, and Dorothy.

== Sources ==
=== Internet ===
- "Obituary, Frederick M. Reed, 1924-2012". Meaningfulfunerals.net/. 2012. Archived from the original on May 10, 2017.

=== Newspapers ===
- "Stafford and Reed Winners in Vermont Primary Contest". Burlington Free Press. Burlington, VT. September 12, 1956. p. 1.
- "Governor has 22,000 Edge Over Branon". Bennington Banner. Bennington, VT. Associated Press. November 7, 1956. p. 4.
- "Meyer, Stafford, Prouty Elected". Burlington Free Press. Burlington, VT. November 5, 1958. p. 4.
- "Vt. Atty. Gen. Reed Resigns; Debevoise may be Named". Burlington Free Press. Burlington, VT. January 28, 1960. p. 4.
- "Rock of Ages Names Reed". Burlington Free Press. Burlington, VT. February 8, 1960. p. 4.
- "Obituary, Laurel Reed". Rutland Herald. Rutland, VT. December 1, 2009.

Party political offices
Preceded by Robert Stafford	Republican nominee for Vermont Attorney General; 1956, 1958	Succeeded by Thomas M. Debevoise
Legal offices
Preceded by Robert Stafford	Attorney General of Vermont; 1957–1960	Succeeded by Thomas M. Debevoise
