= Republican Attorneys General Association =

Organization of U.S. Republican attorneys general

- Chair: Austin Knudsen (MT)
- Vice Chair: Mike Hilgers (NE)
- Policy Chairwoman: Liz Murrill (LA)
- Immediate Past: Kris Kobach (KS)
- Founded: 2014
- Affiliated: Republican Party
- State attorneys general: 27 / 50
- Territorial attorneys general: 1 / 5
- Federal district attorneys general: 0 / 1

Website
- republicanags.com

Party affiliation of current United States attorneys general: Democratic (23 states, 1 territory (Note: Attorneys general in the Northern Mariana Islands are elected non-partisan; however, Edward Manibusan affiliates with the Democratic Party), and 1 district) Republican (27 states, 1 territory (Note: Attorneys general in Guam are elected non-partisan; however, Doug Moylan affiliates with the Republican Party)) Non-partisan (2 territories) New Progressive (1 territory)

The Republican Attorneys General Association (RAGA) is a United States national political advocacy group that focuses on electing Republicans as state attorneys general. Its Democratic counterpart is the Democratic Attorneys General Association.

== Operations ==
RAGA operated as an arm of the Republican State Leadership Committee until 2014, when RAGA was split off. In 2023, the largest donations came from the Concord Fund, with total donations from Concord since 2014 coming to $16.8 million. Since 2020 the group has received about $5.8 million in donations from the oil and gas industry.

== Controversy ==
RAGA operates The Rule of Law Defense Fund, which became the center of controversy following revelations that it had sponsored mass robocalls urging recipients to support President Donald Trump's rally in front of the Capitol on January 6; the rally resulted in the 2021 United States Capitol attack. The robocall did not advocate for violence or storming the Capitol complex.

Following the January 6 attack, donations to RAGA dropped significantly. The executive director of RAGA resigned less than a week after the robocall and attack. Chairman Christopher M. Carr, Georgia's attorney general, resigned in April 2021 as a result of the split within the group over the January 6 attack.

== See also ==
- Democratic Attorneys General Association
- State attorney general
