= Carol Thomas-Jacobs =

American lawyer

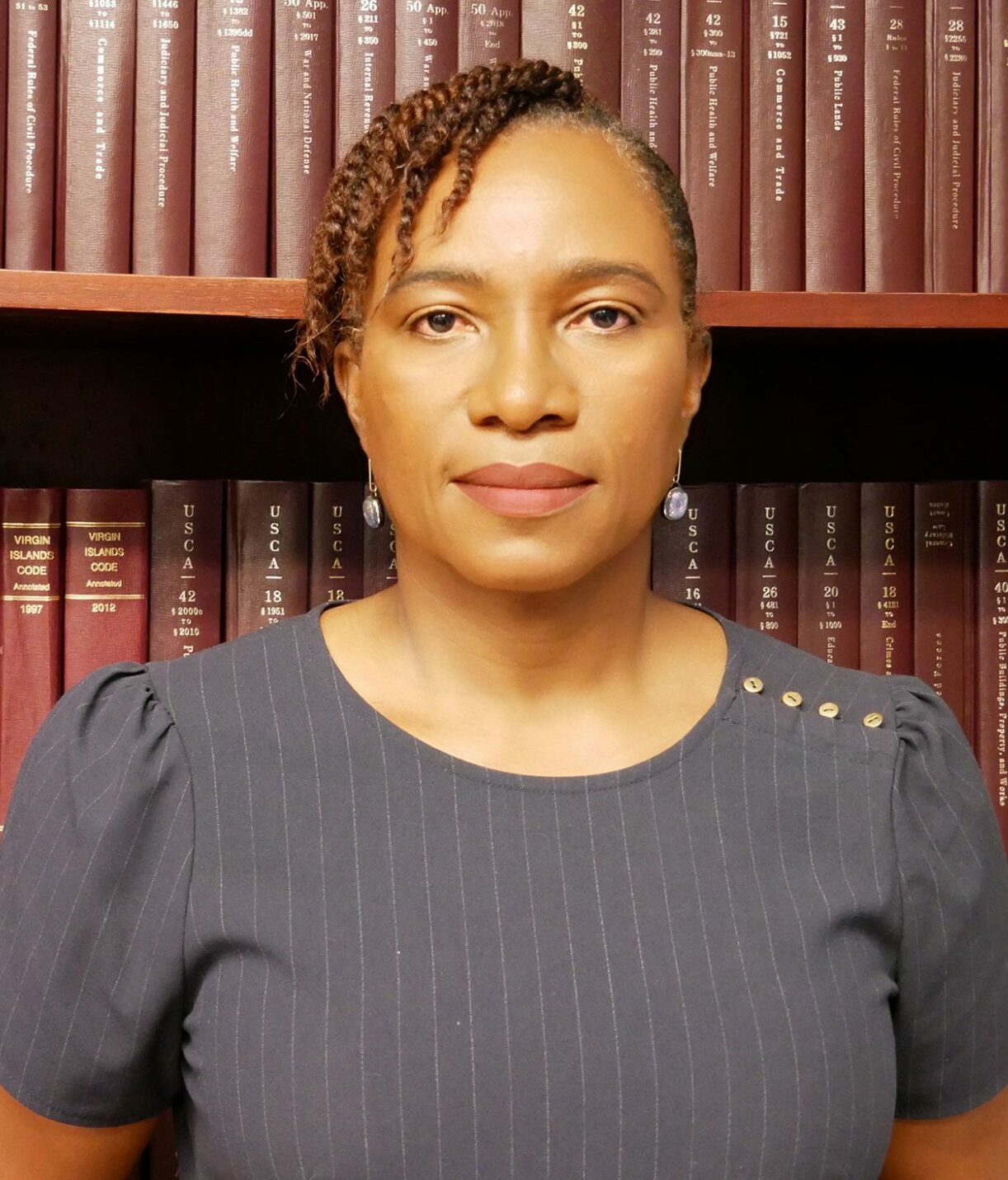

Attorney General of the United States Virgin Islands Acting
- In office January 1, 2023 – April 14, 2023
- Governor: Albert Bryan
- Preceded by: Denise George
- Succeeded by: Ariel K. Smith (acting)

Personal details
- Born: 1968 or 1969 (age 57–58) Antigua
- Education: University of the West Indies, Jamaica (JD)

Carol Thomas-Jacobs (1968/1969) is a judge on the United States Virgin Islands Superior Court. She was the acting Attorney General of the United States Virgin Islands from January to April 2023.

== Life ==
Thomas-Jacobs worked for the U.S. Virgin Islands Department of Justice for 20 years, first serving as an Assistant Attorney General in the Civil Division, then as head of the Civil Division. In 2016, she became deputy attorney general. She was promoted to chief deputy attorney general in 2020.

=== Acting Attorney General ===
She was appointed by Governor Albert Bryan to replace Denise George as the acting Attorney General of the United States Virgin Islands on January 1, 2023.

On January 20, 2023, Thomas-Jacobs executed a settlement agreement with billionaire Leon Black to resolve potential claims regarding his financial relationship with Jeffrey Epstein. Under the terms of the agreement, Black paid the U.S. Virgin Islands $62.5 million to be used for mental health and social services. In exchange, the agreement "irrevocably releases and forever discharges" Black from any claims related to Epstein, "whether known or unknown, suspected or unsuspected," for any events occurring prior to the execution of the deal.

During her tenure, Thomas-Jacobs also oversaw the territory's high-profile lawsuit against JPMorgan Chase, which had been filed by her predecessor days before Thomas-Jacobs took office. In January 2023, Thomas-Jacobs' office filed an amended complaint alleging that former bank executive Jes Staley had a "profound friendship" with Epstein and exchanged approximately 1,200 emails with him from his professional account. Thomas-Jacobs' office successfully opposed the bank's motion to dismiss the lawsuit; in March 2023, a federal judge ruled that the case could proceed to trial.

In February 2023, Thomas-Jacobs' office also sought to enforce subpoenas against billionaire Les Wexner, seeking documents regarding his financial ties to Epstein. Court filings indicate that process servers hired by her office were repeatedly blocked by security guards at Wexner's Ohio home and the Wexner Foundation while attempting to serve the subpoenas.

In addition to the Epstein-related litigation, Thomas-Jacobs oversaw the territory's local criminal prosecutions. In February 2023, her office filed a 16-count criminal information against Rodney Miller, the former CEO of the Schneider Regional Medical Center, charging him with embezzlement and falsification of public accounts following a retrial order by the Supreme Court. That same month, she announced the conviction of Oral Christopher Smith for first-degree murder in a 2018 domestic violence case.

In March 2023, Bryan nominated Thomas-Jacobs to the United States Virgin Islands Superior Court. She was confirmed to the superior court by the legislature on April 14, 2023. Thomas-Jacobs was succeeded by Ariel K. Smith.

== See also ==
- List of female state attorneys general in the United States
- List of minority attorneys general in the United States

Legal offices
Preceded by Denise George	Attorney General of the United States Virgin Islands; Acting; 2023	Succeeded by Ariel K. Smith; Acting
