= Lawrence J. Joseph =

American lawyer

Lawrence J. (Larry) Joseph is an American lawyer, known for his role in President Donald Trump's efforts to overturn the results of the 2020 United States presidential election. Since 2003, he has practiced in an independent law office, allowing him to take on cases he describes as "politically incorrect".

Joseph has filed a number of amicus curiae briefs in support of President Trump, including in cases involving Congressional subpoena of his tax returns. He has also filed briefs with the United States Supreme Court on behalf of APA Watch, of which he was an officer.

== Role in the 2020 Presidential election ==
In December 2020, Joseph was hired as a special counsel to Texas Attorney General Ken Paxton to author a lawsuit Texas v. Pennsylvania aimed at overturning election results in several other states.

The Supreme Court rejected the lawsuit, which was widely condemned including by Republican elected officials, a group of whom described it as "mak[ing] a mockery of federalism and separation of powers" in an amicus curiae brief.

In the same month, Joseph was named as attorney for the plaintiff in Gohmert v. Pence, another attempt to overturn the 2020 United States presidential election in favor of Donald Trump. The lawsuit was similarly dismissed by the United States District Court for the Eastern District of Texas, the United States Court of Appeals for the Fifth Circuit, and the Supreme Court.
