= Citrus County Detention Facility =

Jail in Lecanto, Florida, US

Coordinates: 28°50′42″N 82°28′36″W

- Interactive map of Citrus County Detention Facility
- Location: 2604 W. Woodland Ridge Drive Lecanto, Florida
- Status: open
- Security class: mixed
- Capacity: 760
- Opened: 1995
- Managed by: Corrections Corporation of America

The Citrus County Detention Facility is a privately operated jail located in Lecanto, Citrus County, Florida, run by the Corrections Corporation of America to house inmates for multiple jurisdictions: the county, the United States Virgin Islands Department of Justice, and the U.S. Marshals Service. The facility houses a maximum of 760 prisoners, both male and female, at mixed security levels.
