= Eli Whitney Debevoise =

American lawyer (1899–1990)

- Born: December 14, 1899
- Died: June 30, 1990 (aged 90)
- Education: Yale University (B.A. 1921); Harvard Law School (1925)
- Spouses: Barbara Clay Debevoise (div.), Agnes Holder Black Debevoise
- Relatives: Eli Whitney (great-grandfather); Thomas M. Debevoise (son)

Eli Whitney Debevoise (December 14, 1899 – June 30, 1990) was a New York lawyer who co-founded the law firm Debevoise & Plimpton and periodically served in a variety of high-profile government positions.

== Early life ==
Debevoise was born on December 14, 1899, in Manhattan, the son of Anne Farnam Whitney and Thomas McElrath Debevoise. He was named after his great-great grandfather, Eli Whitney, the inventor of the cotton gin.

He graduated from the Hotchkiss School in Lakeville, Conn., in 1917 and subsequently enlisted in the U.S. Army, eventually attaining the rank of second lieutenant.

== Legal career ==
He graduated from Yale University in 1921 and from Harvard Law School in 1925. After graduation, Debevoise immediately joined his father’s Manhattan law practice, but later became an associate at Davis Polk & Wardwell, a firm headed by John W. Davis, the Democratic candidate for president in 1924.

In 1931, Debevoise and William Stevenson, a fellow associate at Davis Polk & Wardwell, formed a partnership under the name Debevoise & Stevenson, which later became Debevoise & Plimpton, with a total of $2,366 in their account. They were soon joined by Francis Plimpton and, in 1936, Robert G. Page. The firm enjoyed early success as counsel to the trustee in the 1932 bankruptcy proceedings of Ivar Kreuger’s International Match Company. During World War II, Debevoise was chairman of the Alien Enemy Hearing Board in New York.

During the early 1950s, Debevoise had many high-profile cases and served in many prominent public positions. From 1951 to 1953, Debevoise served as Deputy High Commissioner for Germany and was general counsel to the Allied Commission that administered Germany’s affairs in the years after World War II.

After returning to the United States, Debevoise rejoined Debevoise & Plimpton and engaged in a variety of public service and human rights activities. Notably, he was a founder of the International Commission of Jurists, one of the first global human rights organizations. Debevoise also served as chairman of Governor Nelson Rockefeller’s Committee to Review New York Laws and Procedures on Human Rights and helped craft the final report that was delivered in March 1968.

Debevoise retired at the age of 87 and died at his home in Manhattan on June 30, 1990.

The Archives and Special Collections at Amherst College holds some of his papers.
