= Thomas M. Debevoise =

American attorney

Attorney General of Vermont
- In office February 2, 1960 – January 1, 1962
- Governor: Robert Stafford; F. Ray Keyser Jr.
- Preceded by: Frederick M. Reed
- Succeeded by: Charles J. Adams

Deputy Attorney General of Vermont
- In office January 2, 1959 – February 1, 1960
- Preceded by: Stephen B. Richardson
- Succeeded by: Arthur Crowley Jr.

Personal details
- Born: August 10, 1929; New York City, New York
- Died: February 1, 1995 (aged 65); Lebanon, New Hampshire
- Political party: Republican
- Spouse: Ann Taylor (m. 1951)
- Relations: Eli Whitney Debevoise (father)
- Children: 4 (including Whitney Debevoise)
- Education: Yale University; Columbia Law School
- Occupation: Attorney; Law School Dean

Thomas M. Debevoise (August 10, 1929 – February 1, 1995) was a Vermont attorney who served as Vermont Attorney General from 1960 to 1962.

== Biography ==
Thomas McElrath Debevoise 2d was born in New York City on August 10, 1929. He was the son of prominent attorney Eli Whitney Debevoise, and the grandson and namesake of Thomas M. Debevoise (1874-1958), who was the longtime attorney for John D. Rockefeller. He received a bachelor's degree from Yale University in 1950, and a law degree from Columbia Law School in 1954.

After attaining admission to the bar, Debevoise was an Assistant United States Attorney for the Southern District of New York from 1954 to 1956. He relocated to Woodstock, Vermont, and practiced law for two years before becoming Deputy Attorney General for the state of Vermont, a post he held from 1959 to 1960. While in private practice, he assisted James B. Donovan in the defense of accused spy Rudolf Abel.

In February 1960, Robert Stafford, the Governor of Vermont, appointed Debevoise to serve as state Attorney General, filling the vacancy caused when incumbent Frederick M. Reed resigned. Debevoise won election to a full term as a Republican in November 1960, and served until resigning in January 1962. He was succeeded by Charles J. Adams.

From 1962 to 1964, Debevoise was assistant general counsel for the Federal Power Commission. He then returned to the practice of law.

Debevoise was president of the Vermont Law School board of trustees from 1973 to 1974, and Dean of the school from 1974 to 1982. He became Dean Emeritus in 1982, and served as trustee emeritus from 1983 to 1995. In 1984 Vermont Law School awarded him the honorary degree of Doctor of Laws.

Debevoise was president of the Woodstock Foundation from 1982 to 1995; this organization was founded by Laurance Rockefeller and Mary French Rockefeller to promote conservation and sustainable land use. He was also involved in several civic causes.

Debevoise died from the effects of lung cancer at the Dartmouth-Hitchcock Medical Center in Lebanon, New Hampshire on February 1, 1995.

== Family ==
Debevoise was married to Ann Taylor Debevoise. They were the parents of son Thomas 3rd, daughter Anne, and sons Whitney and Clay.

== Legacy ==
Debevoise Hall, a building renovated in 2005 and added to the Vermont Law School facility, was named for Thomas M. and Ann Debevoise.

Party political offices
Preceded by Frederick M. Reed	Republican nominee for Vermont Attorney General; 1960	Succeeded by Charles E. Gibson Jr.
Legal offices
Preceded by Frederick M. Reed	Attorney General of Vermont; 1960–1962	Succeeded by Charles J. Adams
