= United States Virgin Islands Department of Justice =

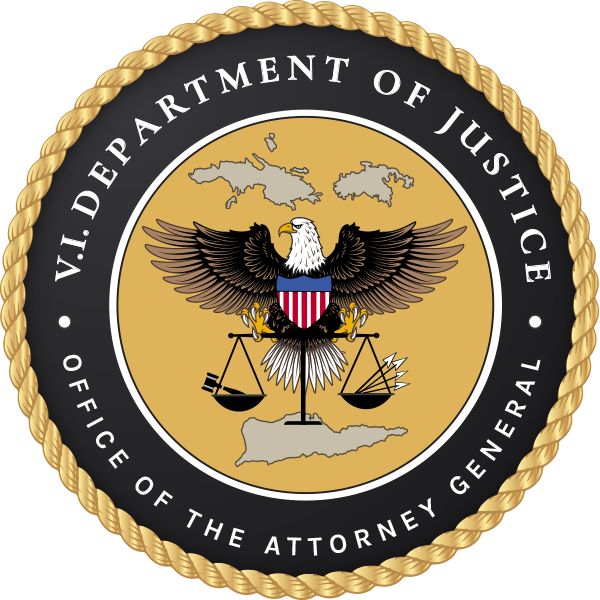
- Seal

Agency overview
- Employees: 134

Jurisdictional structure
- Map showing jurisdictional area
- Legal jurisdiction: United States Virgin Islands

Operational structure
- Headquarters: Saint Thomas, U.S. Virgin Islands, US
- Agency executive: Ariel K. Smith, Attorney General of the United States Virgin Islands
- Parent agency: Office of the Attorney General

Website
- usvidoj.com

The United States Virgin Islands Department of Justice is a department of the United States Virgin Islands government.

== Corrections ==
The Virgin Islands Bureau of Corrections (BOC) operates the territory's correctional facilities.

The Bureau of Corrections maintains a facility in Saint Croix, the John A. Bell Adult Correctional Facility (formerly named Golden Grove). As of October 1, 2014, 132 sentenced prisoners and 136 non-sentenced prisoners are at Golden Grove. The bureau also maintains jails on the island of St. Thomas: those in the Alexander Farrelly Criminal Justice Complex (CJC) and the Alva A. Swan Annex.

As of 2016 the BOC does not have a specific correctional officer training program, and instead has the police department train prison guards.

=== Corrections history ===
In 2014 the U.S. Department of Justice asked a federal judge to force the USVI authorities to improve conditions at Golden Grove. Prior to October 1, 2014, due to staffing shortages at Golden Grove, 78 adult prisoners, including 75 sentenced prisoners at Golden Grove and three held at the St. Thomas Jails who were deemed by prison authorities as "behavioral and management concerns", were transferred to the privately operated Citrus County Detention Facility in Citrus County, Florida.

Circa 2013 USVI authorities stated that they were going to improve conditions at the St. Thomas jails, but a 2015 report from David Bogard, a security analysis, stated that the level of staffing since October 2014 had deteriorated.
