= Eli Whitney Debevoise II =

Eli Whitney Debevoise II (born February 8, 1953) is a former U.S. Executive Director of the World Bank Group, where his tenure lasted from April 6, 2007, to 2009. He is also a partner at Arnold & Porter LLP and served as Commissioner of the Maryland Port Commission in Baltimore.

== Biography ==
Whitney Debevoise was born in Morristown, New Jersey, in 1953, the son of Thomas M. Debevoise and Ann Taylor Debevoise. He graduated from the St. Albans School in Washington, D.C., in 1970. He graduated in 1974 from Yale University (where he was a member of Manuscript Society), with departmental honors in History and Latin American Studies, and received a J.D. from Harvard Law School in 1977.

== Career ==
=== Judicial clerkship ===
After graduating from Harvard Law School, Debevoise clerked for the Hon. William J. Holloway, Jr., of the United States Court of Appeals for the Tenth Circuit in 1978 through 1979.

=== Private practice ===
Debevoise started at Arnold & Porter, LLP as an associate in 1979 and practiced as a partner from 1986 to 2007. During this time, he increasingly specialized in international financial transactions, banking and international trade. While in private practice, Whitney Debevoise represented the central banks and finance ministries of many countries, as well as the Bank for International Settlements, the World Bank, the African Development Bank and the Inter-American Development Bank. Debevoise has been involved in transactions ranging from Brazil's $49 billion Brady Plan exercise to numerous Yankee bond, Samurai bond, and Eurobond issuances in ten different currencies. He was involved with billion dollar equity placements of shares in firms, such as Telfonica Argentina, Companhia Vale do Rio Doce (CVRD), Petroleo Brasileiro SA (Petrobras), and Unibanco-Uniao de Bancos Brasileiros. For his efforts, Brazil awarded Debevoise the Order of Rio Branco in 1997, which recognizes Brazilian and "foreign individuals" who have significantly contributed to the promotion of Brazil's international relations.

Debevoise also handled cases in the General Agreement on Tariffs and Trade (GATT) and World Trade Organization dispute settlement mechanism and at the International Centre for Settlement of Investment Disputes, including cases establishing rulings on the allocation of arbitral expenses and attorney's fees.
