= Kerry Drue =

Kerry Drue is the former Attorney General of the United States Virgin Islands. After being confirmed in September 2005, Drue resigned in January, 2007. Prior to becoming attorney general, Drue served as the head of the civil division for the Justice Department of the USVI.

== Education ==
- J.D., Harvard Law School, 1991
- B.A., Princeton University, 1988
