= Denise George =

American lawyer

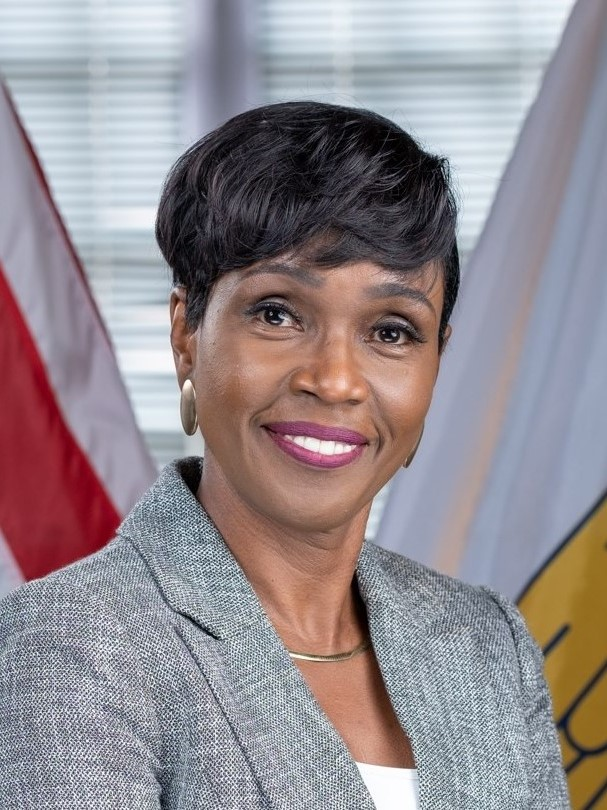
- George in 2019.

18th Attorney General of the United States Virgin Islands
- In office May 14, 2019 – January 1, 2023
- Governor: Albert Bryan
- Preceded by: Claude Walker
- Succeeded by: Carol Thomas-Jacobs (acting)

Personal details
- Born: August 10, 1959 (age 66) Saint Thomas, U.S. Virgin Islands
- Education: University of Maryland, College Park (BA); Howard University (JD)

Denise N. George, also known as Denise George-Counts, is a U.S. Virgin Islands lawyer and former television news reporter who served as the Attorney General of the United States Virgin Islands. She completed a Bachelor of Arts degree in radio, television, and film at the University of Maryland, College Park. George completed a Juris Doctor degree from Howard University School of Law in 1984.

== Career ==
George began her professional life as a television news reporter and desk anchor for a local station in St. Thomas before pursuing a legal career. After graduating from law school, she served as a judicial law clerk and eventually joined the Virgin Islands Department of Justice, where she worked for over 18 years. She served for more than ten years as the Director of the White-Collar Crime and Public Corruption Division, where she successfully prosecuted high-ranking officials for embezzlement, fraud, and racketeering.

In May 2019, George was appointed Attorney General of the United States Virgin Islands by Governor Albert Bryan. During her tenure, she secured a $105 million settlement from the estate of Jeffrey Epstein, which remains the largest monetary settlement in the history of the territory. The agreement included the forfeiture of Epstein's private islands, Little Saint James and Great Saint James, to be sold with proceeds benefiting survivors of human trafficking.

On December 27, 2022, George filed a lawsuit against JPMorgan Chase in Manhattan federal court, alleging that the bank knowingly facilitated and concealed Jeffrey Epstein's sex-trafficking operation. Four days later, on December 31, 2022, Governor Albert Bryan terminated George from her position, later stating he was "blindsided" by the lawsuit and asserted it was filed without his prior consultation.

In January 2026, details regarding George's termination were further clarified in a four-page FBI interview memorandum released by the federal government. George alleged that shortly after her 2019 appointment, Governor Bryan personally pressured her to grant Epstein a waiver from a 21-day travel reporting requirement for registered sex offenders, texting her that she "needed to make a decision on the Epstein matter." George refused the request, citing the need to protect the community.

George also stated to investigators that Governor Bryan had expressed anger over her expansion of the investigation and the lawsuit against JPMorgan Chase. According to her account, the Governor accused her of "going after people who are members of our team" and instructed her to settle the estate litigation for $80 million, a lower amount than she ultimately secured, stating that the estate "just wanted to clear people" involved. She was succeeded by Acting Attorney General Carol Thomas-Jacobs.

Legal offices
Preceded by Claude Walker	Attorney General of the United States Virgin Islands; 2019–2023	Succeeded by Carol Thomas-Jacobs; Acting
