= Charity Clark =

American politician (born 1975)

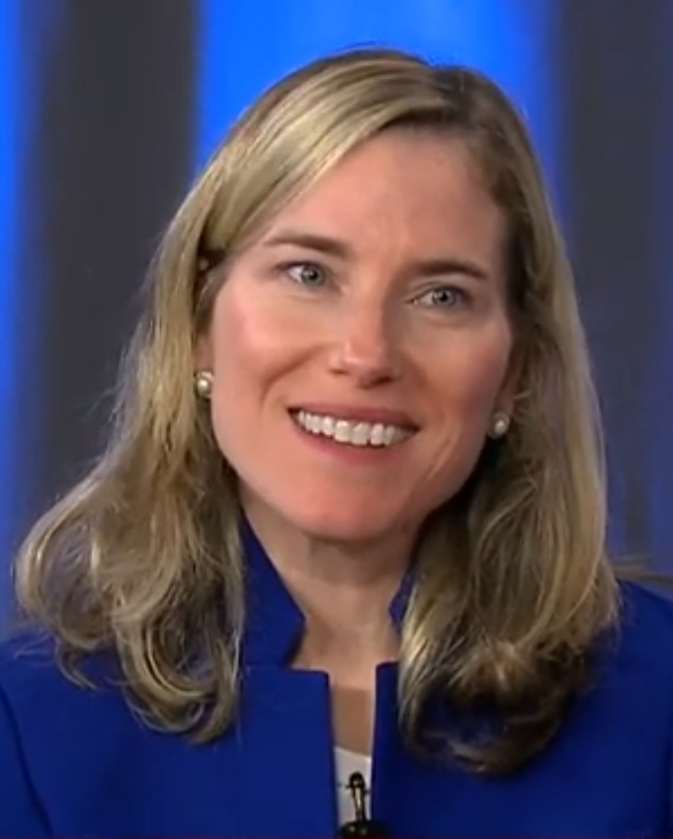
- Clark in 2022

28th Attorney General of Vermont
- Incumbent
- Assumed office January 5, 2023
- Governor: Phil Scott
- Preceded by: Susanne Young

Personal details
- Born: Charity Rae Clark; July 15, 1975 (age 51) Springfield, Vermont, U.S.
- Party: Democratic
- Spouse: Robert Lietar (divorced)
- Children: 1
- Education: University of Vermont (BA); Boston College (JD)

Charity Rae Clark (born July 15, 1975) is an American lawyer and politician from Vermont. A member of the Democratic Party, she has served as Vermont Attorney General since January 2023.

== Early life and career ==
Charity Rae Clark was born in Springfield, Vermont on July 15, 1975. She was raised in Manchester, Vermont and resides in Williston, Vermont. She is a descendant of Thomas Chittenden, the first governor of Vermont. Her father, Marshall Clark, owned a supermarket in Londonderry, Vermont. Her mother, Melody MacGinnis Reed, was executive director of the non-profit arts organization Gallery at the VAULT in Springfield. Clark graduated from Burr and Burton Seminary in 1993. Her siblings include a twin sister, Chelsea. She earned her Bachelor of Arts degree in political science from the University of Vermont in 1997 and served as a policy analyst in the administration of Governor Howard Dean. She then enrolled at Boston College Law School, earning her Juris Doctor degree in 2005.

After passing the bar, Clark joined the Burlington, Vermont firm of Downs, Rachlin Martin as an associate attorney. She later worked in New York City, where she was an attorney with the firm of Orrick, Herrington & Sutcliffe.

In 2014, William Sorrell, then the attorney general of Vermont, hired Clark as an assistant attorney general. She served as the chief of staff to T. J. Donovan for four years while Donovan served as attorney general. She resigned in May 2022.

== Attorney general of Vermont ==
The week after resigning as Donovan's chief of staff, Clark announced her candidacy for state attorney general in the 2022 Vermont Attorney General election, as Donovan was not seeking reelection. (Note: Donovan resigned in June and the governor appointed Susanne Young to replace him. Young was not a candidate for a full term.) Clark defeated Rory Thibault, the states attorney for Washington County, in the Democratic Party primary election, 58% to 28%. In the November 8 general election, she faced Republican Mike Tagliavia, a first-time candidate who is not an attorney, and won the election with 65% of the vote, becoming the first woman ever elected Attorney General of Vermont. In 2024, Clark was reelected.

== Personal life ==
In May 2011, Clark married Robert Lietar, a television producer and documentary filmmaker. Their ceremony took place at Hildene, the Robert Todd Lincoln home in Manchester, Vermont. They later divorced, and are the parents of a daughter.

== Notes ==
Party political offices
Preceded by T. J. Donovan	Democratic nominee for Attorney General of Vermont; 2022, 2024, 2026	Most recent
Legal offices
Preceded by Susanne Young	Attorney General of Vermont; 2023–present	Incumbent
