= William Sorrell =

American politician

Bill Sorrell

25th Attorney General of Vermont
- In office May 1, 1997 – January 5, 2017
- Governor: Howard Dean; Jim Douglas; Peter Shumlin
- Preceded by: Jeffrey Amestoy
- Succeeded by: T. J. Donovan

Vermont Secretary of Administration
- In office September 1992 – May 1, 1997
- Governor: Howard Dean
- Preceded by: David Wilson
- Succeeded by: Kathy Hoyt

Personal details
- Born: March 9, 1947 (age 79) Burlington, Vermont, U.S.
- Party: Democratic
- Parent: Thomas W. Sorrell (father)
- Education: University of Notre Dame (BA); Cornell University (JD)

William H. Sorrell (born March 9, 1947) is an American lawyer and politician. He is the longest-serving attorney general in the history of the U.S. state of Vermont, holding the position for 20 years. Originally appointed by Governor Howard Dean in 1997, he was reelected nine times: in 1998, 2000, 2002, 2004, 2006, 2008, 2010, 2012, and 2014. During his last election, he defeated primary challenger TJ Donovan by a very narrow margin. He did not run for re-election in 2016, and was succeeded by Donovan in January 2017.

== Early life ==
A native of Burlington, Vermont, Sorrell is the son of Thomas W. Sorrell, who served as U.S. Marshal for Vermont, and Esther (née Hartigan) Sorrell, a longtime Democratic Party activist and member of the Vermont Senate. He received his Bachelor of Arts, magna cum laude, in 1970 from the University of Notre Dame, then earned his Juris Doctor from Cornell Law School in 1974.

== Early career ==
Sorrell was Chittenden County Deputy State's Attorney in 1975–1977, then Chittenden County State's Attorney from 1977 to 1978. After working in private law practice at McNeil, Murray & Sorrell from 1978 to 1989, he returned to being State's Attorney from 1989 to 1992, then served as Vermont's Secretary of Administration from 1992 to 1997 until his appointment as Vermont Attorney General.

== Attorney general ==
=== Tobacco litigation ===
Within weeks of taking office, Sorrell joined a suit against the nation's largest tobacco companies to end their deceitful behavior of lying about the harmful effects of their products.

The lawsuit resulted in a historic national settlement with Big Tobacco that to date has yielded over $300 million for Vermont taxpayers; and, as a result Big Tobacco will continue to pay Vermont approximately $25 million a year in perpetuity.

Sorrell also successfully stopped Big Tobacco's attempt to include cigarette advertising in national magazines sent to Vermont school children and scored a resounding victory against RJ Reynolds in a closely watched lawsuit attacking the marketing of the company's so-called "reduced risk" cigarettes.

=== Environmental protection ===
During Sorrell's tenure, Vermont became a national leader in anti-pollution efforts.

Sorrell joined litigation against American Electric Power, a major contributor to acid rain problems in Vermont and other states in the region. The settlement of the case is the largest settlement of an environmental pollution case in US history.

Sorrell successfully defended Vermont's strict auto-emission standards (the so-called "California Standard") against pushback from the national auto industry. The verdict was a success for the cause of reversing the adverse effects global warming and increasing the fuel economy of motor vehicles.

== Other accomplishments ==
In June 2004, Sorrell began a one-year term as president of the National Association of Attorneys General (NAAG), and in June 2003 he was chosen by his fellow attorneys general to receive NAAG's Kelley–Wyman Award, given annually to the "Outstanding Attorney General."

Sorrell served a maximum term of six years as a member and then chair of the board of the American Legacy Foundation. In appreciation for his service, in 2008 the foundation endowed the William H. Sorrell Lecture Series, funding an annual address on tobacco control issues at a NAAG meeting.

He has served as a member of Vermont's Judicial Nominating Board, as president of United Cerebral Palsy of Vermont, secretary of the Vermont Coalition of the Handicapped and a member of the board of the Winooski Valley Park District. He currently serves as chair of the board of the NAAG Mission Foundation.

Sorrell was recognized by the Coalition for a Tobacco Free Vermont as Tobacco Control Champion in 2003, and in 2009 as Citizen of the Year by the Vermont Medical Society and in 2010 by the National Humane Society with its Humane Law Enforcement Award.

=== Allegations of corruption ===
Sorrell has been accused of burying sensitive investigations and covering up criminal acts committed by persons or institutions with influence in Vermont. He is alleged to have covered up biological terrorism relating to the intentional infection of a series of patients at Northwestern Medical Center of St. Albans, VT. Sorrell has steadfastly maintained that his office investigated the apparent act of biological terrorism and found no evidence of wrongdoing. However, when his investigative files were subpoenaed, no evidence was found that any investigation ever took place. Sorrell's office claimed it had no records other than a few superficial interviews.

On January 27, 2016, Vermont independent newspaper Seven Days reported that Vermont State Police had "received a complaint of alleged criminal misconduct" from a panel of state's attorneys charged with investigating six allegations against Sorrell".

== Vermont elections ==
Year	Office	Incumbent	Party	Votes	Pct	Challenger	Party	Votes	Pct
1998	VT Attorney General, general election	Bill Sorrell	Democratic	169,239	83.8%	Sandy Ward	Vermont Grassroots	17,954	8.9
2000	VT Attorney General, general election	Bill Sorrell	Democratic	226,668	83.9%	Sandy Ward	Vermont Grassroots	39,713	14.7%
2002	VT Attorney General, general election	Bill Sorrell	Democratic	125,495	56.6%	Larry Drown	Republican	67,360	30.4%
2004	VT Attorney General, general election	Bill Sorrell	Democratic	169,726	57.9%	Dennis Carver	Republican	90,285	30.8%
2006	VT Attorney General, general election	Bill Sorrell	Democratic	173,467	69.3%	Dennis Carver	Republican	67,721	27.0%
2008	VT Attorney General, general election	Bill Sorrell	Democratic	214,980	72.6%	Karen Kerin	Republican	55,268	18.6%
2010	VT Attorney General, general election	Bill Sorrell	Democratic	143,031	61.9%	Aaron Michael Toscano	Republican	67,900	29.4%
2012	VT Attorney General, Democratic primary	Bill Sorrell	Democratic	21,124	50.8%	T.J. Donovan	Democratic	20,410	49.1%
2012	VT Attorney General, general election	Bill Sorrell	Democratic	164,441	57.9%	Jack McMullen	Republican	94,588	33.3%
2014	VT Attorney General, general election	Bill Sorrell	Democratic	109,305	58.6%	Shane McCormack	Republican	69,489	37.3%

Party political offices
Preceded by Jeffrey Amestoy	Democratic nominee for Vermont Attorney General; 1998, 2000, 2002, 2004, 2006, 2008, 2010, 2012, 2014	Succeeded by T. J. Donovan
Preceded by Jeffrey Amestoy	Republican nominee for Vermont Attorney General; 1998, 2000	Succeeded by Larry Drown
Legal offices
Preceded by Jeffrey Amestoy	Attorney General of Vermont; 1997–2017	Succeeded by T. J. Donovan
