= T. J. Donovan =

American lawyer and politician

26th Attorney General of Vermont
- In office January 5, 2017 – June 20, 2022
- Governor: Phil Scott
- Preceded by: Bill Sorrell
- Succeeded by: Josh Diamond (Acting)

State's Attorney of Chittenden County
- In office January 11, 2007 – January 3, 2017
- Preceded by: Bob Simpson
- Succeeded by: Sarah George

Personal details
- Born: January 15, 1974 (age 52) Burlington, Vermont, U.S.
- Party: Democratic
- Spouse: Jessica McCloud
- Children: 2
- Education: Merrimack College (BA); Suffolk University (JD)
- Website: Campaign website

Thomas J. "T. J." Donovan Jr. (born January 15, 1974) is an American lawyer and politician who served as Vermont Attorney General from 2017 to 2022. He was first elected in 2016 with over 66 percent of the vote. He previously served for ten years as State's Attorney of Chittenden County, the most populous county in Vermont.

Donovan is known for starting the Rapid Intervention Community Court (RICC) in Chittenden County, a criminal justice program made available to non-violent offenders whose crimes have been driven by addiction or mental illness.

During his first month in office, Attorney General Donovan joined sixteen other states in an amicus brief in the Ninth Circuit Court of Appeals. The brief opposes President Trump's executive order banning on immigrants from certain Muslim countries. Donovan also joined Republican Governor Phil Scott in proposing legislation to require the governor's approval before state and local police could conduct federal immigration enforcement work.

A member of the Democratic Party, Donovan challenged incumbent Vermont attorney general William Sorrell for the Democratic nomination to become the Vermont Attorney General in the elections of 2012. His campaign that year was centered on the prescription drug abuse epidemic throughout Vermont, and resulted in a very narrow primary defeat. In 2014, he ran for re-election as state's attorney of Chittenden County, choosing not to challenge Sorrell a second time.

== Early life and family ==
Donovan was born in Burlington, Vermont in 1974. He is one of six children born to attorney Thomas J. Donovan (deceased) and Johannah Leddy Donovan, a member of the Vermont House of Representatives. He is the grandson of Bernard Joseph Leddy (March 18, 1910 – January 9, 1972) a United States federal judge. Donovan graduated from Burlington High School in 1992 and attended Merrimack College, graduating with a degree in political science in 1996. He graduated from Suffolk Law School in 2000. Donovan is married to Jessica McCloud. The couple has two children.

During his 2012 campaign for Vermont Attorney General, Donovan acknowledged his arrest for assault as a teenager. In a plea bargain, the charge was reduced to a misdemeanor, and Donovan received a deferred sentence. His record was expunged after he completed the terms of his plea agreement. Donovan pointed to this experience as a critical moment in his personal development, when began to act more maturely and think about his future. He also detailed the advantages he had in dealing with the criminal justice system as the son of an attorney, which might not have been available to a similarly situated teenager living in poverty with fewer personal, professional, and political connections. He described this incident as instructive, stating that it guided him to a sense of empathy and obligation to help others navigate the criminal justice system and receive a second chance when circumstances warrant.

== Early career ==
Donovan began his legal career in the District Attorney's Office of Philadelphia, Pennsylvania, as a criminal prosecutor. Donovan returned to Vermont in 2002, working as a Deputy State's Attorney in Chittenden County. He left to become an associate at the Burlington law firm of Jarvis & Kaplan, where he focused on criminal defense, civil litigation, and family matters. In 2006, after winning a three-way Democratic primary, Donovan was elected Chittenden County State's Attorney. The Chittenden County State's Attorney's Office is the busiest county prosecutor's office in the state of Vermont, handling over 5000 criminal cases and 300 Family Court cases annually. There, Donovan led a staff of 28, including, attorneys, victim advocates, and administrative assistants. Donovan was re-elected in 2010 and 2014.

In 2010, Donovan started the Rapid Intervention Community Court ("RICC"), an award-winning criminal justice program made available to non-violent offenders whose crimes have been driven by addiction or mental illness. He is co-chair of former Vermont governor Peter Shumlin's Criminal Justice and Substance Abuse Cabinet.

== Political career ==
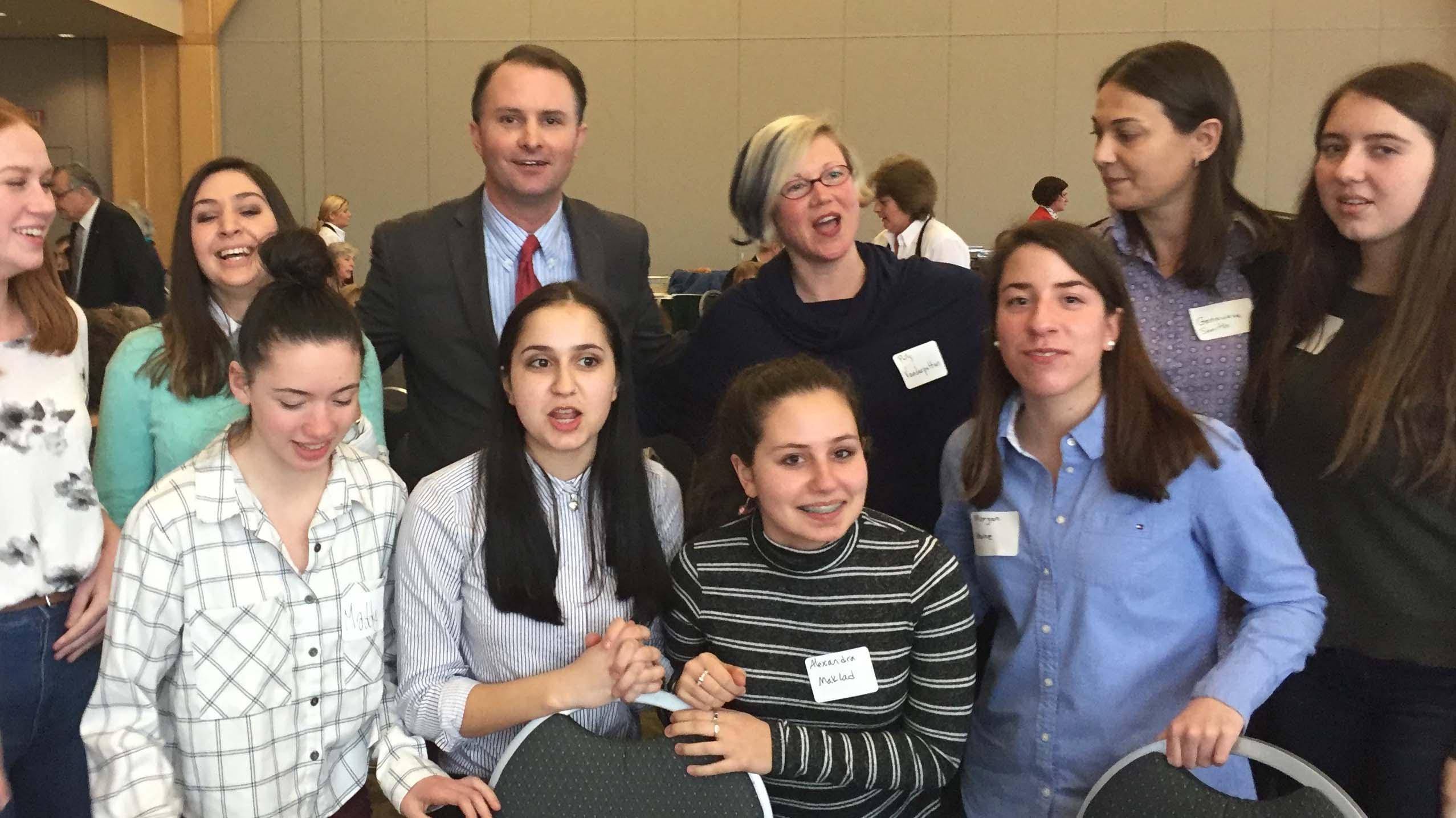
Donovan at Canadian Heritage Conference, UVM, March 20, 2017

In 2012, Donovan challenged incumbent Vermont Attorney General William Sorrell in the Democratic Party primary. Donovan campaigned, among other things, for access under the Access to Public Records Act to police investigations and the decriminalization of small amounts of marijuana. One of his focuses in the campaign was to highlight the opioid epidemic afflicting Vermont communities. Donovan lost the hotly contested primary by 714 votes, with Sorrell receiving 21,124 votes to Donovan's 20,410. During the last weeks of the primary, a super PAC with unknown donors ran advertisements for the incumbent narrated by former Governor Howard Dean.

Several of the principal issues that Donovan advocated in the 2012 campaign were enacted into law in the next Legislative session, including access to records of police investigations, a Good Samaritan law to help prevent fatal opiate overdoses and decriminalization of small amounts of marijuana. In March 2014, Donovan was reelected as Chittenden County State's Attorney, running unopposed. While his office prosecuted many violent felonies, he also worked to reduce recidivism and, where appropriate, utilized a collaborative approach to addressing criminality. In February 2015, Donovan announced a traffic-ticket amnesty program to allow persons with suspended licenses to pay each unpaid traffic ticket for $20 in a one-day trial. On March 20, 2015, more than a thousand people lined up outside the Edward Costello Courthouse in Burlington to recover their driver's licenses. A similar program was offered in other counties and, in 2016, the legislature passed a law to allow such programs statewide.

On October 15, 2015, Donovan announced his candidacy for Vermont Attorney General in the 2016 election. He won the November 2016 general election by defeating Republican nominee Deborah Bucknam.

On July 23, 2019, he officially endorsed Bernie Sanders' presidential campaign.

Donovan announced on May 5, 2022 that he would not seek reelection as Attorney General. The following month, he announced that he would resign as Attorney General effective June 20 to become Director of Public Policy and U.S. State Strategies at Roblox Corporation.

== Political positions ==
While Donovan has focused on prosecuting serious crime, and particularly violent crime, he has attempted an innovative approach to persons struggling with addiction and poverty who end up in the criminal justice system. Donovan has focused on ultimate outcomes not only for the victims of crime but for the perpetrators in order to reduce recidivism and rehabilitate offenders. Donovan often summarized his approach by stating he believes that "the best form of public safety is a good job."

In his October 2015 announcement for the Democratic Party nomination for Vermont Attorney General, Donovan called for the abolition of the use of private prisons in Vermont. He stated, "No more private prisons. End the contracts with the for-profit companies ... and bring the Vermonters home. This is a moral test of our generation in this state." As of that time, approximately 271 male incarcerated persons from Vermont were housed in a private prison in Baldwin, Michigan, operated by GEO, Inc. A month later, the Vermont Commissioner of Corrections Lisa Menard said that she wanted to "substantially reduce, hopefully eliminate, usage of out-of-state beds. That keeps Vermont inmates and Vermont dollars in Vermont."

Donovan has worked to reduce recidivism on lesser crimes by trying to address the causes of criminality, prevention and collaborative solutions. For Vermonters struggling with drug addiction, he has sought alternatives to incarceration, noting that Vermont spends more on incarceration than on higher education, and that housing is a major problem. His efforts include advocating for medical treatment on demand for drug addiction, alternatives to incarceration and vigorous enforcement coupled with meaningful intervention and effective prevention strategies.

Donovan has also sought to enhance communication among law enforcement and the mental health community. He advocated for passage of "ban the box" legislation to prevent employers from inquiring about criminal history on initial job applications. After passing the legislature with overwhelming support, Vermont governor Peter Shumlin signed the bill into law on May 3, 2016.

== Electoral history ==
Chittenden County State's Attorney General Election, 2006
Party	Candidate	Votes	%
Democratic	TJ Donovan	37,497	60.7
Republican	John St. Francis	21,439	34.7
Independent	Paul Charles Duprat	2,853	4.6

Chittenden County State's Attorney Democratic Primary Election, 2010
Party	Candidate	Votes	%
Democratic	TJ Donovan	14,288	99.7
Democratic	Write-ins	41	0.3

Chittenden County State's Attorney General Election, 2010
Party	Candidate	Votes	%
Democratic	TJ Donovan	48,019	88.8
Republican	Paul Charles Duprat	6,086	11.2

Attorney General Democratic Primary Election, 2012
Party	Candidate	Votes	%
Democratic	TJ Donovan	20,410	49.1%
Democratic	William Sorrell	21,124	50.8%
Democratic	Write-ins	66	0.2%

Chittenden County State's Attorney Democratic Primary, 2014
Party	Candidate	Votes	%
Democratic	TJ Donovan	3,913	100.0

Chittenden County State's Attorney General Election, 2014
Party	Candidate	Votes	%
Democratic	TJ Donovan	39,078	100.0

Attorney General Democratic Primary Election, 2016
Party	Candidate	Votes	%
Democratic	TJ Donovan	49,017	80.2%
Democratic	H. Brooke Paige	11,917	19.5%
Democratic	Write-ins	214	0.3%

Attorney General General Election Unofficial Results, 2016
Party	Candidate	Votes	%
Democratic	TJ Donovan	200,020	66.6%
Republican	Deborah "Deb" Bucknam	88,431	29.4%
Liberty Union	Rosemarie Jackowski	11,844	3.9%

Attorney General General Election Results, 2018
Party	Candidate	Votes	%
Democratic	TJ Donovan	187,093	67.2%
Republican	Janssen Willhoit	70,226	25.2%
Liberty Union	Rosemarie Jackowski	9,536	3.4%

Attorney General General Election Results, 2020
Party	Candidate	Votes	%
Democratic	TJ Donovan	234,081	63.1%
Republican	H. Brooke Paige	94,892	25.6%
Progressive	Cris Ericson	15,846	4.3%

Party political offices
Preceded by William Sorrell	Democratic nominee for Vermont Attorney General; 2016, 2018, 2020	Succeeded by Charity Clark
Legal offices
Preceded by Bill Sorrell	Attorney General of Vermont; 2017–2022	Succeeded by Josh Diamond; Acting
