= Vermont Attorney General =

Attorney general for the U.S. state of Vermont

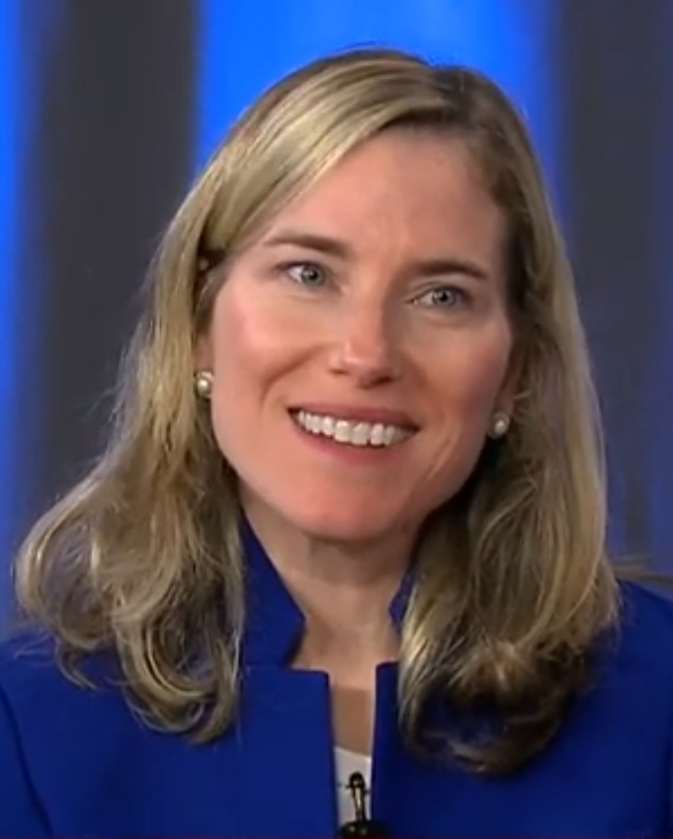
- Incumbent; Charity Clark since 2023
- Term length: Two years
- Formation: 1790
- First holder: Samuel Hitchcock
- Website: https://ago.vermont.gov/about-attorney-generals-office

The Vermont attorney general is a statewide elected executive official in the U.S. state of Vermont who is elected every two years. It was created by an act of the Vermont General Assembly in 1790, repealed in 1797, and revived in 1904. The office began as a one-person operation located at Windsor, Vermont, the state's first capital. When the position was recreated in 1904 offices were located in the Vermont State House. The office is now headquartered in the Pavilion and is the largest employer of attorneys in the state. As of January 5, 2023, Charity Clark is the Vermont attorney general, having been elected in 2022.

The office provides legal counsel for all state agencies and the Vermont General Assembly, the state's legislative branch. It handles civil and criminal cases in all courts of the state for both the trial and appellate levels. It defends the state when it is sued and files suits to enforce Vermont’s criminal, environmental, consumer protection, civil rights and other laws.

== Election ==
The attorney general was originally chosen by a vote of the Vermont General Assembly. Since 1908 the attorney general has been elected every two years at the same time and in the same manner as other statewide elected officials.

== List of Vermont attorneys general ==
#	Image	Name	Term of office	Political party
1		Samuel Hitchcock	1790–1793	Federalist
2		Daniel Buck	1793–1795	Federalist
Office vacant (1795–1797)
Office abolished (1797–1904)
3		Clarke C. Fitts	1904–1908	Republican
4		John G. Sargent	1908–1912	Republican
5		Rufus E. Brown	1912–1914	Republican
6		Herbert G. Barber	1914–1919	Republican
7		Frank Archibald	1919–1925	Republican
8		J. Ward Carver	1925–1931	Republican
9		Lawrence C. Jones	1931–1941	Republican
10		Alban J. Parker	1941–1947	Republican
11		Clifton G. Parker	1947–1952	Republican
12		F. Elliott Barber Jr.	1952–1955	Republican
13		Robert T. Stafford	1955–1957	Republican
14		Frederick M. Reed	1957–1960	Republican
15		Thomas M. Debevoise	1960–1962	Republican
16		Charles Adams	1962–1963	Republican
17		Charles E. Gibson Jr.	1963–1965	Republican
18		John P. Connarn	1965–1967	Democratic
19		James L. Oakes	1967–1969	Republican
20		Jim Jeffords	1969–1973	Republican
21		Kimberly B. Cheney	1973–1975	Republican
22		M. Jerome Diamond	1975–1981	Democratic
23		John J. Easton Jr.	1981–1985	Republican
24		Jeffrey L. Amestoy	1985–1997	Republican
25		Bill Sorrell	1997–2017	Democratic
26		T. J. Donovan	2017–2022	Democratic
–		Josh Diamond (Acting)	2022	Democratic
27		Susanne Young	2022–2023	Republican
28		Charity Clark	2023–present	Democratic
