= Jane Wheel =

American lay judge and central figure in the 1980s Vermont judicial ethics scandal

Jane L. Wheel

Assistant Judge of the Chittenden County Superior Court
- In office 1975 – January 1987

Personal details
- Born: Beverly Jane Lavilette; July 11, 1932 Burlington, Vermont, U.S.
- Died: March 26, 2017 (aged 84) Colchester, Vermont, U.S.
- Party: Democratic
- Spouse: Malcolm J. Wheel (m. 1951)
- Children: 3
- Education: Cathedral High School (Burlington, Vermont)
- Occupation: Assistant (side) judge; president, Vermont Assistant Judges Association
- Known for: Central figure in the 1985–1989 Vermont judicial ethics scandal

Jane L. Wheel (née Lavilette; July 11, 1932 – March 2017), born Beverly Jane Lavilette, was an American assistant judge (also called a side judge or lay judge) of the Chittenden County Superior Court in Vermont, serving from 1975 to 1987. She became the central figure in a judicial ethics scandal in the mid-to-late 1980s that led to her conviction on false-swearing charges — the first felony conviction of a sitting or former Vermont judge — and an unprecedented conduct investigation into three Vermont Supreme Court justices.

Wheel was convicted in 1988 on three counts of false swearing arising from a state investigation into padded pay vouchers, and served a short jail term. The scandal also led to disciplinary proceedings against Justices William C. Hill, Thomas L. Hayes, and Ernest W. Gibson III, required the temporary replacement of the entire five-seat Supreme Court with substitute judges, and prompted a 2018 book, Breach of Trust, by Vermont attorney James Dunn. Separately, a 1986 Chittenden Superior Court custody ruling in which she took part became one of the cases cited in debate over Vermont's 1986 overhaul of its child-custody law.

== Early life ==
Wheel was born Beverly Jane Lavilette on July 11, 1932, at her family's home on North Avenue in Burlington, Vermont, the youngest of five children of Fredrick and Florence Lavilette. (Note: Biographical detail in this section is drawn from her 2017 obituary in the Burlington Free Press. The obituary identifies her as "Beverly Jane Wheel," using the first name Beverly and stating that she went by "Jane." Combined with her maiden name, Lavilette, this accounts for "Jane L. Wheel," the name used in all contemporary 1980s coverage. No source explicitly states that the obituary subject and the former assistant judge are the same person; the identification here rests on the convergence of maiden-name initial, exact age, and lifelong Burlington residency described below.) She went by "Jane" throughout her life. She was educated in the Burlington parochial school system and graduated from Cathedral High School in 1950. On November 5, 1951, she married Malcolm J. Wheel at the Cathedral of the Immaculate Conception in Burlington; the couple remained married for 65 years.

She grew up active behind the scenes in the state Democratic Party, including campaign work. In 1974 the party backed her for the position of assistant judge in Chittenden County, a lay position — sometimes called a "side judge" — created in Vermont's early constitutional history out of skepticism toward gubernatorially appointed judges. Assistant judges, who need not be lawyers, rule on findings of fact rather than legal questions, and also carry out administrative duties for their county courthouse, including hiring and firing court staff. Wheel took office in Chittenden County in 1975 and served until January 1987.

Unlike many assistant judges before her, Wheel took an active role in the position: she organized what became the Vermont Assistant Judges Association, serving as its president, and lobbied the Legislature as the courts moved to limit the authority of assistant judges. Contemporaries described her as having built unusually close working relationships with sitting judges, including then-Superior Court Judge William C. Hill and, later, Superior Court Judge Thomas L. Hayes, both of whom were subsequently elevated to the Supreme Court.

== State v. Hunt and the authority of assistant judges ==
In 1982, Chittenden Superior Court presided over the murder prosecution of Gordon Hunt. When Superior Court Judge James L. Morse accepted a plea agreement, Wheel and the county's other assistant judge, Charles Delaney, voted against it, raising the question of whether assistant judges could override a presiding judge's acceptance of a plea bargain. As president of the Assistant Judges Association, Wheel arranged for an amicus brief supporting the assistant judges' authority and unsuccessfully sought the Attorney General's support for that position. In May 1984 the Vermont Supreme Court, with Justice Hill in the majority, ruled in favor of the assistant judges, holding that they could reject a plea agreement. A subsequent dispute over whether Wheel should be disqualified from the case — after the defendant argued her lobbying of the Attorney General was improper — led Justice Hill, acting as the court's Chittenden County liaison, to grant Wheel a stay of her disqualification, and the case was ultimately transferred to Lamoille County. The episode later became one of the pieces of evidence cited in the conduct proceedings against Hill.

== Barbour v. Barbour and the 1986 Divorce Act ==
Wheel and Delaney, sitting as a majority over the dissent of the presiding judge, also disapproved a joint-custody stipulation reached by divorcing Burlington parents James and Kay Barbour in Chittenden Superior Court, awarding custody to the mother instead. Press coverage in 1984 had already reported friction between Wheel and divorcing parents who wanted joint custody, using the Barbours' case as an example.

On appeal, the Vermont Supreme Court did not simply affirm the assistant judges. In an opinion written by Justice William C. Hill, the Court held that the trial court's findings were inadequate to support rejecting the stipulation and remanded the custody issue for a new hearing, while affirming the rest of the divorce decree. Chief Justice Frederic Allen, joined by Justice Wynn Underwood, dissented in part, arguing the case should not be remanded at all and that the trial court should simply be instructed to adopt the parties' original joint-custody agreement.

Two years later, on July 1, 1986, Vermont's new Divorce Act took effect, replacing the concept of "custody" with a division of "parental rights and responsibilities" between parents and directing courts to give preference to parents' own agreements. A contemporaneous legal analysis of the new law by attorneys Kimberly B. Cheney and Trine C. Bech described the statute's default rule — that a court unable to secure the parents' agreement must award responsibility "primarily or solely to one parent" rather than impose joint custody on an unwilling parent — as continuing the policy set out in Barbour. An Associated Press report on the new law that August likewise revisited the Barbours' case as an example of the kind of dispute the reform was aimed at.

== Ethics investigation and criminal charges ==
In November 1985 the Vermont Attorney General opened an investigation into allegations that Wheel had submitted false pay vouchers for days she had not worked, and had used approximately $2,800 in county funds to pay for a party celebrating Justice Hayes's elevation to the Supreme Court. Investigators additionally found evidence that Wheel had altered court file jackets to make it appear she had attended proceedings on days she had not. Three inquests were held in early and mid-1986 to investigate the allegations.

During the investigation, Justices Hill and Hayes — both of whom had developed close personal ties to Wheel — took a series of actions on her behalf that were later found improper, including hand-delivering a letter to the Attorney General questioning the pace and conduct of the investigation, and drafting a new definition of assistant judges' "official duties" that had the effect of undercutting the pay-voucher allegations against her. In January 1987 the Vermont Judicial Conduct Board — in a first for the board, which had previously acted only on outside complaints — filed its own complaint alleging 25 counts of misconduct against Hill, Hayes, and Justice Ernest W. Gibson III, citing a pattern of favoritism toward Wheel. Because three of the five justices were subject to the complaint and the other two, Chief Justice Frederic W. Allen and Justice Louis Peck, recused themselves as potential witnesses, the court was temporarily staffed entirely by substitute judges — what The New York Times termed a "rump" court.

Wheel was separately charged with false swearing (a felony akin to perjury) over statements she made at the 1986 inquests. After procedural litigation — including a Vermont Supreme Court ruling that granted Wheel use-and-fruits immunity for testimony she was compelled to give in the parallel Judicial Conduct Board proceeding against Hill — Wheel was tried in Rutland from January 28 to February 23, 1988, and convicted by a jury on three counts of false swearing. She was sentenced in mid-1988 and served roughly 19 days in jail before her release. The conviction was affirmed on appeal by the Vermont Supreme Court, and a subsequent federal habeas corpus petition was denied by a U.S. district court and, in 1994, by the U.S. Court of Appeals for the Second Circuit.

Wheel ran for renomination as assistant judge in the September 1986 Democratic primary and finished last in a seven-candidate field for two nominations, losing badly to a political newcomer and to Delaney, the incumbent. She left office when her term expired at the end of January 1987.

During Hill's Judicial Conduct Board hearing in March 1988, Wheel — testifying under a grant of limited immunity — was asked directly by special counsel William Donahue whether she had had an affair with Hill while he sat on the Superior Court; she denied it, and described their relationship as one of "collegiality and ... mutual respect." She also denied a court employee's account, cited in the Judicial Conduct Board complaint, that she had been discovered with her arms around Hill in his chambers.

== Outcome for the justices ==
Of the three justices named in the 1987 complaint, only Hill's case was fully adjudicated. Hayes died in the spring of 1987 of complications from lung-cancer surgery, and the charges against him were dismissed as moot; the charges against Gibson — who was named in only seven of the 25 counts and whose relationship with Wheel was described by his own attorney as more of an acquaintance than a social friendship — were dropped for lack of evidence after he signed a statement acknowledging he could have acted more prudently. Hill retired at the end of his six-year term in early 1987 rather than seeking permission to remain on the bench until Vermont's mandatory retirement age of 70, but continued to face the disciplinary proceeding; the Vermont Supreme Court later found that a justice's retirement did not place him beyond the Judicial Conduct Board's reach. The board severed Hill's case from Wheel's in the fall of 1987 and added a further charge accusing Hill of improperly discussing a case with Wheel. The court ultimately found that Hill had violated several canons of the Code of Judicial Conduct — including the requirement to avoid impropriety, to refrain from ex parte contact with an executive-branch official on a pending matter, and to disqualify himself from proceedings involving Wheel — and barred him from ever again sitting as a judge, the harshest sanction available for a retired justice.

== Personal life and death ==
Wheel and her husband, Malcolm J. Wheel, had three children. (Note: Named living relatives are omitted here in keeping with Wikipedia's general practice of not identifying private, non-notable family members of a biography subject.) In her later years she enjoyed travel and was fond of animals. After a period of declining health that included a stroke in February 2017, she died on March 26, 2017, at the McClure Miller VNA Respite House in Colchester, Vermont, at age 84. A funeral Mass was held at St. Anthony's Church in Burlington, and she was buried at New Mount Calvary Cemetery in Burlington.

== Legacy ==
The scandal was covered nationally, including by The New York Times and The Washington Post, and is widely regarded as a turning point for judicial-conduct oversight in Vermont: it marked the first time the Judicial Conduct Board initiated a complaint on its own motion rather than in response to an outside complaint, and the first felony conviction of a Vermont judicial officer. Burlington attorney James Dunn's 2018 book Breach of Trust: The Ethics Scandal That Challenged the Integrity of the Vermont Judiciary revisited the case in detail the year after Wheel's death, drawing renewed local press coverage three decades after the events it describes.

== See also ==
- Vermont vs Hunt (1982)
- Side judge – Judicial position in Vermont, US
- William C. Hill – American judge (1917–1998)
- Thomas L. Hayes – American judge
- Ernest W. Gibson III – American attorney and judge (1927–2020)
