= Wynn Underwood =

American judge

Associate Justice of the Vermont Supreme Court
- In office 1981–1984
- Preceded by: Rudolph J. Daley
- Succeeded by: Thomas L. Hayes

President of the Vermont Bar Association
- In office 1981–1982
- Preceded by: Harvey B. Otterman Jr.
- Succeeded by: Donald H. Hackel

Judge of the Vermont Superior Court
- In office 1972–1980 Serving with Russell G. Sholes
- Preceded by: Harold C. Sylvester
- Succeeded by: James L. Morse

Member of the Vermont House of Representatives
- In office 1971–1972
- Preceded by: Russell G. Sholes, Arthur Gibb
- Succeeded by: Russell G. Sholes, Jim Douglas
- Constituency: District 15 (Middlebury, Weybridge, Ripton)

State's Attorney of Addison County, Vermont
- In office 1955–1957
- Preceded by: Paul R. Teetor
- Succeeded by: Samuel J. Wagstaff

Member of the Vermont House of Representatives
- In office 1947–1949
- Preceded by: Robert Ketcham
- Succeeded by: Robert H. Wilcox
- Constituency: Sudbury

Personal details
- Born: August 22, 1922 Plainfield, New Jersey, US
- Died: October 20, 2005 (aged 83) Shelburne, Vermont, US
- Resting place: Lakeview Cemetery, Burlington, Vermont, US
- Party: Democratic (before 1948); Republican (from 1948)
- Spouse: Sharry Marie Traver (m. 1949–1952)
- Children: 5
- Education: Boston University Law School
- Profession: Attorney

Military service
- Service: United States Army
- Years of service: 1942–1943
- Rank: Private
- Unit: Company I, 87th Infantry Regiment, 10th Mountain Division
- Wars: World War II

Wynn Thomas Underwood (August 27, 1922 – October 20, 2005) was an American attorney, political figure, and judge from Vermont. He twice served as a member of the Vermont House of Representatives, and served as an associate justice of the Vermont Supreme Court from 1980 to 1985.

== Early life ==
Underwood was born in Plainfield, New Jersey on August 27, 1922, the son of Kenneth Frederick Hull Underwood (1887–1952) and Hillary Thomas Underwood (1888–1983). He grew up on a farm in Sudbury, Vermont and attended the one-room Hill School in Orwell, then the high school in Brandon, Vermont and the Berkshire School in Sheffield, Massachusetts. Underwood attended Dartmouth College for two years and studied agriculture and animal husbandry at Cornell University before enlisting in the U.S. Army during World War II; he served with the 87th Mountain Infantry Regiment ski troops (later merged into the 10th Mountain Division).

After returning home, Underwood traveled the Caribbean as a freelance writer until returning home to Vermont. In 1946, he was elected as a Democrat to represent Sudbury in the Vermont House of Representatives, one of the youngest members of the Vermont General Assembly.

== Start of career ==
Using the G.I. Bill, Underwood attended Boston University Law School, from which he received his LL.B. in 1952. He clerked with Asa S. Bloomer in Rutland, then practiced for two years with Osmer C. Fitts in Brattleboro, after which he opened his own office in Middlebury. As a Republican, Underwood was elected state's attorney of Addison County in 1954 and served from 1955 to 1957. He practiced with the firm of Conley, Foote & Underwood in Middlebury from 1957 to 1962, then formed Underwood, Lynch & Ketcham, with which he practiced from 1962 to 1972. He was chairman of Middlebury's selectboard from 1967 to 1972. He was president of the Addison County Bar Association from 1968 to 1970 and the Vermont Trial Lawyers Association from 1969 to 1970.

Underwood was counsel to U.S. Senator George Aiken in 1965, during the passing of legislation to create the Tri-Town Water District, the nation's first rural water bill, which benefited Addison, Bridport, and Shoreham. President Lyndon B. Johnson invited Underwood to the White House for the bill signing ceremony.

== Later career ==
In 1970, Wynn was again elected to the Vermont House of Representatives, this time representing Middlebury, Weybridge, and Ripton. During his term, a vacancy opened on the Vermont Superior Court; Underwood was appointed by the Vermont General Assembly and served from 1972 to 1980. He presided over a landmark 1977 Chittenden Superior Court case in which the plaintiff, who was paralyzed in a skiing accident, won a $1.5 million judgment, which at the time was believed to be the largest in the state's history. Underwood ruled that the case could proceed, and that the inherent risks of skiing did not automatically bar seeking damages. In a 1980 interview, Underwood said that as a result of this ruling, he received "poison-pen letters from the length and breadth of the United States."

In 1980, Governor Richard A. Snelling appointed Underwood to an associate justice position on Vermont Supreme Court, succeeding Rudolph J. Daley; he served from 1980 to 1985 and became known for his pro-individual rights philosophy. In 1984, Snelling selected Frederic W. Allen, who had not previously served as a judge, to be chief justice; Underwood resigned, stating that was disappointed in being passed over. The vacancy created by Underwood's resignation allowed the incoming governor, Democrat Madeleine Kunin, to make an appointment; she selected Thomas L. Hayes.

Underwood served as president of the Vermont Bar Association from 1981 to 1982. He served as vice chairman of the Judicial Conduct Board from 1991 to 1996. Underwood died at his home in Shelburne on October 20, 2005.

== Personal life ==
Underwood was survived by his wife of fifty-six years, Sharry, his five children and their families, and two sisters. He was described as an avid hunter and fisherman and a down-to-earth man who "was the last judge to have a spittoon in his chambers."
