= State v. Warshow =

Criminal case

- Court: Vermont Supreme Court
- Full case name: State of Vermont v. John Warshow et al.
- Decided: December 21, 1979
- Citation: 410 A.2d 1000

Court membership
- Judges sitting: Albert W. Barney Jr., Rudolph J. Daley, Robert W. Larrow, Franklin S. Billings Jr., William C. Hill

Case opinions
- Decision by: Barney
- Concurrence: Hill
- Dissent: Billings

State v. Warshow, Supreme Court of Vermont, 410 A.2d 1000 (1980), is a criminal case that set forth conditions for a defense of necessity in civil disobedience during political protests. Four requirements were described that apply to other necessity defenses.

The court wrote:

1. There must be a situation of emergency arising without fault on the part of the actor concerned;
2. this emergency must be so imminent and compelling as to raise a reasonable expectation of harm, either directly to the actor or upon those he was protecting;
3. this emergency must present no reasonable opportunity to avoid the injury without doing the criminal act;
4. the injury impending from the emergency must be of sufficient seriousness to outmeasure the criminal wrong.
