= Vermont vs Hunt (1982) =

The case Vermont vs Hunt (1982) had two major outcomes. One was a ruling by the Vermont Supreme Court that side judges had the right to vote on plea agreements. The second was a lengthy review of judges' conduct used to reach this conclusion. This resulted in the state Judicial Conduct Board bringing 24 formal charges against three Supreme Court judges.

== Background ==
The state accused Gordon Hunt of murdering a neighbor in 1982. His attorney attempted to plea bargain for a minimum sentence of ten years. The judge who heard the case, James L. Morse, accepted the plea. Both side judges, including Jane Wheel, disagreed. They brought their objections to the Vermont Supreme Court and, in 1984, obtained a ruling in favor of the side judges' decision.

== Judicial conduct ==
Wheel was accused of exerting undue influence over three state Supreme Court justices, William C. Hill, Thomas L. Hayes, and Ernest W. Gibson III, and there were intimations of an affair between Wheel and Hill, which they denied. Among the other allegations against Wheel, she was accused of threatening the Vermont Attorney General, John J. Easton Jr., by suggesting she would undermine his 1984 candidacy for governor if he pursued the investigation. At one point in the investigation, Assistant Attorney General Brian L. Burgess punctured a hole in an office wall in order to eavesdrop on a conversation between Hill and Jeffrey Amestoy, who had succeeded Easton as Attorney General, in order to determine whether Hill was attempting to unduly influence Amestoy. During the investigation and subsequent court proceedings, all five Vermont Supreme Court justices recused themselves, and their positions were filled by temporary judges.

== Resolution ==
In 1986 and 1987, Hill, Hayes, and Gibson were accused of tailoring decisions to suit Wheel, and helping her cover up payroll padding. Wheel was accused of wielding undue influence over the three justices. Hayes died before the charges could be resolved, and charges against Gibson were dropped. Wheel was convicted on charges arising from the case. Hill was found to have violated rules regarding judicial conduct, and opted to retire at the end of his second six-year term, rather than applying to remain on the court until age 70, Vermont's mandatory retirement age for judges. His former colleagues banned him from serving as a judge again.

== See also ==
- Judicial misconduct

== External references ==
- Dunn, James L. (2018). Breach of Trust. Onion River Press. ISBN 9-78-099764587-3.
- "State v. Hunt".
