= Karen Carroll (judge) =

American judge (born 1963)

Associate Justice of the Vermont Supreme Court
- In office April 26, 2017 – August 23, 2025
- Appointed by: Phil Scott
- Preceded by: John Dooley
- Succeeded by: Christina Nolan

Personal details
- Born: February 7, 1963 (age 63) Newport, Vermont, U.S.
- Education: Salve Regina University (BA); Vermont Law School (JD)

Karen Russell Carroll (born February 7, 1963) is an American lawyer who served as a justice of the Vermont Supreme Court from 2017 to 2025.

== Early life ==
Karen Russell Carroll was born in Newport on February 7, 1963, and raised in Proctor; her family moved around the state based on her father's assignments as a member of the Vermont State Police. Carroll's family has been involved in law enforcement for several generations; both her grandfather and great-grandfather were chief of police in Burlington.

She is a 1981 graduate of Proctor High School, and graduated from Salve Regina University with a Bachelor of Arts and Science in Criminal Justice and English and French Literature in 1985. She received her Juris Doctor from Vermont Law and Graduate School in 1988.

== Career ==
Carroll's experience included: deputy state’s attorney for Windham County (1988–1994); Special Assistant United States Attorney for the District of Vermont (1994–2000); and assistant state attorney general with responsibility for prosecutions related to the Southern Vermont Drug Task Force (1994–2000).

From December 2000 to April 2017, Carroll was a judge of the Vermont Superior Court. She presided over Family, Criminal and Civil Divisions in Windham, Windsor, and Bennington Counties, and was the first presiding judge of Vermont’s first DUI Treatment Court, which is in Windsor County. She has also been an instructor at the Vermont Police Academy and she has taught Criminal Procedure and Criminal Law at the Community College of Vermont.

Carroll was appointed to the Vermont Supreme Court in 2017 and served until her retirement in August 2025.

== Personal life ==
Carroll is a resident of Vernon. She is married to Richard C. Carroll, who is a partner in a Brattleboro law firm. They are the parents of three children.

== Sources ==
=== Internet ===
- "Biography, Honorable Karen R. Carroll". Vermont Court System. Montpelier, VT: Vermont Judiciary. 2017.
- "Biography, The Hon. Karen Carroll". Member biographies. Philadelphia, PA: American law Institute.
- "Vt. Supreme Court Justice Karen Carroll to retire". www.wcax.com. April 9, 2025.

=== Newspapers ===
- Cassidy, Maggie B. (March 28, 2017). "After Supreme Court Nomination, Carroll Reflects On Her Career". Brattleboro Reformer. Brattleboro, VT. VTDigger.

Legal offices
Preceded by John Dooley	Associate Justice of the Vermont Supreme Court; 2017–2025	Succeeded by Christina Nolan
