= Queens–Shelburne =

Queens–Shelburne may refer to either of two electoral districts in Nova Scotia, Canada:

- Queens-Shelburne (provincial electoral district)
- Queens—Shelburne (federal electoral district)

== See also ==
- Shelburne (disambiguation)
- Queens (disambiguation)
