= Side judge =

Judicial position in Vermont, US

Courtroom of the Grand Isle County Courthouse in North Hero, with seating for three judges on the bench

Side judge, or assistant judge, is an elected judicial office unique to the U.S. state of Vermont. Each of Vermont's 14 counties elects two side judges to four-year terms. Like lay judges, side judges are usually not legal professionals.

Side judges have two roles. In court, they sit alongside a legally trained presiding judge in most cases in the Civil and Family Divisions of the Vermont Superior Court, where they take part in deciding questions of fact but not questions of law. They also serve as county officials, preparing the county budget, caring for the courthouse and other county property, and appointing the county clerk and treasurer.

The office dates to the founding of Vermont's county courts in 1781. Since the 1970s, court decisions and legislation, notably a 1984 act, have narrowed side judges' judicial authority, and repeated proposals to abolish the office have not been adopted. In the 1980s, an investigation of Chittenden County Assistant Judge Jane Wheel led to ethics charges against three justices of the Vermont Supreme Court.

== The office ==
Unlike the presiding judges of the Superior Court, who are appointed by the Governor with the consent of the Vermont Senate from a list of nominees prepared by a judicial nominating body, assistant judges are elected, as are probate judges. Side judges run at-large (not specifically for one of the two seats) and county-wide in November of even-numbered, non-presidential election years, and serve four-year terms. The terms begin on the following February 1.

In the event of a vacancy, the Governor is empowered to appoint a replacement.

Vermont's Assistant Judges also have a professional association and lobbying group, the Vermont Association of County Judges.

== Judicial role ==
Side judges sit with the presiding judge in most cases in the Civil and Family Divisions of the Superior Court, which since a 2010 restructuring has been Vermont's single statewide trial court, sitting in each of the state's 14 counties at the county's "shire town" or county seat. They do not sit in the Criminal, Probate, or Environmental Divisions, where a single judge presides, or in certain Family Division proceedings, such as juvenile and mental health cases.

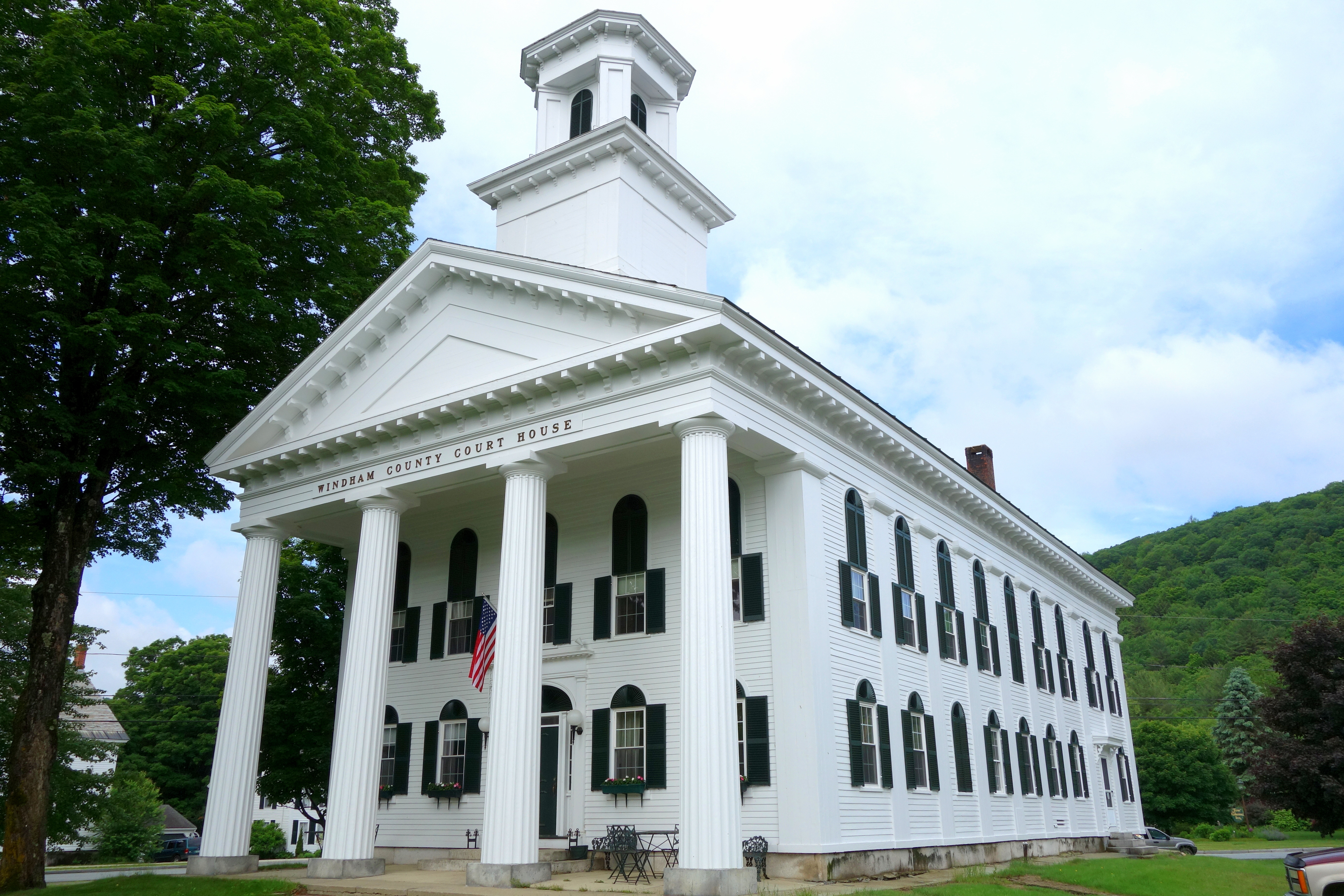
The Windham County Courthouse in Newfane, the county's shire town, built in 1825

There are normally two side judges on the bench, but the court may proceed with only one side judge or none. Side judges, who are generally not attorneys, take part only in deciding questions of fact. Questions of law are decided by the presiding judge alone; mixed questions of law and fact are treated as questions of law, and the presiding judge alone decides how each question is classified. On questions of fact, a side judge's vote carries the same weight as the presiding judge's, so two side judges can outvote the presiding judge. If the court consists of the presiding judge and one side judge and they do not agree on a decision, a mistrial is declared. Once a side judge has decided to participate in a hearing or trial, the side judge may not withdraw except for cause, and a side judge who becomes unavailable during a trial may not return to participate in it. Side judges who undergo some training may also sit alone in small claims, uncontested divorces, traffic offenses, and violations of municipal ordinances.

== County government role ==
Side judges have administrative duties in addition to court responsibilities. They prepare the county's proposed budget and present it at an annual county meeting, care for the courthouse and other county property, appoint the county clerk and county treasurer, and contract with a public accountant for a biennial audit of the county's accounts. As a result, side judges receive two types of compensation: a salary for their administrative duties, paid by the county, and a per diem for their judicial duties, paid by the state.

Once the county budget has been determined, municipalities in the county are assessed a portion, based on their grand list (total evaluation of property in the municipality).

== History ==
=== Origins ===
The position of side judge was part of Vermont's government during the mid to late 1700s period of the Vermont Republic, and was continued in the Vermont Constitution when Vermont was admitted to the Union as the fourteenth state in 1791.

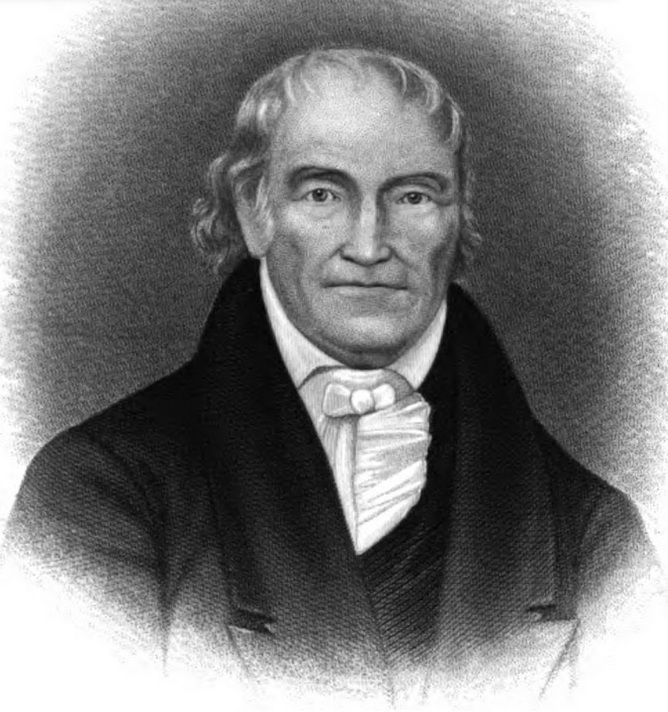
Jonas Galusha, a Bennington County side judge from 1795 to 1798 and later Governor of Vermont

The idea of side judges appears to have been borrowed from the colony of Pennsylvania, and they were also part of the judiciary in other states, including New Hampshire and Connecticut. In Vermont, they were created in part because early Vermont residents were distrustful of lawyers, many of whom had received their training in England before the American Revolution, making their loyalty suspect, or had supported New York during the dispute between New York's colonial government and Vermont's original white settlers over control of Vermont's first towns. The founders of Vermont had purchased their land grants from Benning Wentworth, the Governor of New Hampshire. When the British government supported New York's attempts to assert control, those with New Hampshire land grants refused to re-purchase them from New York. Adding lay judges to the courts was a means of ensuring that pro-British or pro-New York judges could not control the courts.

=== Development of the county courts ===
Vermont's county courts, the predecessors of the modern Superior Court, were established in 1781 with a chief judge and four assistant judges in each county, all elected by the freemen. In 1787 the number of assistant judges in each county was reduced to two, and the power to elect them was transferred to the General Assembly. In 1824 the office of chief judge was abolished, and each county court was thereafter held by a justice of the Vermont Supreme Court sitting with the two side judges. An 1850 constitutional amendment returned the election of side judges to the voters. From 1850 to 1857, four circuit judges appointed by the General Assembly presided over the county courts; Supreme Court justices then again rode circuit until 1906, when the office of superior judge was created.

Attorneys continued to serve as side judges into the 20th century. In Cady v. Lang (1921), the Vermont Supreme Court held that an assistant judge could not act as counsel while in office, and no attorney has served as a side judge since.

=== Narrowing of judicial authority ===
Side judges' role in criminal cases was first challenged in State v. Dunkerley (1976), a first-degree murder prosecution. Because the two side judges formed a majority of the court, they could in principle make any legal ruling over the presiding judge's objection; the Supreme Court held that this possibility violated due process and barred side judges from deciding legal issues in criminal cases. Justice Franklin S. Billings Jr., concurring, would have applied the same rule to civil cases. The criminal rules were then amended to give the presiding judge alone the legal component of mixed questions of law and fact, while preserving the side judges' role in finding facts and in sentencing. In State v. Hunt (1984), the two side judges in a widely publicized murder case overruled the presiding judge and rejected a plea agreement. The Supreme Court upheld their authority to do so, reasoning that the decision was an exercise of discretion rather than a question of law; Justice Louis P. Peck dissented, arguing that the majority had evaded Dunkerley. According to published reports, Jane Wheel and an attorney for the Association of Assistant Judges attempted to influence the outcome of the appeal while it was pending. In State v. Hamlin (1985), the court upheld side judges' participation in criminal sentencing, reasoning that they were at least as qualified for the task as jurors, whose participation in sentencing is constitutional.

When law and equity were merged in 1969, the powers of a chancellor were vested exclusively in the presiding judge, raising the question of whether side judges could sit in equity cases. The Vermont Supreme Court at first treated their participation as harmless "surplusage", but in Pockette v. LaDuke (1981) it held that a court including side judges lacked jurisdiction over an equitable claim, and in several later cases it found their participation reversible only where it had affected the result. In Soucy v. Soucy Motors, Inc. (1983), the court abandoned that harmless-error approach, holding that the mere presence of side judges in an equity case left the court improperly constituted and required reversal. Justices Ernest W. Gibson III and William C. Hill dissented.

The decision put earlier judgments in doubt; one local news report claimed that up to 25 percent of the state's court judgments could be reversed. Legislation to further limit side judges' role followed in the 1984 session. The Association of Assistant Judges, led by its president, Chittenden County Assistant Judge Jane Wheel, lobbied against it, and the bill that passed was a compromise. The act, approved on April 27, 1984, vested equity jurisdiction in the superior court as a whole rather than in the presiding judge alone, declared that the Legislature had never intended side judges' participation in equity cases to be reversible error, and barred judgments entered before Soucy from being set aside on that ground. It also rewrote the statute on the court's composition: questions of law, including mixed questions of law and fact, were to be decided by the presiding judge alone, who would also decide how each question was classified; side judges present in the courthouse would decide for themselves whether they were available for a case; and a side judge who became unavailable during a trial could not return to it. Substantially the same provisions remain in current law. In Solomon v. Atlantis Development, Inc. (1984), the Supreme Court held that the act's provision protecting pre-Soucy judgments violated the separation of powers, but reached the same result by applying its own retroactivity analysis. In 1985, a Vermont Law Review note argued for retaining assistant judges as elected county officials while ending their judicial functions.

In 1990 the Legislature created the Vermont Family Court, transferring jurisdiction over family matters from the superior, district, and probate courts. Side judges were given a role in it under rules largely modeled on the 1984 act, with two additions: the court must publish its schedule far enough in advance for side judges to choose the cases they will sit on, and a case retried after a mistrial must be heard by the presiding judge alone or with both side judges. The Supreme Court applied the division between law and fact to these cases. In Bolduc v. Courtemanche (1992), the two side judges in a custody case issued their own order awarding custody to the father, and the presiding judge later signed a different order awarding custody to the mother. The court held that the side judges lacked authority to award custody, so their order was a nullity; but because their factual findings had been made by a majority of the court, they were the court's findings, and the presiding judge was required to apply the law to them. In Woodbury v. Woodbury (1994), the court described a custody determination as a mixed question of law and fact, to be decided by the presiding judge on the basis of the court's findings, including those of the side judges.

=== Judicial conduct ===
Side judges are bound by the Vermont Code of Judicial Conduct and subject to discipline by the Judicial Conduct Board, which may reprimand a judge or suspend a judge for part or all of the judge's remaining term. The most serious misconduct case involving a side judge began in 1985 with a state investigation of Jane Wheel's pay vouchers. In January 1987 the Judicial Conduct Board charged three Supreme Court justices, Hill, Thomas L. Hayes, and Gibson, with showing favoritism toward her, and in 1988 Wheel was convicted of false swearing. In Velardo v. Ovitt (2007), the Supreme Court ordered a new trial in a custody case after learning that one of the side judges was the sister of the child's guardian ad litem, holding that side judges must disqualify themselves under the same rules as other judges. In In re Boardman (2009), the court suspended a Windsor County side judge from all of his duties for six months for a conflict of interest: acting for the county, he had sold county property on favorable terms to a nonprofit on whose board he sat. Rejecting an argument by the Vermont Association of County Judges, the court held that its disciplinary authority extends to side judges' administrative duties as well as their judicial ones. In 2017 the Judicial Conduct Board suspended Windham County Assistant Judge Paul Kane and permanently barred him from judicial office over his handling of an elderly woman's estate.

=== Reform and restructuring ===
Abolition of the office was recommended by a special committee studying the state's judicial system in 1937, by the Judicial Branch Study Committee in a 1966 report to the Legislative Council, and in a 1974 study of Vermont's courts by the National Center for State Courts, but none of these proposals was adopted. After a 1974 constitutional amendment required judges to retire at age 70, 14 of the 28 sitting side judges were ineligible to run for re-election that year.

Though reorganization of the judiciary in other states eliminated the side judge position, it has continued in Vermont. A 2009 judicial restructuring plan left the office in place, and the restructuring law passed in 2010 merged the state's trial courts into a single Superior Court with civil, criminal, family, probate, and environmental divisions, with side judges retained in the Civil and Family Divisions. A 2013 efficiency study that favored eliminating the elected posts was likewise not adopted.

== Notable side judges ==
Notable people who have served as side judges include:

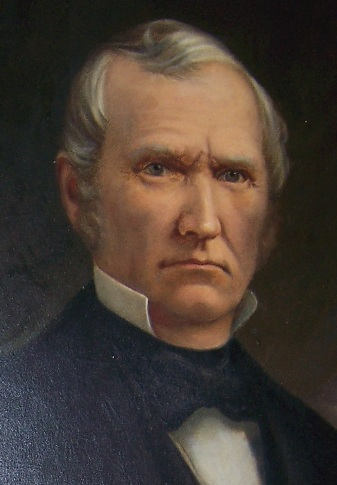
David M. Camp, Lieutenant Governor from 1836 to 1841, served as Orleans County Assistant Judge.

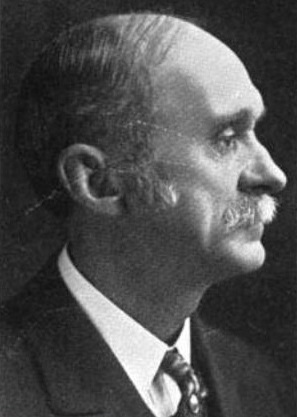
John E. Weeks, Governor from 1927 to 1931, Addison County Assistant Judge from 1884 to 1886.

- David M. Camp, Lieutenant Governor from 1836 to 1841, Orleans County Assistant Judge, 1830 to 1832 and 1834 to 1835.
- William Chamberlain, United States Representative, 1803 to 1805, 1809 to 1811, Orange County Assistant Judge, 1795–1796.
- Augustine Clarke, Vermont State Treasurer from 1833 to 1837, Caledonia County Assistant Judge, 1824–1825.
- Charles S. Dana, Speaker of the Vermont House of Representatives from 1917 to 1921, Addison County Assistant Judge, 1908–1912.
- Edward H. Edgerton, President pro tempore of the Vermont State Senate from 1925 to 1927, Windsor County Assistant Judge, 1913–1921.
- Abram W. Foote, Lieutenant Governor from 1921 to 1923, Assistant Judge of Addison County from 1902 to 1906.
- Jonas Galusha, Governor of Vermont from 1809 to 1813 and 1815 to 1820, Assistant Judge of Bennington County from 1795 to 1798.
- William Hunter, United States Representative, 1817 to 1819, Assistant Judge of Windsor County, 1805–1816.
- Elias Keyes, United States Representative from 1821 to 1823, Assistant Judge of Windsor County, 1803 to 1814.
- William C. Kittredge, Lieutenant Governor from 1852 to 1853, Rutland County Assistant Judge, 1833–1839.
- Aaron Leland, Lieutenant Governor from 1822 to 1827, Windsor County Assistant Judge, 1803–1817, 1818–1822.
- Orlando L. Martin, Speaker of the Vermont House of Representatives from 1923 to 1925, Washington County Assistant Judge, 1939 to his death.
- Samuel Mattocks, Vermont State Treasurer from 1786 to 1800, Rutland County Assistant Judge, 1783–1788, 1794.
- Gideon Olin, United States Representative, 1803–1807, Assistant Judge of Bennington County, 1781–1798.
- William M. Pingry, Vermont Auditor of Accounts from 1853 to 1860, Assistant Judge in both Washington (1838–1839) and Windsor (1880 to his death) Counties.
- Thomas Porter, Speaker of the Vermont House of Representatives, 1780 to 1782, Assistant Judge of Rutland County, 1781–1782.
- James M. Slade, son of Governor William Slade, Lieutenant Governor from 1856 to 1857, Assistant Judge of Addison County, 1868 to 1870.
- John Spaulding, Vermont State Treasurer from 1841 to 1846.
- Paul Spooner, Lieutenant Governor, 1782 to 1787, Windsor County Assistant Judge, 1779–1782, 1785–1789.
- Zed S. Stanton, Lieutenant Governor of Vermont from 1902 to 1904, Washington County Assistant Judge, 1884–1888.
- John Strong, Speaker of the Vermont House of Representatives in 1786, Assistant Judge of Bennington County, 1781–1782.
- John E. Weeks, Governor from 1927 to 1931, Addison County Assistant Judge, 1884–1886.
- Jane Wheel, central figure in a 1985–1989 judicial ethics scandal that led to disciplinary proceedings against three Vermont Supreme Court justices, Chittenden County Assistant Judge, 1975–1987.
- David Wing Jr., Secretary of State of Vermont from 1802 to 1806, Caledonia County Assistant Judge, 1797-1803, Presiding Judge, 1804-1806.
- Augustus Young, United States Representative, 1841 to 1843, Franklin County Assistant Judge, 1851–1854.

== Current side judges ==
As of April 2025, the assistant judges in each county are:

List of Current side judges

=== Addison County ===
Middlebury

- Patricia Ross, Democratic
- Nicole Wilkerson, Democratic

=== Bennington County ===
Bennington

- Brian W. Peat, Democratic
- Mary C. Frost, Democratic

=== Caledonia County ===
St. Johnsbury

- Merle Haskins, Independent
- (Vacant)

=== Chittenden County ===
Burlington

- Suzanne Brown, Democratic
- Connie C. Ramsey, Democratic

=== Essex County ===
Guildhall

- Evan Hammond, Republican
- Kenn Stransky, Republican

=== Franklin County ===
St. Albans

- Kelly Gosselin, Republican
- (Vacant)

=== Grand Isle ===
North Hero, Vermont

- Sherri Potvin, Democratic
- (Vacant)

=== Lamoille County ===
Hyde Park

- Madeline M. Motta, Democratic
- Patricia Gabel, Republican

=== Orange County ===
Chelsea

- Laurel Mackin, Democratic
- Joyce McKeeman, Democratic

=== Orleans County ===
Newport

- Sean Selby, Independent
- Curtis A. Hardy, Republican/Democratic

=== Rutland County ===
Rutland

- David S. Wolk, Independent
- Stephen P. Benard, Republican

=== Washington County ===
Montpelier

- Elizabeth Battey, Democratic
- Leah Murphy Jones, Democratic

=== Windham County ===
Newfane

- Carolyn Partridge, Democratic
- Lamont Barnett, Democratic

=== Windsor County ===
Woodstock

- Alison Johannensen, Democratic
- Michael Ricci, Democratic

== See also ==
- Judicial System of Sweden: Lay Judges
- Assessor (law)
