= Shelburne =

Shelburne may refer to:

== People ==
- Marquess of Lansdowne
- John Petty, 1st Earl of Shelburne (1706–1761), Member of the Great Britain Parliament
- William Petty, 2nd Earl of Shelburne (1737–1805), Prime Minister of Great Britain
- Ramona Shelburne (born 1979), American sportswriter and softball player

== Places ==
=== Australia ===
- Shelburne, Queensland, a locality in the Shire of Cook

=== Canada ===
- Shelburne, Nova Scotia
- Shelburne, Nova Scotia (municipal district)
- Shelburne County, Nova Scotia
- Shelburne (federal electoral district), Nova Scotia
- Shelburne (provincial electoral district), Nova Scotia
- Shelburne, Ontario

=== Ireland ===
- Shelburne (barony), a barony in County Wexford

=== United States ===
- Shelburne, Indiana
- Shelburne, Massachusetts
- Shelburne, New Hampshire
- Shelburne, Vermont, a New England town
  - Shelburne (CDP), Vermont, the central village in the town
  - Shelburne Museum

== Ship ==
- HMS Shelburne (1813)

== See also ==
- Shelbourne (disambiguation)
