= Justice Burgess =

Justice Burgess or Burges may refer to:

- Brian L. Burgess (born 1951), associate justice of the Vermont Supreme Court
- Gavon D. Burgess (1832–1910), associate justice of the Supreme Court of Missouri
- Tristam Burges (1770–1853), chief justice of the Rhode Island Supreme Court
- Walter S. Burgess (1808–1892), associate justice of the Rhode Island Supreme Court

== See also ==
- Judge Burgess (disambiguation)
