= William D. Cohen =

American judge (born 1957)

William Cohen

Associate Justice of the Vermont Supreme Court
- In office December 20, 2019 – December 27, 2025
- Appointed by: Phil Scott
- Preceded by: Marilyn Skoglund
- Succeeded by: Michael P. Drescher

Personal details
- Born: January 21, 1957 (age 69) New York City, New York, U.S.
- Spouse: Barbara Kinsman Buck (m. 1990)
- Children: 2
- Education: George Washington University (BA); Vermont Law School (JD)

William David Cohen (born January 21, 1957) is an American lawyer who served as an associate justice of the Vermont Supreme Court from 2019 to 2025.

== Education and legal career ==
William David Cohen was born in Queens, New York on January 21, 1957, the son of Herbert and Sandra (Jacobs) Cohen. He attended the public schools of Rutland City, Vermont and graduated from Rutland High School in 1975. He received a Bachelor of Arts degree in Environmental Science from George Washington University in 1980 and a Juris Doctor degree from Vermont Law School in 1984.

While attending college, Cohen worked in the Washington, DC office of US Senator Robert Stafford. While attending law school, he worked as a clerk in the legal department of the Central Vermont Public Service Corporation, followed by a part-time position as a clerk in the office of the state’s attorney for Rutland County.

After attaining admission to the bar, Cohen served as a deputy state’s attorney for Rutland County from 1984 to 1986. From 1986 until 1999, Cohen was an attorney in private practice. In 1999, he was appointed a judge of the Vermont Superior Court by Governor Howard Dean.

=== Vermont Supreme Court ===
In December 2019, Governor Phil Scott appointed Cohen to serve as an associate justice of the Vermont Supreme Court, succeeding Marilyn Skoglund. He was sworn into office on December 20, 2019.

Cohen retired from the court on December 27, 2025.

== Personal life ==
In 1990, Cohen married Barbara Kinsman Buck. They are the parents of a daughter Alix, a resident of San Francisco, and a son, Robert, a resident of Killington, Vermont.

Legal offices
Preceded by Marilyn Skoglund	Associate Justice of the Vermont Supreme Court; 2019–2025	Succeeded by Michael P. Drescher
