= Rudolph J. Daley =

American judge (1918–1990)

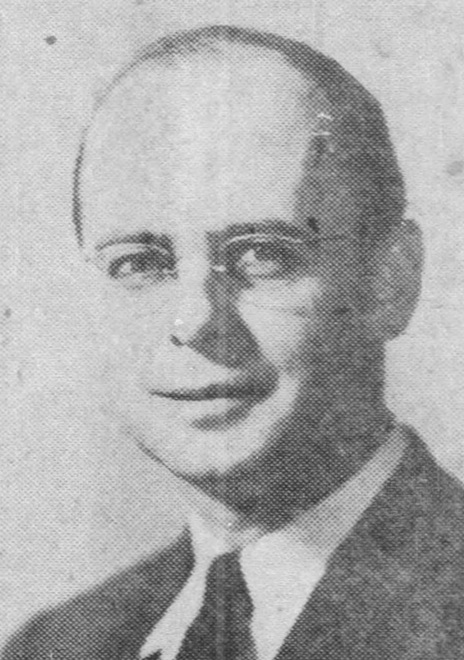
- Newport Daily Express, November 7, 1956

Associate Justice of the Vermont Supreme Court
- In office 1972–1980
- Preceded by: Percival L. Shangraw
- Succeeded by: Wynn Underwood

Chief Judge of the Vermont Superior Court
- In office 1966–1972
- Preceded by: Natt L. Divoll Jr.
- Succeeded by: William C. Hill

Judge of the Vermont Superior Court
- In office 1959–1972
- Preceded by: Leonard W. Morrison
- Succeeded by: Ernest W. Gibson III

Member of the Vermont House of Representatives
- In office 1957–1959
- Preceded by: Robert W. H. Davis
- Succeeded by: Raymond E. Blake
- Constituency: Newport City

State's Attorney of Orleans County, Vermont
- In office 1953–1957
- Preceded by: Leonard Pearson
- Succeeded by: Leonard Pearson
- In office 1947–1950
- Preceded by: Maxwell Baton
- Succeeded by: Leonard Pearson

Personal details
- Born: September 10, 1918 Newport, Vermont, U.S.
- Died: September 26, 1990 (aged 72) Newport, Vermont, U.S.
- Resting place: St. Mary's Cemetery, Newport, Vermont, U.S.
- Party: Republican
- Spouse: Blanche Daigle (m. 1945)
- Children: 4
- Education: Saint Michael's College (attended)
- Profession: Attorney
- Military career
- Allegiance: United States; Vermont
- Service: United States Army; Vermont Army National Guard
- Service years: 1935–1967
- Rank: Colonel
- Service number: 0404941
- Unit: 43rd Infantry Division
- Commands: Company L, 172nd Infantry Regiment
- Wars: World War II

Rudolph J. Daley (September 10, 1918 – September 26, 1990) was a Vermont attorney, politician, and judge. He is most notable for serving as an associate justice of the Vermont Supreme Court from 1972 to 1980.

== Early life ==
Daley was born John Rudolph Edward Daley in Newport, Vermont on September 10, 1918, the son of Patrick T. Daley and Fedora (Borque) Daley. He attended Sacred Heart parochial school in Newport, and graduated from Newport High School. Daley attended Saint Michael's College for a year, and then began the study of law in the office of attorney Raymond L. Miles of Newport. Daley was admitted to the bar in 1946, and practiced in Newport.

== Military service ==
Daley was a longtime member of the Vermont Army National Guard; he enlisted in 1935, attended the Citizens' Military Training Camps conducted at Fort Devens, Massachusetts in the early 1940s, and received his commission as a second lieutenant of infantry in 1941. He served on active duty with the 43rd Infantry Division in the Pacific Theater from 1943 to 1945, and was serving at the Tulare, California prisoner of war camp at the time of his 1945 wedding. He transferred to the judge advocate general corps after becoming an attorney, and he returned to active duty again when the division was called to federal service during the Korean War, serving this time in West Germany. Daley was promoted to lieutenant colonel in 1960, attained the rank of colonel in the mid-1960s, and retired from the military in the late 1960s.

== Early career ==
A Republican, Daley served as State's Attorney of Orleans County from 1947 to 1950, and 1953 to 1957. He was Newport's City Attorney from 1949 to 1950, and again from 1957 to 1959. In 1956, Daley was elected to represent Newport in the Vermont House of Representatives, and he was reelected in 1958.

== Judicial career ==
In 1959, Daley was appointed a judge of the Vermont Superior Court. By 1966, Daley had advanced by seniority to become chief judge of the superior court. By tradition, the chief judge of the superior court was next in line for appointment to the Vermont Supreme Court.

In 1972, Daley was appointed as an associate justice of the Vermont Supreme Court, filling the vacancy created when Associate Percival L. Shangraw was promoted to chief justice.

Daley remained on the court until retiring in 1980, and was succeeded by Wynn Underwood.

== Retirement and death ==
In retirement, Daley was a resident of Newport, and he died in Newport on September 26, 1990. Daley was buried at St. Mary's Cemetery in Newport.

== Family ==
In 1945, Daley married Blanche Daigle (1918-1986). They were the parents of Daniel, Rosemary, Anne Marie, and Timothy.

== Sources ==
=== Newspapers ===
- "Get Jap Flag". Burlington Free Press. Burlington, VT. June 16, 1943 – via Newspapers.com.
- "Licensed to Wed: Daley-Daigle". Newport Daily Express. Newport, VT. February 28, 1945 – via Newspapers.com.
- "Three Young Men Pass Examinations to State Bar: Six Others Complete Tests, But They Must Finish Studies". Burlington Free Press. Burlington, VT. Morning Press Bureau. October 4, 1946 – via Newspapers.com.
- "William Hill and Rudolph Daley Are Elected State Superior Judges". Burlington Free Press. Burlington, VT. Morning Press Bureau. February 20, 1959 – via Newspapers.com.
- "Col. Sibley Reassigned". Bennington Banner. Bennington, VT. April 18, 1960 – via Newspapers.com.
- "Divoll Resigns Superior Bench; Larrow in Line?". Burlington Free Press. Burlington, VT. April 22, 1966 – via Newspapers.com.
- "Gov. Hoff Reviews Troops". Burlington Free Press. Burlington, VT. August 4, 1967 – via Newspapers.com.
- Chapman, Geoffrey (January 28, 1972). "Daley Elected to Vt. Supreme Court". Bennington Banner. Bennington, VT – via Newspapers.com.
- Smith, Jane; MacKay, Scott (December 20, 1980). "Underwood gets High Court Post". Burlington Free Press. Burlington, VT – via Newspapers.com.
- "Obituary, Blanche C. Daley". Burlington Free Press. Burlington, VT. March 27, 1986 – via Newspapers.com.
- Donoghue, Mike (September 27, 1990). "Retired State High Court Justice Dies". Burlington Free Press. Burlington, VT – via Newspapers.com.
- "Obituary, Rudolph J. Daley". Burlington Free Press. Burlington, VT. September 27, 1990 – via Newspapers.com.

=== Books ===
- Thomas, Richard C. (1969). State of Vermont Legislative Directory. Montpelier, VT: Vermont Secretary of State.
- U.S. Army General (1961). U.S. Army Register (1960). Washington, DC: US Government Printing Office – via Ancestry.com.

=== Internet ===
- Spear, Rufus W. (Newport, VT City Clerk) (September 10, 1918). "Vermont Birth Records, 1909-2008, Entry for John Rudolph Edward Daley". Ancestry.com. Provo, UT: Ancestry.com, LLC.

Political offices
Preceded by Percival L. Shangraw	Justice of the Vermont Supreme Court; 1972–1980	Succeeded by Wynn Underwood
