= Marilyn Skoglund =

American judge

Associate Justice of the Vermont Supreme Court
- In office 1997–2019
- Preceded by: Ernest W. Gibson III
- Succeeded by: William D. Cohen

Judge of the Vermont District Court
- In office 1994–1997
- Preceded by: Frank Mahady
- Succeeded by: Patricia Zimmerman

Personal details
- Born: August 15, 1946 (age 80) Chicago, Illinois, U.S.
- Children: 2
- Education: Southern Illinois University Carbondale; Woodbury College
- Profession: Attorney

Marilyn Skoglund (born August 15, 1946) is a former Associate Justice of the Vermont Supreme Court. She is well known for having attained admission to the bar and appointment to the bench despite not having gone to law school.

== Life and career ==
Marilyn Ruth Signe Skoglund was born in Chicago, Illinois on August 15, 1946, and was raised in St. Louis, Missouri. She received a Bachelor of Arts degree in fine arts from Southern Illinois University Carbondale in 1971, and settled in Plainfield, Vermont in 1973 when her then-husband accepted a teaching position at Goddard College. She was divorced shortly afterwards.

Skoglund attended the paralegal program at Montpelier's Woodbury College. She studied law under the supervision of Louis P. Peck while working in the Vermont Attorney General's office, a practice still permitted in Vermont, and became an attorney in 1978.

After receiving her law license Skoglund continued her career in the Vermont Attorney General's office. Her assignments included: Special Assistant Attorney General (1978-1981); Assistant Attorney General (1981-1989); Chief of the Civil Law Division (1989-1993); and Chief of the Public Protection Division (1993-1994).

In 1994 Skoglund was appointed to the Vermont District Court. She served until 1997, when she was appointed to the Vermont Supreme Court to succeed the retiring Ernest W. Gibson III.

Skoglund was continued in office by the state Judicial Retention Committee in 2005, 2011, and 2017.

In May 2019, Skoglund informed Governor Phil Scott of her intention to retire effective September 1, 2019. She was succeeded by William D. Cohen.
