= John Dooley (judge) =

American judge

John A. Dooley

Associate Justice of the Vermont Supreme Court
- In office June 12, 1987 – March 31, 2017
- Appointed by: Madeleine Kunin
- Preceded by: William C. Hill
- Succeeded by: Karen Carroll

Secretary of the Vermont Agency of Administration
- In office 1985–1987
- Governor: Madeleine Kunin
- Preceded by: David S. Wilson
- Succeeded by: Thomas P. Menson

Magistrate Judge of the United States District Court for the District of Vermont
- In office 1971–1975

Personal details
- Born: John Augustine Dooley III; April 10, 1944 (age 82) Nashua, New Hampshire, U.S.
- Education: Union College (BEE); Boston College (LLB)

John Augustine Dooley III (born April 10, 1944) is an American lawyer and former judge who served as a justice of the Vermont Supreme Court from 1987 to 2017.

== Biography ==
John A. Dooley of South Burlington, Vermont was born in Nashua, New Hampshire on April 10, 1944. He attended school in Nashua, and graduated from Union College in 1965 with a Bachelor of Electrical Engineering degree. He received his J.D. degree from Boston College Law School in 1968 and became an attorney in Vermont.

Dooley's career included serving as law clerk to federal judge Bernard Joseph Leddy. He was also deputy director and later Director of Vermont Legal Aid, Inc. Dooley was a United States magistrate judge, and served as legal counsel to Governor Madeleine M. Kunin.

From 1985 to 1987 Dooley was Vermont's Secretary of Administration. Dooley was appointed to succeed William C. Hill as an associate justice of the Vermont Supreme Court on June 12, 1987. He retired from active service on March 31, 2017.

From 1988 to 1989 Dooley was president of the Vermont Bar Association. For many years he has been involved in the Vermont-Karelia Rule of Law Project and the Russia-United States Legal Foundation.
