= Sam Bartlett =

American entertainer

- Bartlett performing at the John C. Campbell Folk School

Background information
- Born: Samuel Hamilton Bartlett; November 8, 1961 (age 64); Burlington, Vermont, United States
- Genres: Irish; old-time; contra dance
- Occupations: American artist, cartoonist, performer, musician, composer
- Instruments: tenor banjo, five-string banjo, mandolin
- Website: www.sambartlett.com

Sam Bartlett (born Samuel Hamilton Bartlett, November 8, 1961, Burlington, Vermont) is an American folk artist, public art instigator, cartoonist, performer, musician, and composer. As a visual artist, Bartlett's iconic style has been featured in publications, solo exhibitions, collaborative public artworks, and moving object performances including panoramic "crankie shows" and large-scale papier-mache puppetry. Stuntology is Bartlett's signature art and performance genre of humorous parlor tricks and messy exploration with everyday objects. Decades of collection and documentation are represented in four illustrated volumes of Stuntology cartoons, as well as his long-running one-man show. As a musician, Bartlett is a prominent performer and composer of traditional American, Irish and New England folk music on the national contra dance circuit.

== Early life ==
Bartlett is the youngest of four children born to Richmond Jay Bartlett and Martha Harry Bartlett. He attended Shelburne Village School and the Shelburne Middle School in Shelburne, Vermont. He received the Daughters of the American Revolution Good Citizenship Award in 8th grade. At Champlain Valley Union High School in Hinesburg, Vermont, he was voted class clown and was known for his banjo playing, drawing and tennis skills. After graduating in three and a half years, Bartlett attended the University of Vermont and studied geography (1984).

== Musical career ==
Bartlett performed with The Green Mountain Volunteers on the banjo and as an Appalachian clogger in 1984. He played contra dances around Vermont and New England starting in 1985, supplementing his income by making apple cider for the Chittenden Cider Mill from 1985 to 1988. After moving to Boston he became ensconced in the urban contra dance scene. During this time he played mandolin and tenor banjo with three highly influential touring bands: Uncle Gizmo, Wild Asparagus, and the Clayfoot Strutters, and assisted in reshaping the face of modern contra dance music.

Bartlett met his wife, Abby Ladin, in 1992 and moved to Bloomington, Indiana. He became a member of the percussive dance and music company, Rhythm In Shoes. He and Ladin toured with the company together for five years.

Bartlett resumed playing the national contra dance circuit in 1997 after forming the Reckless Ramblers (with Larry Unger, Nat Hewitt, Ginny Snowe, and later Mark Hellenberg) and also being an original member of the Sevens (with Mark Roberts, Sarah Blair, Stuart Kenney, and Mark Hellenberg). In 2005, Bartlett began playing with Notorious (Eden MacAdam-Somer, Larry Unger, and Mark Hellenberg) and continues to play with them to this day. Since 2014, Bartlett has also been a member of the 5-piece Stringrays, with Rodney Miller, Max Newman, Mark Hellenberg, and Stuart Kenney.

In addition to being a contra dance musician, Bartlett has maintained a dual identity as an old-time musician. He helped found the Monks shortly thereafter (with Frank Hall, Claudio Buchwald, and Abby Ladin.) The Monks released two critically acclaimed recordings, distributed widely by County Records: Let Us Play (1998), and Ragged But Righteous (2002). In 1999, Bartlett began playing with Illinois native fiddler Garry Harrison, and he was an integral member of the group that made the now legendary recording of original old-time music, Red Prairie Dawn (2000).

Though a proud practitioner and teacher of various traditional music styles, Bartlett has made his own recording career as a musical iconoclast, choosing to blend musical styles rather than adhere to any notion of genre purity. This started with Sam and Sue Belting You with Reels (1993, re-released in 2006) with Bartlett playing swing guitar with traditional Irish fiddler, Sue Sternberg. Bartlett traveled to southwest Louisiana in 1996 and teamed up with Dirk Powell to make Swamp Ceili, the first radical mixing of Irish and Cajun and Zydeco music. Swamp Ceili featured the slide guitarist Sonny Landreth. In 2004, Bartlett followed Swamp Ceili with a recording of all original music, Evil Diane. This was the first contra dance repertoire CD to be reviewed on NPR’s All Things Considered. In 2016, Bartlett released a sequel to Evil Diane, Dance-a-rama.

== Cartoonist and community artist ==
Concurrent with a long and active music performing career, Bartlett has maintained another identity as a documentarian and drawer of tricks and stunts. The Journal of Stuntology was Bartlett's self-published zine from 1992 to 2006. A selection of cartoons from the zine was edited into the book Stuntology (2002) and followed in 2007 by The Big Book of Stuntology. Workman publishing bought the rights to these two books in 2007 and put out The Best of Stuntology (2008). Bartlett has also self-published 51 Impossible Stunts Anyone Can Do.

Bartlett has been a featured character/performer on the Indiana PBS show, The Friday Zone, since 2012. The steady rotation of 45 different segments of his stunts has made him recognizable to children throughout the state.

As an offshoot of illustrating a series of books, Bartlett has been hired by the city of Bloomington, Indiana, to do public artwork, notably featuring traffic boxes and murals. The murals for the Building and Trades Park measure 750 feet long and celebrate the trades that built the city of Bloomington. Bartlett has received Indiana State Arts in the Parks Grants to make collaborative moving panoramas.

Bartlett has been hired by communities across the country to do local, participatory art projects. His specialty has been to make participatory "Crankie Shows", hand-cranked, moving panorama drawings that tell stories that happened in a certain locale. He has been a touring artist in Alaska and an artist in residence with the Juneau Arts and Humanities Council. He received a grant from the State of Indiana to write a moving panorama history of its oldest State Park, McCormick's Creek State Park. He was hired by the Lotus World Music Festival to make giant paper mache parade masks and a participatory cranky show about the life of Lotus Dickey.

Following a visit to Howard Finster in 1990, Bartlett began making plywood cutout sculptures from found wood. He has made 615 sculptures to date and his show Low Stakes: Plywood Cutouts and Everyday Comix has been featured at the McCarthy Art Gallery at Saint Michael's College in Colchester, Vermont (2022), as well as the Baron and Ellin Gordon Gallery at Old Dominion University in Norfolk, Virginia (2023). His designs have been used by performing groups We Banjo 3 and Rising Appalachia.

== Personal life ==
He lives with his wife, Abby Ladin, and three kids in Bloomington, Indiana.

== Works ==
=== Books ===
- Grötkräkla, Stuntology Press, 2023, ISBN 978-0979183027
- Thinks Best in Wire, Stuntology Music, ISBN 978-0979183010
- 51 Impossible Stunts Anyone Can Do, 2015, self-published.
- The Best of Stuntology: 304 Pranks, Tricks & Challenges to Amuse & Annoy Your Friends. Workman Publishing. 2008. ISBN 978-0-7611-4978-1.
- The Big Book of Stuntology, Stuntology Press, 2007, ISBN 0-9791830-0-6
- Stuntology, Stuntology Press, 2002, ISBN 978-1-885387-09-7

=== Recordings ===
- Dance-a-rama, 2016
- Evil Diane, 2004
- Swamp Ceili, 1997
- Belting You with Reels, with Sue Sternberg, 1993, reissued 2006
