= James L. Morse =

American judge (1940–2023)

James L. Morse (September 11, 1940 – January 13, 2023) was an American jurist who was an associate justice of the Vermont Supreme Court from 1988 to 2003.

Born in New York City, Morse received an A.B. from Dartmouth College in 1962, and served in the United States Naval Reserve from 1963 to 1966. He received a J.D. from Boston University School of Law in 1969, graduating magna cum laude and serving as editor-in-chief of the Boston University Law Review from 1967 to 1969. He served as a law clerk to Judge Sterry R. Waterman of the United States Court of Appeals for the Second Circuit from 1969 to 1970, and then entered private practice in Burlington, Vermont.

From 1981 to 1988, Morse was a judge of the Vermont Superior Court 1981–88. On September 23, 1988, Morse was appointed to the state supreme court by Governor Madeleine Kunin, following the death of Thomas L. Hayes, and the failure of the state senate to confirm Frank G. Mahady to the seat.

On January 16, 2003, Morse resigned from the court to become Commissioner of the Department of Social and Rehabilitative Services.

Morse died on January 13, 2023, at the age of 82.

== See also ==
- Vermont vs Hunt (1982)

Political offices
Preceded by Frank G. Mahady	Justice of the Vermont Supreme Court; 1988–2003	Succeeded by Paul Reiber
