= Shelbourne =

Shelbourne may refer to:

== Dublin, Ireland ==
- Shelbourne Park, a greyhound racing stadium
- Shelbourne Hotel, a hotel in the city centre
- Shelbourne Road, a neighbourhood around the road with the same name
- Shelbourne F.C., an association football club
- Shelbourne United F.C., a former football club

== Australia ==
- Shelbourne, Victoria, a small town located near Maldon in Victoria, Australia
  - Shelbourne railway station in the town

== Canada ==
- Shelbourne, a neighborhood in Saanich, British Columbia

== People with the surname ==
- Cecily Shelbourne, pseudonym of Suzanne Goodwin (1916–2008), British writer
- Philip Shelbourne (1924–1993), British lawyer and financier, chairman of merchant bank Samuel Montagu & Co.
- Roy Mahlon Shelbourne (1890–1974), United States district judge in Kentucky

== See also ==
- Shelburne (disambiguation)
