= Judge Burgess =

Judge Bulter may refer to:

- Frank Burgess (1935–2010), judge of the United States District Court for the Western District of Washington
- Timothy M. Burgess (born 1956), judge of the United States District Court for the District of Alaska

== See also ==
- Justice Burgess (disambiguation)
