= Frank G. Mahady =

American judge (1939–1992)

Associate Justice of the Vermont Supreme Court
- In office 1987–1988
- Preceded by: Thomas L. Hayes
- Succeeded by: James L. Morse

Judge of the Vermont District Court
- In office 1982–1992
- Preceded by: Alden T. Bryan
- Succeeded by: Marilyn Skoglund

State's Attorney of Windsor County, Vermont
- In office February 1, 1969 – April 30, 1972
- Preceded by: James W. Wright
- Succeeded by: Paul Hudson

Personal details
- Born: March 31, 1939 Taunton, Massachusetts, U.S.
- Died: August 18, 1992 (aged 53) Lebanon, New Hampshire, U.S.
- Resting place: Merrill Cemetery, Colchester, Vermont, U.S.
- Party: Republican
- Spouse(s): Susan L. Perkins (m. 1960); Sheryl (Sherry) Symmes (m. 1967)
- Children: 2
- Education: Dartmouth College; Georgetown University Law Center
- Profession: Attorney
- Nickname: "Skip"

Frank G. Mahady (March 31, 1939 – August 18, 1992) was a Vermont attorney and judge. He was appointed to the Vermont Supreme Court in 1987, but never confirmed by the Senate; he withdrew his confirmation request on April 3, 1988.

== Early life ==
Frank Gordon "Skip" Mahady was born in Taunton, Massachusetts on March 31, 1939, the son of Frank D. and Doris (Potter) Mahady. He was raised in Hartford, Vermont, and graduated from Hartford High School in 1957. As a boy, Mahady crushed a hand between two train cars while playing in the railroad yards of White River Junction. As a teenager, he lost an eye to an accident with a BB gun. He received his bachelor's degree (with honors) from Dartmouth College in 1961, and his law degree (second in his class) from Georgetown University Law Center in 1964; Patrick Leahy was one of Mahady's law school classmates.

== Start of career ==
Mahady was admitted to the bar in 1964, and practiced law until 1967. A liberal Republican, he was recognized as a protege of Lieutenant Governor and Vermont Supreme Court Justice Thomas L. Hayes and Vermont Attorney General and federal Judge James L. Oakes. Mahady served as an Assistant Attorney General from 1967 to 1968, and Deputy Attorney General from 1968 to 1969, when Oakes served as Attorney General. In 1967, Mahady was the Vermont coordinator for the George W. Romney presidential campaign; he resigned after joining the Vermont Attorney General's office in order to prevent the appearance of a conflict of interest.

From 1969 to 1972, Mahady served as Windsor County's State's Attorney, and he was a delegate to the 1972 Republican National Convention. He then resumed the practice of law, and continued until he was appointed to the bench in 1982. While in private practice, Mahady was contracted to serve as Windsor County's public defender in 1972 and 1973. In 1977, testimony at a trial indicated that Mahady had accepted a $5,000 fee from a client in 1973 to work on a private case while he was supposed to work only on cases in his role as a public defender. He argued that he had received oral permission from Vermont's Defender General, and was cleared of wrongdoing by Vermont's Professional Conduct Board. In 1978, a Vermont Superior Court judge ruled in a civil trial that Mahady had broken the law by accepting the payment, and fined him one dollar, but denied the state attorney general's request to have Mahady forfeit the money.

== Judicial career ==
In 1982, Mahady was appointed a judge of the Vermont District Court. In 1984, Vermont authorities carried out raids against the Northeast Kingdom Community Church, and seized more than 100 children on the grounds of suspected child abuse. The state attempted to maintain custody of the children, even though there was scant evidence of wrongdoing by their parents. In response, Hayes, then serving as the state's administrative judge, assigned Mahady to hear motions. Mahady conducted 40 hearings in one day, determined that there was insufficient evidence of child abuse, and ordered the children returned to the custody of their parents.

Later in 1984, Mahady presided over the trial of protesters—the "Winooski 44"—who had occupied the Winooski office of Senator Robert Stafford to protest U.S. involvement in civil wars and insurgencies in Central America, and refused to leave until Stafford agreed to hold a public meeting to discuss the topic. Mahady allowed 26 of the defendants to employ the necessity defense. Necessity enabled the defendants to argue that they broke the law by occupying Stafford's office as a way to draw attention to the larger supposed crimes associated with U.S. activities in El Salvador and Nicaragua. The trial ended with acquittals of all 26 defendants.

Mahady's support for individual liberties earned him nicknames including "Freedom Frank"—a compliment from his admirers, and an epithet from his detractors, who argued that he treated defendants too leniently. While serving as a district court judge, Mahady moved to Essex Junction, Vermont, where he resided for the rest of his life.

== Supreme Court nomination ==
In August 1987, Governor Madeleine Kunin considered James L. Morse and Mahady for appointment to the Vermont Supreme Court to succeed Hayes, who had died after two years as an associate justice. She appointed Mahady, pending confirmation by the Vermont State Senate, which begins its sessions in January and usually meets until April or May. When the State Senate began confirmation hearings in March 1988, Mahady provided financial disclosure forms which indicated that he owed a substantial amount in unpaid income taxes to the Internal Revenue Service, and had worked for several years to pay the accumulated taxes, penalties, and interest. His accountant and office manager both testified to the Senate Judiciary Committee that the unpaid taxes from the late 1970s and early 1980s were their fault because they had not filed tax forms and made payments in a timely manner, and Mahady admitted to inattentiveness to his finances during the illness of one of his daughters. Opposition from some conservative Republicans and the controversy over Mahady's finances caused him to withdraw from consideration on March 31. Kunin then appointed Morse, who was confirmed.

== Later career ==
Despite the controversy over his finances, Mahady's reputation for personal integrity remained largely intact, and he was able to continue his judicial career. He returned to his seat on the Vermont District Court, and in 1989 he was appointed to a second seven-year term by the Vermont General Assembly. The vote was 108 to 60, an unusually high number of "no" votes from legislators, but in response to questionnaires from the legislature's Joint Judicial Retention Committee, more than 95 percent of the attorneys who practiced before Mahady recommended that he be retained, as did nearly 80 percent of police and probation officers who appeared in his court.

== Death and burial ==
Mahady was diagnosed with intestinal cancer in 1988. He continued to serve as a judge while he received treatment, but in August 1992 his health precipitously declined. He was admitted to Dartmouth-Hitchcock Medical Center in Lebanon, New Hampshire, where he died on August 19, 1992.

== Legacy ==
The courthouse in Middlebury was constructed from 1995 to 1996, and was named for Mahady.

== Family ==
In 1960, Mahady married Susan L. Perkins of Lewiston, Idaho. After his first marriage ended in divorce, in 1967, Mahady married Sheryl (Sherry) Symmes in Norwich, Vermont; his best man was Patrick Leahy. Frank and Sherry Mahady were the parents of two daughters, Shannon and Tara.

== Sources ==
=== Internet ===
- Dartmouth College Class of 1961 (2011). "In Memoriam, Frank Gordon Mahady" (PDF). dartmouth.org. Hanover, NH: Dartmouth College.
- "Vermont Marriage Records, 1909-2008, Entry for Frank G Mahady". Ancestry.com. Provo, UT: Ancestry.com, LLC. September 16, 1967.
- Andres, Glenn M.; Callahan, Anne. "The Village Tour". A Walking History of Middlebury. Middlebury, VT: Middlebury College. Archived from the original on October 9, 2016.

=== Newspapers ===
- "Mahady Will Resign as Co-Ordinator of Romney Committee". Bennington Banner. Bennington, VT. United Press International. November 25, 1967.
- "Conduct Board Clears Attorney Frank Mahady". The Burlington Free Press. Burlington, VT. February 23, 1977.
- "Judge Rules Ex-Public defender Broke Law by Accepting Payment". The Burlington Free Press. Burlington, VT. Staff, Wire Reports. November 10, 1978.
- "Hartford Lawyer to Fill Court Vacancy". The Burlington Free Press. Burlington, VT. Associated Press. August 31, 1982.
- Schoch, Deborah (November 17, 1984). "Stafford Sit-In Defendants Cleared: 'Necessity Defense' Accepted by Jurors". The Burlington Free Press. Burlington, VT.
- Karvelas, David (August 14, 1987). "Mahady Gets High Court Nod". The Burlington Free Press. Burlington, VT.
- Allen, Susan (March 24, 1988). "Mahady Inquiry Expanded: Ex-Employees Agree Mahady Not Attentive". The Burlington Free Press. Burlington, VT.
- Karvelas, David (March 28, 1988). "Senate Rejection of Mahady Would be Ironic". The Burlington Free Press. Burlington, VT.
- Karvelas, David (April 1, 1988). "Mahady Withdraws Name". The Burlington Free Press. Burlington, VT.
- "Mahady Career". The Burlington Free Press. Burlington, VT. April 1, 1988.
- Karvelas, David (April 4, 1988). "A Few Last Words on the Mahady Nomination". The Burlington Free Press. Burlington, VT.
- Kirka, Danica (September 14, 1988). "High Court Seat Goes to Morse". The Burlington Free Press. Burlington, VT.
- Arabas, Jill (March 16, 1989). "Judge Asked About Payment". The Burlington Free Press. Burlington, VT. Associated Press.
- Donoghue, Mike (August 19, 1992). "Judge Mahady Dies at 53". The Burlington Free Press. Burlington, VT.
- Liley, Betsey (April 7, 1989). "Cashman, Mahady Retained on Bench". The Burlington Free Press. Burlington, VT.
- "Mahady File". The Burlington Free Press. Burlington, VT. August 19, 1992.
- Donoghue, Mike (August 19, 1992). "Civil Libertarian Dies of Cancer at 53 (Continued)". The Burlington Free Press. Burlington, VT.
- "Obituary, Frank Gordon Mahady". The Burlington Free Press. Burlington, VT. August 19, 1992.
- Smith, Robin (August 4, 2017). "Secrets from Island Pond's Chilling Raid: Kilmartin Shares Remembrances Of One Man's Role In The Hearings After The Raid". Caledonian Record. St. Johnsbury, VT.

=== Books ===
- Duffy, John J.; Hand, Samuel B.; Orth, Ralph H. (2003). The Vermont Encyclopedia. Hanover, NH: University Press of New England. ISBN 978-1-58465-086-7.
- Who's Who In American Law. Vol. 6: Judges. Chicago, IL: Marquis Who's Who. 1990 – via Google Books.

Political offices
Preceded by Thomas L. Hayes	Associate Justice of the Vermont Supreme Court; 1987–1988	Succeeded by James L. Morse
