= Jeffrey Amestoy =

American judge (born 1946)

Chief Justice of the Vermont Supreme Court
- In office 1997 – June 16, 2004
- Preceded by: Frederic W. Allen
- Succeeded by: Paul Reiber

24th Vermont Attorney General
- In office 1985–1997
- Preceded by: John J. Easton Jr.
- Succeeded by: William Sorrell

Personal details
- Born: Jeffrey L. Amestoy; July 24, 1946 (age 79) Rutland, Vermont, U.S.
- Party: Republican
- Spouse: Susan
- Children: 3
- Education: Hobart College (BA); Hastings Law School (JD); Harvard University (MPA)
- Profession: Jurist

Military service
- Allegiance: United States
- Branch/service: United States Army Reserve

Jeffrey Lee Amestoy (born July 24, 1946) is an American retired jurist from Vermont. He served as Vermont Attorney General from 1985 to 1997 and as chief justice of the Vermont Supreme Court from 1997 to 2004.

Amestoy is noted for having authored the majority opinion in Baker v. Vermont, the 1999 Vermont Supreme Court decision that led to the legalization of civil unions for same-sex partners in Vermont in 2000.

== Early life and education ==
Jeffrey Amestoy was born in Rutland, Vermont. He has Basque ancestry on his father's side. He received a B.A. from Hobart College in Geneva, New York, his J.D. from Hastings Law School at the University of California, and his Master of Public Administration degree from Harvard University. He served in the United States Army Reserve from 1968 to 1974.

== Legal career ==
A Republican, Amestoy served as counsel to the Governor of Vermont's Commission on the Administration of Justice from 1974 to 1976. He went on to become an assistant attorney general, a chief prosecutor of the Attorney General's Medicaid Fraud Division, and a commissioner of labor and industry.

In 1984, Amestoy ran successfully for Vermont Attorney General, defeating state Representative Bruce M. Lawlor in the general election. He served as attorney general from 1985 to 1997.

=== Vermont Supreme Court ===
Following the retirement of Frederic W. Allen, Governor Howard Dean appointed Amestoy to serve as chief justice of the Vermont Supreme Court. Amestoy was succeeded as Attorney General by William Sorrell.

As chief justice, Amestoy authored the opinion of the Vermont Supreme Court in Baker v. Vermont, 744 A.2d 864 (Vt. 1999), which held that the state's denial of marriage rights to same-sex couples violated the Vermont Constitution. The court ordered the Vermont legislature to either allow same-sex marriages or implement an alternative legal mechanism according similar rights to same-sex couples. On April 27, 2000, Gov. Howard Dean signed legislation making Vermont the first U.S. state to allow same-sex civil unions.

== Later career ==
Amestoy retired from the court on June 16, 2004, and was succeeded as chief justice by Paul L. Reiber. After his retirement, Amestoy returned to Harvard as a Fellow at the Institute of Politics and at the Harvard Kennedy School's Center for Public Leadership.

In 2020, Amestoy was appointed a special assistant attorney in State v. Forte, the longest running criminal case in Vermont's history. Forte's 1987 conviction for sexual assault of a twelve-year-old girl had been set aside when the trial judge asserted the female prosecutor was too emotional. When the Vermont Supreme Court rejected Attorney General Amestoy's appeal that the ruling was because of gender bias, the State refiled sexual assault charges. Forte avoided trial for three decades by fabricating medical claims. In 2022, Forte was charged with obstruction of justice but died before he could be brought to trial.

Amestoy is the author of Slavish Shore: The Odyssey of Richard Henry Dana Jr. (Harvard University Press, 2015). His article entitled "The Supreme Court Argument that Saved the Union: Richard Henry Dana Jr. and the Prize Cases" (Journal of Supreme Court History 2010) was awarded the Supreme Court Historical Society's Hughes-Gossett Prize. His 2025 book, Winters' Time: A Severed Head, a Secret Pledge, and the Murder that Brought America’s Most Famous Lawyer to Vermont, explores the 1926 trial and appeal of John Winters for the murder of Cecelia Gullivan in Vermont.

== Personal life ==
Amestoy and his wife, Susan, have three daughters, Katie, Christina, and Nancy.

== See also ==
- Vermont vs Hunt (1982)

Party political offices
Preceded by John J. Easton Jr.	Republican nominee for Vermont Attorney General; 1984, 1986, 1988, 1990, 1992, 1994, 1996	Succeeded by William Sorrell
Preceded by Bruce M. Lawlor	Democratic nominee for Vermont Attorney General; 1986	Succeeded by Ed Flanagan
Preceded by Ed Flanagan	Democratic nominee for Vermont Attorney General; 1990, 1992, 1994, 1996	Succeeded by William Sorrell
Legal offices
Preceded by John J. Easton Jr.	Attorney General of Vermont; 1985–1997	Succeeded by William H. Sorrell
Preceded by Frederic W. Allen	Chief Justice of the Vermont Supreme Court; 1997–2004	Succeeded by Paul Reiber
