= Bruce M. Lawlor =

American politician

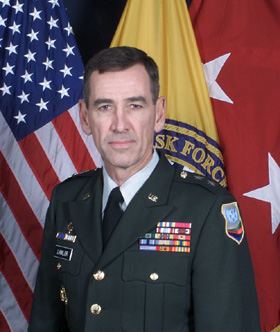
- Lawlor as commander of Joint Task Force-Civil Support
- Born: January 24, 1948 (age 78); Bellows Falls, Vermont, U.S.
- Military career
- Allegiance: United States of America
- Branch: United States Army
- Service years: 1967–2003
- Rank: Major General
- Commands: 1st Battalion 172nd Armor; 86th Armored Brigade; Joint Task Force-Civil Support
- Conflicts: Vietnam War; Global War on Terrorism
- Awards: Defense Superior Service Medal; Legion of Merit; Meritorious Service Medal; Army Commendation Medal
- Other work: Director of the Center for Technology, Security, and Public Policy, Virginia Polytechnic Institute and State University

Major General (Retired) Bruce M. Lawlor (born January 24, 1948) is a retired United States Army officer. He is prominent as the first commander of Joint Task Force-Civil Support. In addition, he was one of five White House staff members who wrote the plan to create the Department of Homeland Security, and he was the first DHS Chief of Staff.

== Early life and service in Vietnam ==
Bruce Michael Lawlor was born in Bellows Falls, Vermont on January 24, 1948, and graduated from Vermont Academy in 1966. He briefly attended the United States Military Academy before transferring to George Washington University, from which he received a Bachelor of Science degree in political science in 1970.

While attending George Washington University Lawlor was recruited by the Central Intelligence Agency. After graduation Lawlor became a full CIA staff member, took a paramilitary training course, and was trained as a foreign intelligence officer. Assigned to the Vietnam Desk at CIA headquarters, he was trained in Vietnam agent operations and took a Vietnamese language course. Lawlor was sent to South Vietnam in November 1971, and by the beginning of 1972 was working in counterintelligence in the Danang regional headquarters. In the summer of 1972 Lawlor became Police Special Branch advisor in Quang Nam Province, organizing paramilitary Special Branch operations and interrogations. He took part in Phoenix Program operations until 1973; he resigned from the CIA in 1974.

In 1974 Lawlor received a direct commission in the United States Navy Reserve as an intelligence officer.

Lawlor received his law degree from George Washington University Law School in 1975 and started a practice in Springfield, Vermont.

== Political career ==
A Democrat, Lawlor was a legal advisor to Governor Thomas P. Salmon. In 1980 Lawlor won election to the Vermont House of Representatives. He served two terms, 1981 to 1985.

In September 1984 Lawlor won the Democratic nomination for Vermont Attorney General. He lost the November general election to the Republican nominee, Jeffrey Amestoy.

== Continued military career ==
In 1979 Lawlor transferred his military membership to the Vermont Army National Guard. Initially assigned as the intelligence officer in an armor battalion, Lawlor became qualified in the Armor branch and advanced through command and staff positions including: commander of the 86th Armored Brigade's 1st Battalion 172nd Armor Battalion; commander of the 86th Brigade; special assistant to the Supreme Allied Commander, Europe; and assistant division commander of the 42nd Infantry Division. In 1986 he graduated from the Command and General Staff College.

In 1996 Lawlor received a Master of Science degree in National Security Studies from Norwich University as part of the Army War College's Senior Service College Fellowship Program (SSCF). In addition, he attended the National Security Fellows Program at Harvard University's John F. Kennedy School of Government.

== Later military career ==
From May 1998 to October 1999 Lawlor served as deputy director for operations, readiness and mobilization in the Army's Office of the Deputy Chief of Staff for Operations and Plans.

From October 1999 until October, 2001 Lawlor was commander of Joint Task Force-Civil Support, the first individual assigned to this position. In this assignment Lawlor oversaw creation of the Civil Support Team concept, an initiative that enables the National Guard to play a greater role in responding to domestic terrorism than has historically been allowed since the passage of the Posse Comitatus Act. Lawlor retired from the military in November, 2003.

== Effective dates of promotions ==
- Ensign, Navy Reserve, 11 November 1974
- Lieutenant Junior Grade, Navy Reserve, 11 November 1976
- Lieutenant, Navy Reserve, 1 December 1978
- First Lieutenant, Army National Guard, 2 January 1979
- Captain, Army National Guard, 2 May 1981
- Major, Army National Guard, 22 October 1986
- Lieutenant Colonel, Army National Guard, 22 October 1990
- Colonel, Army National Guard, 23 October 1993
- Brigadier General, Army National Guard, 1 October 1997
- Major General, Army National Guard, 6 October 2000

== Military awards and decorations ==
General Lawlor's awards and decorations include:

- Defense Superior Service Medal
- Legion of Merit
- Defense Meritorious Service Medal
- Meritorious Service Medal (with Silver Oak Leaf Cluster)
- Army Commendation Medal (with 1 Bronze Oak Leaf Cluster)
- Army Reserve Components Achievement Medal (with 4 Bronze Oak Leaf Clusters)
- National Defense Service Medal (with 2 Bronze Stars)
- Armed Forces Reserve Medal (with 1 Silver Hourglass Device)
- Army Service Ribbon
- Army Reserve Components Overseas Training Ribbon
- Republic of Vietnam Gallantry Cross (with 1 Gold and 1 Bronze Star)
- Vietnamese Honor Medal (First Class)

== Continued governmental career ==
Shortly after the September 11, 2001 terrorist attacks, Lawlor joined the White House staff to help plan and coordinate the response as senior director for protection and prevention in the Office of Homeland Security. While in this position Lawlor was one of the chief creators of the legislation that created the Department of Homeland Security. When DHS was officially founded in March, 2003 Lawlor was named its first Chief of Staff, and he served until being succeeded by J. Duncan Campbell in October, 2003.

In 2003 Lawlor earned a Doctor of Science degree in engineering management from George Washington University.

== Post governmental career ==
Since leaving DHS Lawlor has continued his involvement in national security affairs through both academia and private business, including: member of the board of advisors for the Global Panel Foundation; member of the Homeland Security Advisory Council (HSAC); chief executive officer of Centuria Corporation; distinguished service professor at the Stevens Institute of Technology; professor at the George Washington University; instructor at the Army War College; and director of the Center for Technology, Security, and Public Policy at Virginia Polytechnic Institute and State University (Virginia Tech); advisory board member for Patron Systems, Inc.; and chairman and chief executive officer of Community Research Associates, Inc. After leaving Virginia Tech, Lawlor was a senior associate at the Center for International and European Studies.

While with Virginia Tech, Lawlor resided in Arlington, Virginia and he later moved to Norfolk.

== External resources ==
- Defence Geospatial Intelligence Europe, GIS Event: Interview With Major General (Ret.) Bruce Lawlor (US Army) on YouTube, 2010

Party political offices
Vacant Title last held by Scott Skinner	Democratic nominee for Vermont Attorney General; 1984	Succeeded by Jeffrey Amestoy
Political offices
Preceded by Position established	Chief of Staff to the United States Secretary of Homeland Security; January 24, 2003–October 17, 2003	Succeeded by J. Duncan Campbell
