= Christina Nolan =

American attorney and politician (born 1979)

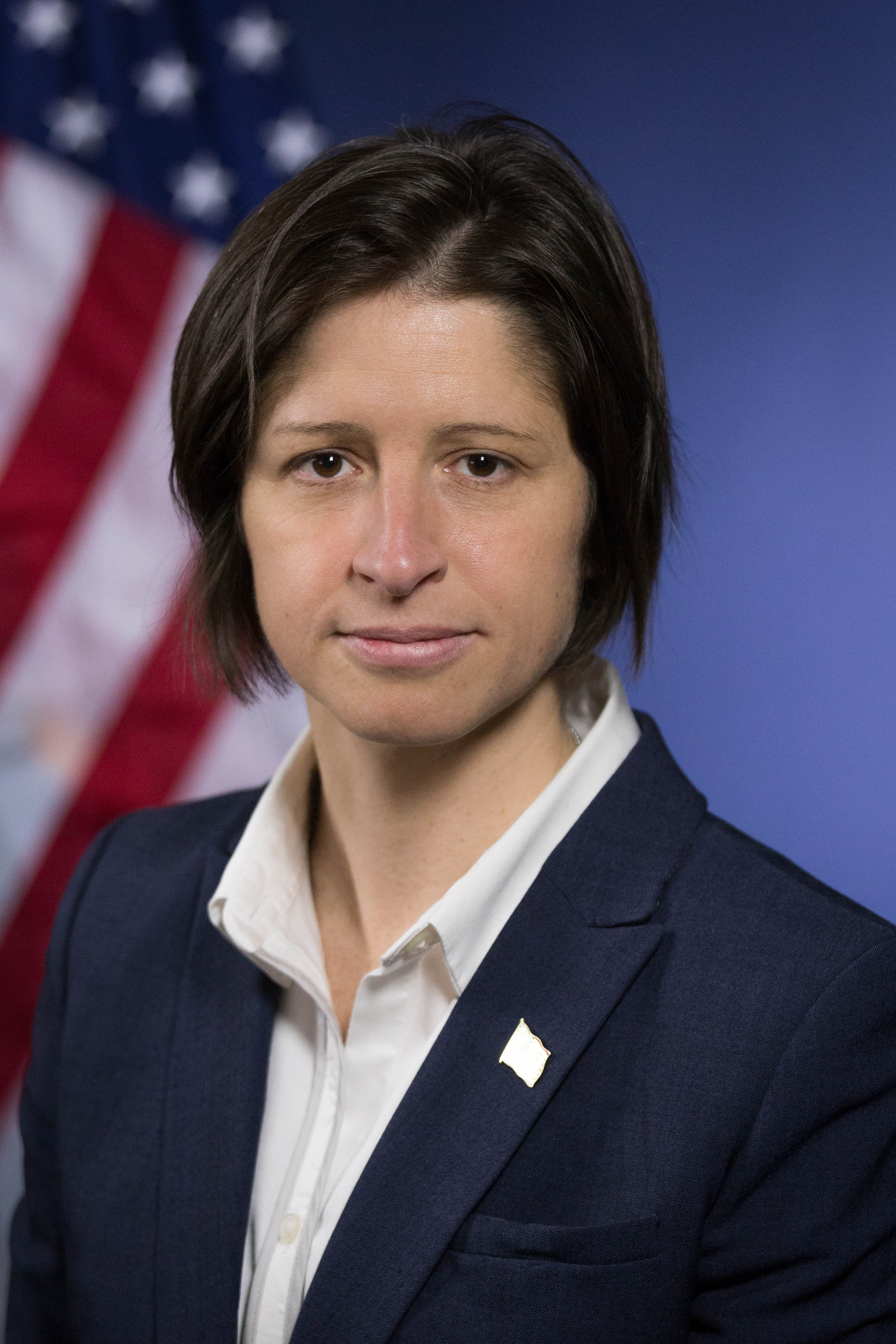

Associate Justice of the Vermont Supreme Court
- Incumbent
- Assumed office February 3, 2026
- Appointed by: Phil Scott
- Preceded by: Karen Carroll

United States Attorney for the District of Vermont
- In office November 27, 2017 – February 28, 2021
- President: Donald Trump; Joe Biden
- Preceded by: Eric Miller
- Succeeded by: Jonathan Ophardt (acting)

Personal details
- Born: Christina Elizabeth Nolan; September 26, 1979 (age 47) Burlington, Vermont, U.S.
- Party: Republican
- Domestic partner: Jill Barcia
- Education: University of Vermont (BA); Boston College (JD)

Christina Elizabeth Nolan (born September 26, 1979) is an American attorney and politician who has served as a justice of the Vermont Supreme Court since 2026. She previously served as the United States Attorney for the District of Vermont from 2017 to 2021. Prior to becoming the U.S. Attorney, she was an Assistant United States Attorney in the District of Vermont, where she prosecuted a variety of criminal cases. A member of the Republican Party, she was a candidate for the United States Senate in the 2022 election, losing the Republican primary. Nolan is considered a moderate Republican, and in her Senate campaign was endorsed by Governor Phil Scott.

== Early life and education ==
Born in Burlington, Vermont, to her parents Wendall and Stephanie, Nolan attended the Mater Christi School in Burlington as a child. Nolan is a 1997 graduate of Rice Memorial High School in South Burlington, and was admitted to the high school's Athletic Hall of Fame in 2007 for her accomplishments in track and field and basketball.

She graduated summa cum laude from the University of Vermont in 2001 with a Bachelor of Arts degree in political science and history. In 2004, she received her Juris Doctor degree magna cum laude from the Boston College Law School. Nolan was a senior editor of the Boston College Law Review and was admitted to the Order of the Coif.

== Career ==
After graduating from law school, she served as law clerk for Judge F. Dennis Saylor IV on the United States District Court for the District of Massachusetts.

Nolan previously served as an Assistant District Attorney in Middlesex County, Massachusetts. From 2005 to 2009, Nolan worked as a litigation associate at Goodwin Procter in Boston, where she specialized in white collar criminal defense. She served as an Assistant United States Attorney for the District of Vermont from 2010 to 2017. Nolan was recommended for the position of U.S. Attorney by U.S. Senator Patrick Leahy and Vermont Governor Phil Scott. She became the first woman to serve as U.S. Attorney for the District of Vermont, confirmed by the United States Senate unanimously. As a federal prosecutor, Nolan received the New England Narcotic Enforcement Officer's Association Award for Outstanding Contribution two times.

During Nolan's tenure as a federal prosecutor, she managed Vermont's first ever federal hate crime conviction. Her office also indicted and found convictions for those behind the Jay Peak scandal, the largest case of financial fraud in Vermont's history. From October 2018 to February 2020, Nolan's office coordinated with law enforcement in Operation "Fury Road" along Interstate 91. The effort resulted in 82 arrests on federal charges, as well as the seizure of 128 firearms, 7,511 rounds of ammunition and “kilograms” of heroin, fentanyl and crack cocaine.

On February 8, 2021, officials of the new Biden administration requested the resignations of all but two U.S. Attorneys, as is typical for incoming presidential administrations. On February 16, Nolan announced her resignation, effective February 28.

In January 2022, Nolan filed candidacy paperwork with the Federal Election Commission, reflecting that she was exploring a run for the Republican nomination for U.S. Senator from Vermont in 2022. On February 22, 2022, she formally announced her candidacy in an exclusive interview with Fox News, followed by release of a three-minute campaign video. Despite endorsements from prominent Vermont Republicans such as incumbent Vermont governor Phil Scott and former governor Jim Douglas, Nolan lost the Republican primary to Gerald Malloy, a more conservative candidate, by a small margin.

On 5 January 2026, Vermont Governor Phil Scott appointed Nolan to the state's Supreme Court. On 3 February 2026 Nolan's appointment was confirmed by the Vermont Senate.

== Political positions ==
Nolan has identified as "an independent thinker" and has expressed willingness to work across the aisle. She identifies as an environmentalist and supports LGBTQ+ rights. Nolan has voiced support for a public healthcare option, but she opposes Medicare for All. If elected to the senate, Nolan did not commit to voting for Mitch McConnell for Republican leader.

Nolan also voiced her support for Judge Ketanji Brown Jackson's nomination to the Supreme Court of the United States; only three Republican Senators voted to confirm her.

Nolan had refused to disclose whether she voted for Donald Trump, who nominated her for U.S. Attorney, stating that it might cast doubt on her impartiality.

== Personal life ==
Nolan is gay. She has been in a relationship with her partner, Jill Barcia, since 2005.

Legal offices
Preceded by Karen Carroll	Associate Justice of the Vermont Supreme Court; 2026–present	Incumbent
