= Community College of Vermont =

Public community college in Vermont, U.S.

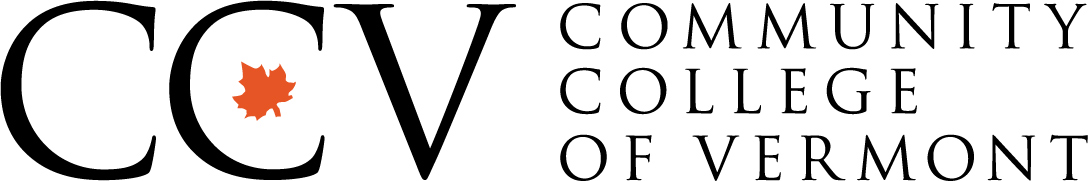
- Type: Public community college
- Established: 1970; 56 years ago
- Chancellor: Sophie Zdatny
- President: Joyce Judy
- Administrative staff: 175
- Students: 5,104
- Location: Montpelier, Vermont, United States
- Campus: 12 campuses across the state
- Website: ccv.edu

The Community College of Vermont (CCV) is a public community college within the Vermont State Colleges System. It is the second-largest higher education institution in the state, enrolling approximately 7,000 students each semester. CCV operates 12 academic centers across Vermont and offers a wide range of online learning opportunities.

== History ==
The state created the Vermont Regional Community College Commission (VRCCC) in 1970. Peter Plympton Smith was hired as the first president. VRCCC opened in Montpelier with 10 courses and 50 students.In 1975, CCV earned accreditation from the New England Association of Schools and Colleges.

In 1992, CCV deployed the "virtual campus", which linked its 13 locations via a computer network. In 1996, CCV offered its first online course: Introduction to Political Science.

In 1984, CCV's commencement topped 100 graduates and its twelfth site opened in Middlebury. In 1993, enrollment at CCV topped 5000 students. In 2003, students aged 22 or younger reached 33% of all enrollment at CCV. In 2004, enrollment at CCV topped 10,000 students. In the fall of 2010, CCV offered a new associate degree in Environmental Science.

In 2008, CCV purchased the building of the defunct Woodbury College in Montpelier.

In 2010, CCV built a new building in Winooski, replacing the former Burlington building.

In 2014, CCV moved its Brattleboro campus to the renovated Brooks House, in the downtown business district of the town.

=== Faculty unionization ===
In 2006, the American Federation of Teachers, which represents instructors at other colleges in the Vermont State Colleges system, organized a unionizing campaign. The college opposed the unionization effort partially through a mailing effort, and the majority of the faculty voted not to unionize in September 2006.

A renewed unionization campaign was undertaken by the American Federation of Teachers in 2015. An election held in October 2017 resulted in overwhelming faculty support for unionization, with 69 percent of faculty voting in favor.

== Locations ==
Location of Community College of Vermont campuses.
- Bennington
- Brattleboro
- Middlebury
- Montpelier
- Morrisville
- Newport
- Rutland
- Springfield
- St. Albans
- St. Johnsbury
- White River Junction
- Winooski
