= Woodbury College =

Former College in Montpelier, Vermont, US

Woodbury College was an institute of higher learning in Montpelier, Vermont, United States.

== History ==
It was established in 1975 as Woodbury Associates by Larry Mandell, Robert Brower, & James Ritvo. In 1984, it received regional accreditation from the New England Association of Schools and Colleges. It was also accredited by the New England Commission of Higher Education.

In 1993 it began offering associate's degrees with bachelor's degrees first being offered in 2000. At the time of its closure, 42 percent of the classes were offered online, though traditionally the college had mostly offered in-person instruction.

== Location ==
It was originally located at 659 Elm Street in Montpelier and later, in 1987, purchased a barn located across the street at 391 Elm Street.

== Closure ==
In August 2008, it merged with Champlain College, where its 125 students were transferred. The campus was purchased by the Community College of Vermont.
