= Paul Reiber =

American judge (born 1947)

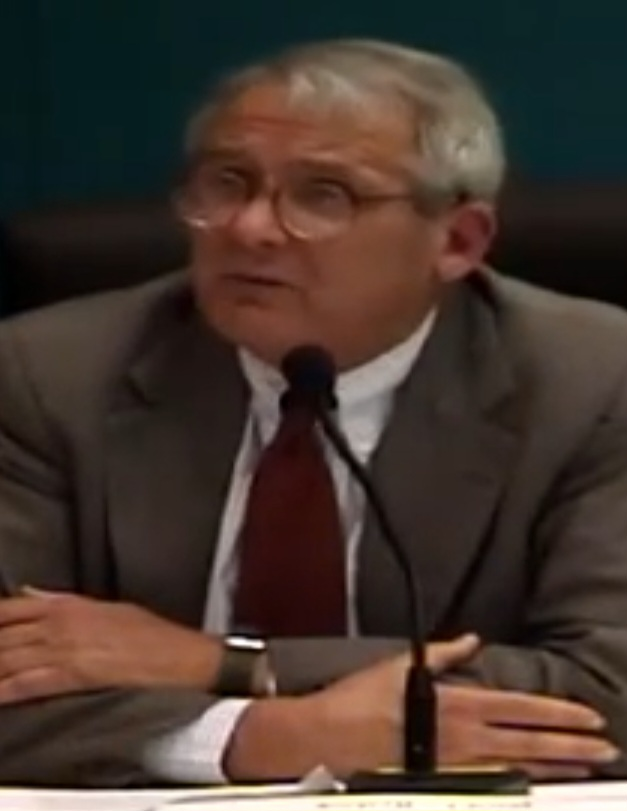

Chief Justice of the Vermont Supreme Court
- Incumbent
- Assumed office December 17, 2004
- Appointed by: Jim Douglas
- Preceded by: Jeffrey Amestoy

Personal details
- Born: June 20, 1947 (age 79) Pittsburgh, Pennsylvania, U.S.
- Education: Hampden-Sydney College (BA); Suffolk University (JD)

Paul L. Reiber (born June 20, 1947) is the chief justice of the Vermont Supreme Court. Reiber graduated from Hampden-Sydney College in 1970 and from Suffolk University Law School in Boston, Massachusetts in 1974. Reiber was in private practice in Rutland until becoming a partner in Kenlan, Schwiebert & Facey in 1986. He also served for six years on Vermont's Judicial Nominating Board. He was appointed by Governor Jim Douglas as an associate justice in October 2003. Governor Douglas swore him in as chief justice on December 17, 2004.

Legal offices
Preceded by Jeffrey Amestoy	Chief Justice of the Vermont Supreme Court; 2004–present	Incumbent
