= Brian L. Burgess =

American judge (1951)

Brian Louis Burgess (born January 14, 1951) is a retired Associate Justice of the Vermont Supreme Court. He served on the court from 2005 to 2013.

== Biography ==
Burgess was born in Washington, D.C. He earned his Bachelor of Arts degree from the College of the Holy Cross in 1973 and his Juris Doctor from the Villanova University School of Law in 1976. He was admitted to the bar, and practiced law with the firm of Timothy J. O'Connor Jr. from 1976 to 1978. He was staff attorney for Vermont's Department of Social Welfare in 1978 and state Assistant Attorney General for fiscal recoveries and Medicaid fraud prosecutions from 1978 to 1983.

He was the state's Deputy Commissioner and then Commissioner of Labor and Industry from 1983 to 1985. From 1985 to 1992, Burgess served as Vermont's Deputy Attorney General for white-collar and environmental criminal prosecutions. In 1992, he was appointed a judge of the Vermont District Court, and in 2004 the state Supreme Court designated him as Chief Trial Judge, with responsibility for monitoring court operations and controlling work assignments for Vermont's state courts.

In 2005, Burgess was nominated to serve as an associate justice on the Vermont Supreme Court. He remained on the bench until retiring in 2013. According to news accounts at the time of his elevation to the Supreme Court, Burgess was identified with the Republican Party.

== Family ==
Burgess is the son of Louis Burgess and Barbara (Babcock) Burgess.

In 1977, Burgess married Maureen Elizabeth O’Connor of Adams, Massachusetts.

== See also ==
- Vermont vs Hunt (1982)
