= Shelburne (CDP), Vermont =

Census-designated place in Vermont, United States

Shelburne, Vermont
- Census-designated place
- Location within Vermont Location within the United States
- Coordinates: 44°22′50″N 73°14′15″W
- Country: United States
- State: Vermont
- County: Chittenden
- Town: Shelburne

Area
  - Total: 7.8 sq mi (20.2 km^{2})
  - Land: 7.2 sq mi (18.6 km^{2})
  - Water: 0.62 sq mi (1.6 km^{2})
- Elevation: 161 ft (49 m)

Population (2020)
  - Total: 6,178
- Time zone: UTC-5 (Eastern (EST))
  - Summer (DST): UTC-4 (EDT)
- ZIP Code: 05482
- Area code: 802
- FIPS code: 50-64225
- GNIS feature ID: 2586653

Shelburne is a census-designated place (CDP) comprising the central village and surrounding suburban land in the town of Shelburne, Chittenden County, Vermont, United States. As of the 2020 census, the CDP had a population of 6,178, out of 7,717 in the entire town.

== Geography ==
The CDP is in western Chittenden County, in the central part of the town of Shelburne, extending to the north and south borders of the town. U.S. Route 7 runs the length of the CDP, leading north into South Burlington and south into the town of Charlotte. Downtown Burlington is 7 miles (11 km) to the north. The Shelburne Museum is in the southwest part of the CDP, on the west side of Route 7.
