= Shelburne, Vermont =

- Town
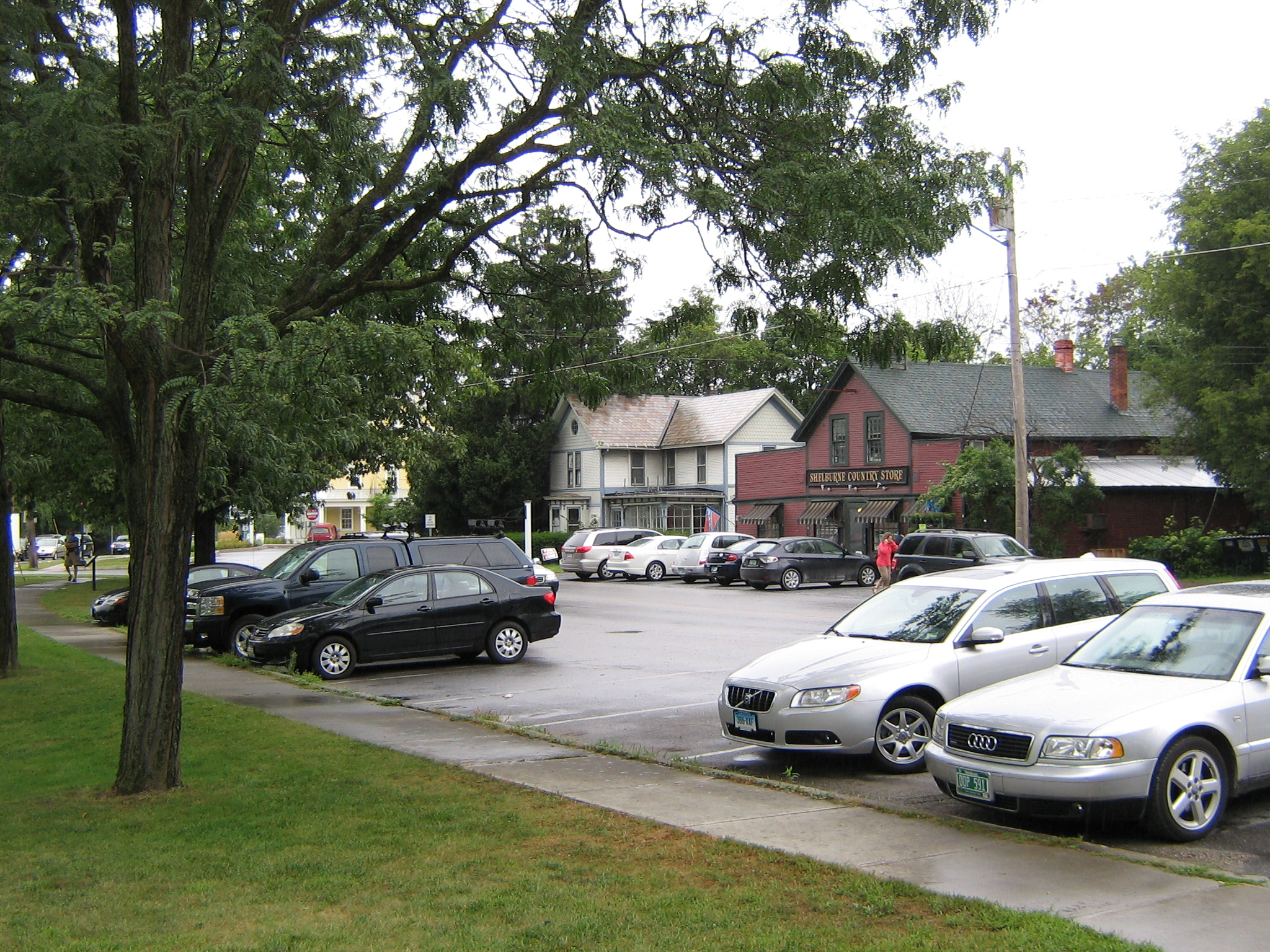
- A section of central Shelburne

- Location in Chittenden County and the state of Vermont.
- Coordinates: 44°22′53″N 73°14′32″W
- Country: United States
- State: Vermont
- County: Chittenden
- Communities: Shelburne; Shelburne Falls

Area
  - Total: 45.1 sq mi (116.7 km^{2})
  - Land: 24.3 sq mi (63.0 km^{2})
  - Water: 20.8 sq mi (53.8 km^{2})
- Elevation: 105 ft (32 m)

Population (2020)
  - Total: 7,717
  - Density: 317/sq mi (122.5/km^{2})
- Time zone: UTC-5 (Eastern (EST))
  - Summer (DST): UTC-4 (EDT)
- ZIP code: 05482
- Area code: 802
- FIPS code: 50-64300
- GNIS feature ID: 1462206
- Website: www.shelburnevt.org

Shelburne is a town in Chittenden County, Vermont, United States. Located along the shores of Lake Champlain, Shelburne's town center lies approximately 7 miles (11 km) south of the city center of Burlington, the most populous city in the U.S. state of Vermont. As of the 2020 census, the population of Shelburne was 7,717.

The main settlement of Shelburne in the center of town is a census-designated place (CDP), with a population of 6,178 at the 2020 census. Shelburne municipality has the highest median income in both Chittenden County and the Burlington metropolitan area.

== History ==
Shelburne was chartered by New Hampshire, August 18, 1763, to Jesse Hallock and 64 associates by governor Benning Wentworth. The name "Shelburne" or "Shelburn" was chosen to honor William Petty, 2nd Earl of Shelburne, a celebrated nobleman of the British parliament and Prime Minister. According to the charter, the town was to have an area of 23,500 acres (95.1 km^{2}), or a tract a little over 6 square miles (15.5 km^{2}), but owing to a blunder on the part of the surveyors, it was shorn of a large portion of its possessions.

From the beginning, Shelburne's economy was based on farming. With the clearing of land and burning of logs the town experienced a potash boom. A carding and fulling mill, a gristmill, a sawmill, and a blacksmith shop were erected on the La Platte River at Shelburne Falls. In 1811, a few Merino sheep imported from Spain led to an upsurge in sheep raising. Orchards and fruit growing became a major source of income for the farmers, with some 17,740 trees in 1880. Following the War of 1812, commerce on the lake expanded rapidly.

The Lake Champlain Transportation Company established its shipyard at Shelburne Harbor and launched its first steamboat, the General Green, in 1825; this was followed by ten others before the Ticonderoga in 1906. In 1955, the Ticonderoga was moved overland to the Shelburne Museum, where it is now on display.

== Geography ==
According to the U.S. Census Bureau, the town has a total area of 45.1 square miles (116.7 km^{2}), of which 24.3 square miles (63.0 km^{2}) is land and 20.8 square miles (53.8 km^{2}), or 46.06%, is water (primarily Lake Champlain, but also including Shelburne Pond in the eastern part of town).

== Government and politics ==
The town had the highest voter turnout in Vermont in the general election of 2008 with 89.4%. It had the highest number of registered voters among the top ten towns with the highest turnout. It also had the second-highest percentage of people voting absentee of any town in Vermont, 50.2%.

In the Vermont Democratic Party presidential primary of 2016, the town was the worst-performing of all municipalities in both Chittenden County and the Burlington metro area for U.S. senator Bernie Sanders of nearby Burlington. Bernie Sanders received 76.6% of the Democratic primary vote in the town and former U.S. secretary of state Hillary Clinton received her highest level of support for any municipality in the county and metro area, at 23.1%. Kathryn Webb and Jessica Brumsted, both Democrats, represent the town in the Vermont House of Representatives.

== Demographics ==
Historical population
Census	Pop.	Note	%±
1790	389		—
1800	723		85.9%
1810	987		36.5%
1820	936		−5.2%
1830	1,123		20.0%
1840	1,089		−3.0%
1850	1,257		15.4%
1860	1,178		−6.3%
1870	1,190		1.0%
1880	1,096		−7.9%
1890	1,300		18.6%
1900	1,202		−7.5%
1910	1,097		−8.7%
1920	997		−9.1%
1930	1,006		0.9%
1940	1,010		0.4%
1950	1,365		35.1%
1960	1,805		32.2%
1970	3,728		106.5%
1980	5,000		34.1%
1990	5,871		17.4%
2000	6,944		18.3%
2010	7,144		2.9%
2020	7,717		8.0%
U.S. Decennial Census

As of the census of 2000, there were 6,944 people, 2,632 households, and 1,845 families residing in the town. The population density was 285.6 people per square mile (110.3/km^{2}). There were 2,741 housing units at an average density of 112.8 per square mile (43.5/km^{2}). The racial makeup of the town was 97.60% White, 0.23% African American, 0.10% Native American, 1.01% Asian, 0.32% from other races, and 0.75% from two or more races. Hispanic or Latino of any race were 0.86% of the population.

There were 2,632 households, out of which 37.6% had children under the age of 18 living with them, 61.3% were couples living together and joined in either marriage or civil union, 6.7% had a female householder with no husband present, and 29.9% were non-families. 22.9% of all households were made up of individuals, and 11.7% had someone living alone who was 65 years of age or older. The average household size was 2.58 and the average family size was 3.08.

In the town, the population was spread out, with 27.6% under the age of 18, 3.9% from 18 to 24, 25.9% from 25 to 44, 27.2% from 45 to 64, and 15.4% who were 65 years of age or older. The median age was 41 years. For every 100 females, there were 90.9 males. For every 100 females age 18 and over, there were 86.3 males.

== Economy ==
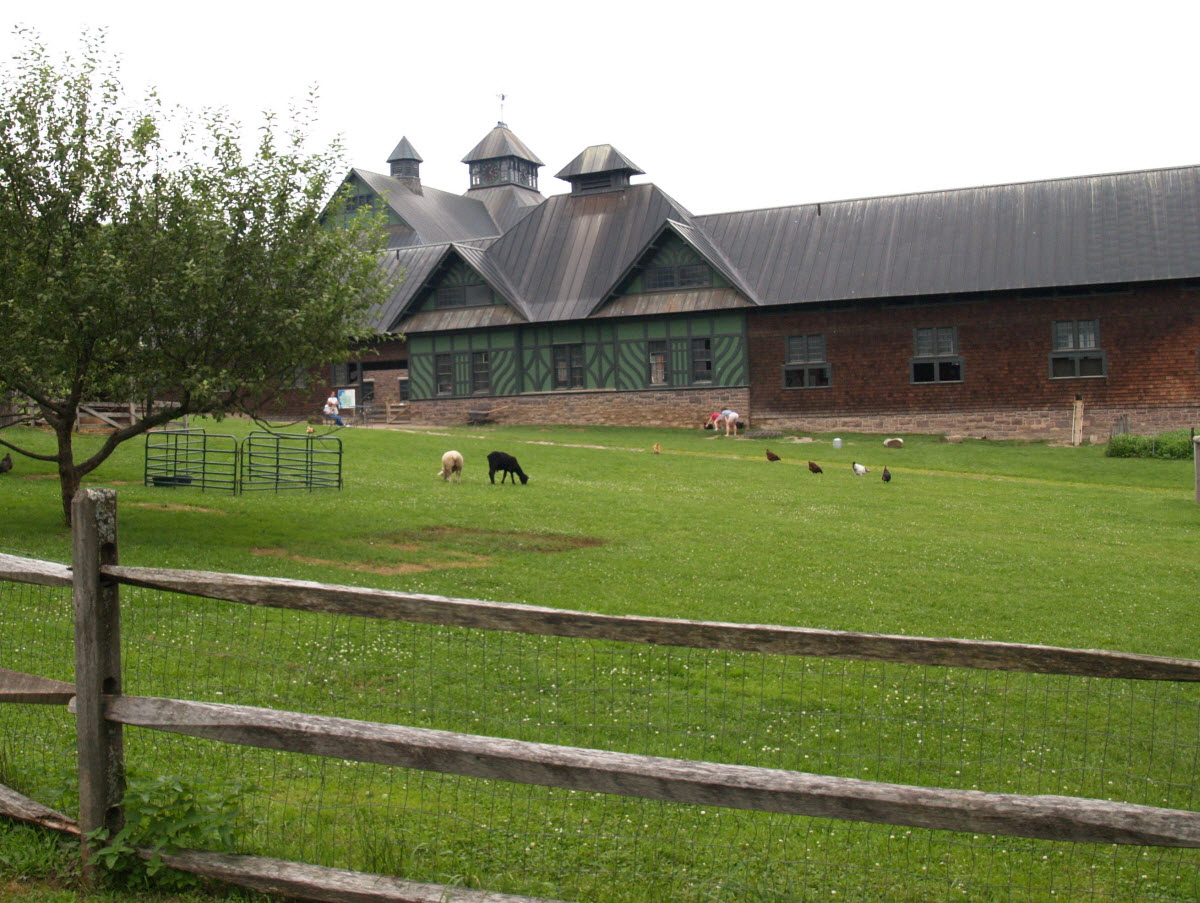
Shelburne Farms

The town contains businesses, including manufacturers, service providers, retail establishments and the state's largest continuing care retirement community. In 2007 a historic inn was converted into a mixed use array of offices, small retail, and a restaurant.

=== Personal income ===
In 2016, the median income for a household in the town was $98,898, and the median income for a family was $118,492. Males had a median income of $50,085 versus $28,428 for females. The per capita income for the town was $55,638. About 2.9% of families and 4.9% of the population were below the poverty line, including 2.7% of those under age 18 and 7.6% of those age 65 or over.

=== Tourism ===
The town has three major tourist attractions: the Shelburne Museum, Shelburne Farms, and the Vermont Teddy Bear Company. Also attracting tourists to Shelburne are: Shelburne Vineyard and Fiddlehead Brewery.

The town maintains a beach on Lake Champlain which has a boat launch and nature park.

Transportation

U.S. Route 7 (Shelburne Road) crosses the center of town, leading north into South Burlington and south towards Vergennes.

Bus service is provided by Green Mountain Transit.

== Schools ==
Public:

- Shelburne Community School (elementary and middle school)

The town is part of the Champlain Valley School District and sends students of high school age to Champlain Valley Union High School in Hinesburg.

Private:

- Vermont Day School
- Lake Champlain Waldorf School

Preschools:

- Heartworks (Shelburne campus)
- Shelburne Nursery School

Other Schools:

- Shelburne Craft School

== Media ==
The Shelburne News is a weekly newspaper mailed to all residents of Shelburne. It was established in 1967. In 2017, it was sold to the owners of the Stowe Reporter who then created the Vermont Community Newspaper Group in 2019.

== Notable people ==
- Frederic W. Allen, Chief Justice of the Vermont Supreme Court
- Tom Atwood, photographer
- John L. Barstow, Governor of Vermont
- Sam Bartlett, musician and author
- Michael Dante DiMartino, animation director and author
- Henry U. Harder, Adjutant General of Vermont
- Isaac R. Harrington, mayor of Buffalo, New York
- William C. Hill (1917–1998), Associate Justice of the Vermont Supreme Court
- Madeleine Kunin, 77th governor of Vermont (1985–1991)
- Kevin Lepage, stock car racer
- Lucius Lyon, one of the first two U.S. senators from Michigan
- Ezra Meech (1773–1856), U.S. Congressman
- George A. Meigs (1816–1897), businessman in Washington territory and state
- Megan Nick, Olympic bronze medalist in Aerial skiing
- Almon Heath Read (1790–1844), U.S. Congressman
- Barbara Snelling, 76th lieutenant governor of Vermont (1992–1996)
- Richard Snelling, 78th governor of Vermont (1977–1985, 1991)
- Jane Swift, 69th lieutenant governor of Massachusetts
- Electra Havemeyer Webb (1888–1960), founder of the Shelburne Museum
- William Seward Webb (1851–1926), founder of Shelburne Farms
