= Frederic W. Allen =

American judge (1926–2016)

Chief Justice of the Vermont Supreme Court
- In office 1984–1997
- Preceded by: Franklin S. Billings Jr.
- Succeeded by: Jeffrey Amestoy

Personal details
- Born: Frederick Walter Allen; May 31, 1926 Burlington, Vermont, U.S.
- Died: April 9, 2016 (aged 89) Shelburne, Vermont, U.S.
- Education: Burlington High School; Alma College; Miami University; Boston University School of Law
- Profession: Lawyer, judge

Military service
- Allegiance: United States
- Branch/service: United States Navy

Frederic Walter Allen (May 31, 1926 – April 9, 2016) was an American lawyer and judge who served as chief justice of the Vermont Supreme Court.

== Biography ==
Frederic Walter Allen was born in Burlington, Vermont on May 31, 1926. He graduated from Burlington High School in 1944, where he was class president, played football, ran the high hurdles for the track and field team, and captained the basketball team.

After graduation Allen joined the United States Navy, and took part in the V-12 Navy College Training Program for officer candidates at Alma College in Michigan, and Miami University of Ohio. He graduated from Miami University in 1948.

Allen graduated from Boston University School of Law in 1951, was admitted to the bar, and began to practice in Burlington. He served on the Burlington Board of Aldermen in the 1950s. In 1980 he was named a Fellow of the American College of Trial Lawyers.

In 1984, Governor Richard A. Snelling appointed Allen to serve as Chief Justice of the Vermont Supreme Court, and he served until reaching the mandatory retirement age in 1997. Allen was credited with restoring order and stability to the court after a period of turmoil; misconduct charges had been filed against three associate justices, and a fourth who had received an interim appointment resigned when it became clear that he would not win confirmation from the Vermont Senate. A large backlog had also developed during this period, and Allen was praised for his efforts to dispose of the overdue cases.

Allen was a trustee of Middlebury College, and received honorary degrees from Middlebury College and Vermont Law School. For several years he served on the Civil Rules Committee of the Vermont Supreme Court, the Vermont Board of Bar Examiners, and the Vermont Judicial Conduct Board.

Allen died in Shelburne, Vermont on April 9, 2016.

Legal offices
Preceded by Franklin S. Billings, Jr.	Chief Justice of the Vermont Supreme Court; 1984–1997	Succeeded by Jeffrey Amestoy
