= Ernest W. Gibson III =

American attorney and judge (1927–2020)

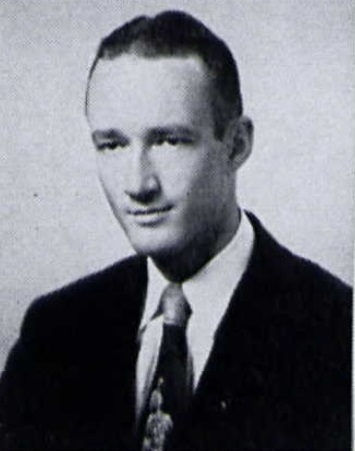
- Gibson as a first year student at Harvard Law School in 1954

Associate Justice of the Vermont Supreme Court
- In office February 11, 1983 – July 31, 1997
- Preceded by: Franklin S. Billings Jr.
- Succeeded by: Marilyn Skoglund

Judge of the Vermont Superior Court
- In office 1972–1983
- Preceded by: Rudolph J. Daley
- Succeeded by: Alan W. Cheever

Chairman of the Vermont Public Service Board
- In office 1963–1972
- Preceded by: John D. Paterson
- Succeeded by: William Gilbert

Member of the Vermont House of Representatives from Brattleboro
- In office 1961–1963
- Preceded by: Robert T. Gannett
- Succeeded by: Anthony C. Buraczynski

State's Attorney of Windham County, Vermont
- In office 1957–1961
- Preceded by: John S. Burgess
- Succeeded by: John A. Rocray

Personal details
- Born: Ernest Willard Gibson III; September 23, 1927 Brattleboro, Vermont
- Died: May 17, 2020 (aged 92) Northfield, Vermont
- Resting place: Morningside Cemetery, Brattleboro, Vermont
- Party: Republican
- Spouse(s): Charlotte Elaine Hungerford (m. 1960-2020), his death
- Children: 3
- Parent(s): Ernest W. Gibson Jr. Dorothy P. (Switzer) Gibson
- Relatives: Ernest Willard Gibson (grandfather)
- Education: Yale University; Harvard Law School
- Profession: Attorney

Military service
- Allegiance: United States of America
- Branch/service: United States Army
- Years of service: 1945–1946 (Army); 1951–1953 (Army); 1953–1956 (Reserve); 1956–1971 (National Guard)
- Rank: Major (Army)
- Unit: United States Army; United States Army Reserve; Vermont Army National Guard
- Battles/wars: World War II; Korean War

Ernest Willard Gibson III (September 23, 1927 – May 17, 2020) was an attorney and judge who served as an associate justice of the Vermont Supreme Court.

== Early life ==
Ernest Willard Gibson III was born in Brattleboro, Vermont on September 23, 1927, the son of Ernest W. Gibson Jr. and Dorothy P. (Switzer) Gibson. Ernest Gibson Jr. served as Governor of Vermont and a judge of the United States District Court for the District of Vermont. The grandfather of Ernest Gibson III, Ernest Willard Gibson, was a member of the United States House of Representatives and a United States senator.

== Start of career ==
Gibson graduated from Washington, DC's Western High School in 1945. He served in the United States Army at the end of World War II (1945 to 1946), and attained the rank of technical sergeant. He received his bachelor's degree from Yale University in 1951, and served in the Army again during the Korean War, this time as a captain of field artillery in the 45th Infantry Division, for which he received the Bronze Star Medal. Gibson received his law degree from Harvard Law School in 1956, and was admitted to the bar the same year. Gibson continued his military career as a member of the Vermont Army National Guard, and attained the rank of major in the Judge Advocate General branch before retiring in 1971.

== Political career ==
A Republican, he served as state's attorney for Windham County from 1957 to 1961. He was elected to the Vermont House of Representatives in 1960 and 1962. Gibson served one full term and part of another, 1961 to 1963, and he was appointed chairman of the Judiciary Committee in 1963. In the House, Gibson joined a group known as the "Young Turks", members who worked for the passage of progressive legislation regardless of party affiliation; the Young Turks were instrumental in ending the Republican Party's 100-year grip on statewide power by electing Philip H. Hoff as governor in 1962.

Gibson was Chairman of the Vermont Public Service Board from 1963 to 1972.

== Judicial career ==
In 1972, Gibson was appointed a judge of the Vermont Superior Court, and he served until 1983.

In 1983, Justice Franklin S. Billings Jr. of the Vermont Supreme Court was appointed as chief justice. Gibson was nominated to replace Billings as an Associate Justice, and took office on February 11, 1983. He served on the court until retiring on July 31, 1997.

=== Controversy ===
In 1986 and 1987, Gibson and two other justices, William C. Hill and Thomas L. Hayes, were accused of misconduct, alleged to have tailored decisions to suit the wishes of an assistant judge in Chittenden County, and to have helped her cover up padding her pay; the assistant judge, Jane Wheel, was supposed to be wielding undue influence over the justices. Hill retired, and Hayes died before the charges could be resolved. (Wheel was convicted on charges arising from the case; Hill was found to have violated rules regarding judicial conduct.) Gibson was overwhelmingly reappointed to the Supreme Court in March 1987, and in July 1987, Vermont's Judicial Conduct Board dropped the charges against him.

=== Later career ===
In January 1997, Gibson administered the oath of office to Howard Dean, who had been reelected as governor in 1996. Gibson served until reaching the mandatory retirement age of 70, and was succeeded by Marilyn Skoglund.

== Personal life ==
Gibson was Chancellor of the Episcopal Diocese of Vermont from 1977 to 1998 and President of the Board of Trustees of the Diocese from 1991 to 1998. In 1960 he married Charlotte Elaine Hungerford. They were the parents of three children: Margaret, Mary, and John. He died in Northfield, Vermont on May 17, 2020, and was buried at Morningside Cemetery in Brattleboro.

== Sources ==
=== Internet ===
- "Ernest W. Gibson III in Vermont, Birth Records, 1909-2008". Ancestry.com. Provo, UT: Ancestry.com, LLC.
- "Ernest W. Gibson III and Charlotte Elaine Hungerford in California Marriage Index, 1960-1985". Ancestry.com. Provo, UT: Ancestry.com, LLC.
- "Margaret Grace Gibson in Vermont, Birth Records, 1909-2008". Ancestry.com. Provo, UT: Ancestry.com, LLC.
- "Mary Helen Gibson in Vermont, Birth Records, 1909-2008". Ancestry.com. Provo, UT: Ancestry.com, LLC.
- "John Willard Gibson in Vermont, Birth Records, 1909-2008". Ancestry.com. Provo, UT: Ancestry.com, LLC.

=== Newspapers ===
- Myers, Ed (November 6, 1969). "Judge Gibson to be Buried Friday in Brattleboro". Burlington Free Press. Burlington, VT. p. 1.
- Graff, Chris (February 3, 1983). "Gibson Named to Court". Burlington Free Press. Burlington, VT. Associated Press. p. 1.
- "High Court Drops Charges Against Gibson". Burlington Free Press. Burlington, VT. August 29, 1987. p. 21.
- Graff, Christopher (May 10, 1988). "Former Vermont Supreme Court Justice Found in Violation of Conduct Rules". Associated Press News.
- Remsen, Nancy; Lisberg, Adam (January 10, 1997). "Dean Wants Action This Term". Burlington Free Press. Burlington, VT. p. 1.
- Graff, Christopher (December 29, 1997). "1997 Was Year of Woman". Burlington Free Press. Burlington, VT. Associated Press. p. 9.
- O'Connor, Kevin (May 19, 2020). "Former Supreme Court justice Ernest W. Gibson III dies at 92". VTDigger.com. Burlington, VT.
- "Obituary: Ernest W. Gibson III, Longtime Public Servant and Supreme Court Justice". VT Digger. Montpelier, VT. May 17, 2020.
- "Ernest W. Gibson III Obituary". Burlington Free Press. Burlington, VT. May 17, 2020 – via Legacy.com.

=== Books ===
- Thomas, Richard C. (1969). Vermont Legislative Directory, 1969. Montpelier, VT: Vermont Secretary of State. p. 640.
- Director of the National Guard Bureau (1971). Army National Guard Register. Provo, UT: Ancestry.com, LLC. p. 105.
- Davis, Sumner Augustus (1973). Barnabas Davis (1599–1685) and His Descendants. Talladega, AL: S. A. Davis. p. 202.
- Milne, James F. (1995). Vermont Legislative Directory, 1995. Montpelier, VT: Vermont Secretary of State. p. 338.
- Hand, Samuel B.; Marro, Anthony; Terry, Stephen C. (2011). Philip Hoff: How Red Turned Blue in the Green Mountain State. Hanover, NH: University Press of New England. pp. 28–30. ISBN 978-1-61168-032-4.

=== Magazines ===
- Marchant, Robert J. (September 1, 2010). "Tribute to David A. Gibson" (PDF). The Legislative Administrator. Milwaukee, WI: American Society of Legislative Clerks & Secretaries. p. 7. Archived from the original (PDF) on September 8, 2015.

Legal offices
Preceded by Franklin S. Billings Jr.	Justice of the Vermont Supreme Court; 1983–1997	Succeeded by Marilyn Skoglund
Political offices
Preceded by John D. Paterson	Chairman of the Vermont Public Service Board; 1963–1972	Succeeded by William Gilbert
