= Thomas L. Hayes =

American judge

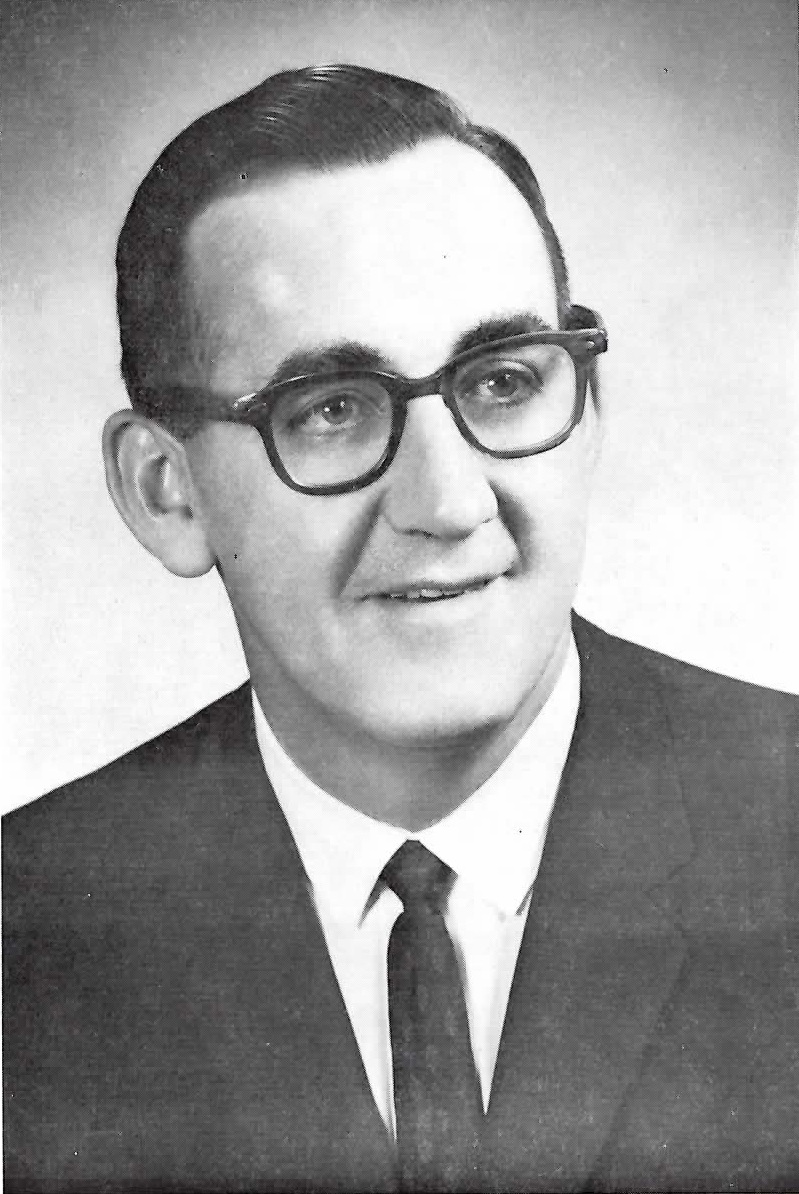
- Thomas L. Hayes, Vermont Lieutenant Governor and Supreme Court Justice

71st Lieutenant Governor of Vermont
- In office 1969–1971
- Governor: Deane C. Davis
- Preceded by: John J. Daley
- Succeeded by: John S. Burgess

Justice of the Vermont Supreme Court
- In office 1985–1987
- Preceded by: Wynn Underwood
- Succeeded by: Marilyn Skoglund

Personal details
- Born: May 30, 1926; Fair Haven, Vermont, US
- Died: May 5, 1987 (aged 60); Boston, Massachusetts, US
- Resting place: Saint Marys Cemetery, Fair Haven, Vermont
- Political party: Republican (before 1972); Democratic (after 1972)
- Spouse: Jennie Christy
- Children: 3
- Profession: Attorney; Politician; Judge

Thomas L. Hayes (May 30, 1926 – May 5, 1987) was the 71st lieutenant governor of Vermont and a Vermont Supreme Court Justice. He was appointed to the Supreme Court in 1985 by then-Governor Madeleine M. Kunin.

== Biography ==
Thomas Lawlor Hayes was born in Fair Haven, Vermont, on May 30, 1926. He was educated in Fair Haven, and graduated from Bellows Falls High School. Hayes served in the Army from 1944 to 1946 as an Infantry and Signal Noncommissioned officer in the Pacific Theater.

He graduated from the University of Vermont in 1950 and joined the staff of Winston Prouty, who served in the United States House of Representatives and as a United States senator. Hayes remained with Prouty for 15 years and advanced to the position of Administrative Assistant in his Washington office. He received a law degree from Georgetown University in 1955.

In 1966 Hayes, then residing in Middlebury ran unsuccessfully for governor, and lost the Republican nomination to Richard A. Snelling. He was the successful Republican nominee for lieutenant governor in 1968 and served one term, 1969 to 1971. Active in opposition to the Vietnam War, he made national headlines in 1970 when, as acting governor, he ordered Vermont flags lowered to half staff after the killing of four students at Kent State University by National Guard troops. In response Governor Deane Davis returned to Vermont from a conference and countermanded Hayes's directive.

Hayes ran unsuccessfully against Davis for governor in the 1970 Republican primary. He later became a Democrat and resided in Burlington. He served as Legal Counsel to Governor Thomas P. Salmon, was chairman of the Vermont State Board of Education, and was appointed a Judge of the Superior Court. While on the Superior Court, he served as chief administrative judge.

In 1985, Hayes was appointed a justice of the Vermont Supreme Court, succeeding Wynn Underwood; Hayes served in this position until his death. He was an advocate of attorneys paying greater attention to state constitutions generally, and the Vermont constitution in particular, and suggested that too much deference was paid to "buzzwords" from federal court decisions. In Vermont v. Jewett, Hayes argued that state constitutions should serve as consistent protection for the rights and liberties of a state's citizens, no matter how the decisions of the federal courts ebbed and flowed as membership and political outlook changed over time.

At the time of his death, he faced Judicial Conduct Board charges for alleged misconduct along with fellow justices William C. Hill and Ernest W. Gibson III. Hill retired, and Vermont Judicial Conduct Board charges against Gibson were dropped in August 1987. (Wheel was later convicted on charges arising from the case; Hill was found to have violated rules regarding judicial conduct.)

Hayes died in Boston, Massachusetts, on May 5, 1987, while being treated for lung cancer. He was buried at Saint Marys Cemetery in Fair Haven.

He was married to Jennie Christy. They had three children, two sons and a daughter.

== Sources ==
=== Magazines ===
- "Lawyers Admonished to Use State Constitutions". ABA Journal. Chicago, IL: American Bar Association. January 1, 1986. pp. 132–133.

=== Books ===
- Douglas, James H. (1985). Vermont Legislative Directory. Montpelier, VT: Vermont Secretary of State. p. 448.
- Hand, Samuel B. (2002). The Star That Set: The Vermont Republican Party, 1854-1974. Lanham, MD: Lexington Books. p. 280. ISBN 978-0-7391-0600-6.

=== Newspapers ===
- Hagerman, Bob (September 14, 1966). "Snelling Wins GOP Nod to Face Hoff in November". Bennington Banner. Bennington, VT. p. 1.
- "Republicans End Democrats' 6-Year Statehouse Control". Burlington Free Press. Burlington, VT. November 6, 1968. p. 1.
- "Montpelier Becomes New Goal, Hayes May Cancel Ceremony". Bennington Banner. Bennington, VT. May 8, 1970. p. 1.
- "Thomas L. Hayes, Beleaguered Justice of Vermont Court". New York Times. New York, NY. Associated Press. May 6, 1987.
- "High Court Drops Charges Against Gibson". Burlington Free Press. Burlington, VT. August 29, 1987. p. 21.
- Graff, Christopher (May 10, 1988). "Former Vermont Supreme Court Justice Found in Violation of Conduct Rules". Associated Press News.

=== Internet ===
- "Massachusetts Death Index, 1970-2003, Entry for Thomas L. Hayes". Ancestry.com. Provo, UT: Ancestry.com, LLC. May 5, 1987.

Party political offices
| Preceded by Perry H. Merrill | Republican nominee for Lieutenant Governor of Vermont; 1968 | Succeeded by John S. Burgess |
Political offices
| Preceded by John J. Daley | Lieutenant Governor of Vermont; 1969–1971 | Succeeded by John S. Burgess |
Legal offices
| Preceded by Wynn Underwood | Justice of the Vermont Supreme Court; 1985–1987 | Succeeded by Frank G. Mahady |
