= William C. Hill =

American judge (1917–1998)

- Born: William Charles Hill; May 10, 1917; Newark, New Jersey
- Died: May 28, 1998 (aged 81); Shelburne, Vermont
- Education: Irvington High School, New York University, New York University Law School
- Occupations: lawyer, judge and Army officer
- Parent(s): William Herbert Hill and Alice Anna (DeGroot) Hill

William Charles Hill (May 10, 1917 – May 28, 1998) was a Vermont attorney and judge. His most notable service came as an associate justice of the Vermont Supreme Court from 1976 to 1987.

== Early life ==
William Charles Hill was born in Newark, New Jersey on May 10, 1917, the son of William Herbert Hill and Alice Anna (DeGroot) Hill. He was raised and educated in Irvington, New Jersey, and graduated from Irvington High School. He received his Bachelor of Arts degree from New York University in 1939, and in 1941 he received his J.D. from New York University Law School. After admission to the bar, Hill practiced in New York City.

== Military service ==
Hill joined the United States Army for World War II. He enlisted in 1942, and received his commission as a second lieutenant after completing the Army Administration School's officer training program at North Dakota Agricultural College in Fargo. Hill served in the European Theater of Operations and at the 1st Service Command in Boston as a member of the U.S. Army Claims Service, the agency responsible for adjudicating and resolving incidents of damage or destruction to civilian property. He was a captain when he was discharged in 1946, and he remained in uniform as a member of the United States Army Reserve. Hill was a member of the Judge Advocate General's Corps, and attained the rank of lieutenant colonel before retiring.

== Early career ==
Hill moved to Vermont in 1946, and lived in Hinesburg and Shelburne while practicing law in Burlington. In the late 1940s and early 1950s, Hill acted as judge of the Burlington municipal court during the judge's absence. In 1950, he was an unsuccessful candidate for the Republican nomination to represent Hinesburg in the Vermont House of Representatives. Hill was elected in 1952, reelected in 1954 and 1956, and served from 1953 to 1959. In 1959, he was appointed a judge of the Vermont Superior Court. He served until 1976, and was the court's chief judge beginning in 1972. In 1968, Hill received a Master of Arts degree in history from the University of Vermont.

== Vermont Supreme Court ==
In 1976, Hill was appointed an associate justice of the Vermont Supreme Court, succeeding Milford K. Smith. He served until retiring in 1987, and was succeeded by John Dooley.

=== Controversy ===
During his Supreme Court tenure, Hill was involved in allegations of misconduct. In 1986 and 1987, Hill and two other justices, Ernest W. Gibson III and Thomas L. Hayes, were accused of tailoring decisions to suit the wishes of an assistant judge in Chittenden County, and helping her cover up pay padding; the assistant judge, Jane Wheel, was supposed to be wielding undue influence over the justices. Hayes died before the charges could be resolved, and charges against Gibson were dropped. Wheel was convicted on charges arising from the case. Hill was found to have violated rules regarding judicial conduct, and opted to retire at the end of his second six-year term, rather than applying to remain on the court until age 70, Vermont's mandatory retirement age for judges.

== Other activities ==
Hill was a visiting professor of history at Burlington's Trinity College, and a lecturer on trial advocacy at Franklin Pierce Law Center in Concord, New Hampshire.

An accomplished saxophone and clarinet player, Hill played in both the Shelburne Town Band and the Burlington Concert Band. He was also a beekeeper and a certified master gardener.

In 1992, Hill published The Vermont State Constitution: A Reference Guide, a work on the document's history and interpretation.

== Death and burial ==
Hill died at his home in Shelburne, Vermont from the effects of lung cancer on May 28, 1998. He was buried at Shelburne Village Cemetery in Shelburne.

== Family ==
In 1942, Hill married Grace Giarratano (1919-2008). She was a graduate of Hunter College and the University of Vermont, and taught in several Chittenden County school systems. They were the parents of daughters Toni, Pamela, and Elizabeth.

== Sources ==
=== Newspapers ===
- "W. C. Hill of N. Y. Has Joined Latham Law Offices Here". Burlington Free Press. Burlington, VT. June 15, 1946 – via Newspapers.com.
- "Chas. Willette Is Put On Probation". Burlington Free Press. Burlington, VT. May 16, 1950 – via Newspapers.com.
- "Nominations for Town Representative". Burlington Free Press. Burlington, VT. September 13, 1950 – via Newspapers.com.
- "William Hill and Rudolph Daley Are Elected State Superior Judges". Burlington Free Press. Burlington, VT. February 20, 1959 – via Newspapers.com.
- Carlson, Stephen (January 29, 1972). "Judge Daley Is New Supreme Court Justice". Burlington Free Press. Burlington, VT. Free Press Capitol Bureau – via Newspapers.com.
- "Judges Sworn In". Bennington Banner. Bennington, VT. United Press International. November 8, 1976 – via Newspapers.com.
- Brown, Leslie (July 16, 1986). "State Board Investigating Judge Wheel". Burlington Free Press. Burlington, VT – via Newspapers.com.
- "High Court Drops Charges Against Gibson". Burlington Free Press. Burlington, VT. August 29, 1987 – via Newspapers.com.
- Graff, Christopher (September 1, 1987). "Cloud Lifting from Supreme Court As Term Opens". Burlington Free Press. Burlington, VT. Associated Press – via Newspapers.com.
- Graff, Christopher (May 10, 1988). "Former Vermont Supreme Court Justice Found in Violation of Conduct Rules". Associated Press.
- Dennison, Meg (June 28, 1988). "Ex-Judge Wheel Gets Jail Term". Burlington Free Press. Burlington, VT. Associated Press – via Newspapers.com.
- "Obituary, William C. Hill". Burlington Free Press. Burlington, VT. May 30, 1998 – via Newspapers.com.
- "Obituary, Grace Giarratano Hill". Burlington Free Press. Burlington, VT. July 29, 2008 – via Newspapers.com.

=== Books ===
- Guest, James A. (1979). Vermont Legislative Directory (1979). Montpelier, VT: Vermont Secretary of State.
- Marquis Who's Who Staff (2000). Who Was Who In America. Chicago, IL: Marquis Who's Who. ISBN 9780837902326.
- Vermont House of Representatives (1974). Journal of the House of Representatives of the State of Vermont. Montpelier, VT: Vermont General Assembly.

=== Magazines ===
- "Death Notice, William C. Hill". The Vermont Bar Journal & Law Digest. Vol. 5, no. 24. Montpelier, VT: Vermont Bar Association. 1998. "He represented the Town of Hinesburg in the Vermont House of Representatives from 1953 to 1959."

Political offices
| Preceded by Milford K. Smith | Justice of the Vermont Supreme Court; 1976–1987 | Succeeded by John Dooley |
