= List of parishes in the Diocese of Burlington =

The Roman Catholic Diocese of Burlington covers the entire U.S. state of Vermont, divided over 10 deaneries.

== Addison Deanery ==
This deanery contains parishes in Middlebury and other communities in Vermont.

Name	Image	Location	Description/sources
Church of the Assumption of the Blessed Virgin Mary		326 College St, Middlebury	Founded in 1837, current church dedicated in 1912
Otter Valley Catholic Community		Our Lady of Good Help Church, 38 Carver St, Brandon	Founded in 1867. Now part of Otter Valley Catholic Community
		St. Alphonsus Church, 2918 US-7, Pittsford	Founded in 1892. Now part of Otter Valley Catholic Community
St. Ambrose & St. Peter Catholic Community		St. Ambrose Church, 11 School St, Bristol	Founded in the 1850s for Irish immigrants, current church dedicated in 1971. Now part of the Community
		St. Peter Church, 85 South Maple St, Vergennes	Founded in 1834 for French-Canadian immigrants, current church dedicated in 1890s. Now part of the Community
St. Bernadette		9 Crown Point Rd, Bridport	Founded in the 1930s for French-Canadian immigrants, current church dedicated in 1941

== Bennington Deanery ==
This deanery contains parishes in Southern Vermont.

Name	Image	Location	Description/sources
Christ Our Savior Parish		St. Paul Church, 398 Bonnet St, Manchester Center	
Our Lady of Fatima and St. Joachim Parishes		Our Lady of Fatima Church, 96 East Main St, Wilmington	Now merged with St. Joachim Parish
		St. Joachim Church, 342 Tunnel St, Readsboro	Founded in 1895 for Italian and French-Canadian immigrants. Now merged with Our Lady of Fatima Parish
Sacred Heart St. Francis de Sales Parish		Sacred Heart Church	Founded in 1854, merged with St. Francis de Sales in 1995
		St. Francis de Sales Church	Founded in 1880, merged with Sacred Heart in 1995
St. John the Baptist		3 Houghton St, North Bennington	Founded in 1885, current church dedicated in 1928
St. John Bosco		818 Main Rd, Stamford	Founded in 1963, current church dedicated in 1982

== Burlington Deanery ==
This deanery contains parishes in the City of Burlington.

Name	Image	Location	Description/sources
Cathedral of St. Joseph		29 Allen St, Burlington	Founded in 1850 as the first parish for French-Canadians in New England, current church dedicated in 1887, named as co-cathedral in 1999
Catholic Center at UVM		University of Vermont campus	
Christ the King-St. Anthony		305 Flynn Ave, Burlington	St. Anthony Church was dedicated in 1903, Christ the King Church in 1939. The two parishes were combined in 1998
St. Mark		1251 North Ave, Burlington	Founded in 1941, current church dedicated in 1942

== Capital Deanery ==
This deanery contains parishes in Central Vermont.

Name	Image	Location	Description/sources
St. Augustine		16 Barre St, Montpelier	Founded in 1850
St. John the Evangelist		206 Vine St, Northfield	Founded in 1866, current church dedicated in 1877
St. Monica		79 Summer St, Barre	Founded in 1892, church started in 1887
The Roman Catholic Communities of Waterbury, Waitsfield and Moretown		St. Patrick Church, 100 Route 100B, Moretown	Founded in 1857. Now part of the Communities
		St. Andrew Church, 109 S Main St, Waterbury Village Historic District	Founded in 1869 for Irish immigrants. Now part of the Communities
		Our Lady of the Snows Church, 6305 Main St, Waitsfield	Now part of the Communities

== Franklin Deanery ==
This deanery contains parishes in Franklin, Grand Isle and Lamoille Counties in Vermont

Name	Image	Location	Description/sources
All Saints Parish		All Saints Church, 152 Main St, Richford	Now part of All Saint Parish
		Our Lady of Lourdes Church, 2902 VT Route 105, East Berkshire	Church closed in 2017. Parish now part of All Saint Parish
		St. Isidore Church, 169 Mountain Rd, Montgomery Center	Founded in 1881, current church dedicated in 1893. Now part of All Saint Parish
Blessed Sacrament		728 Mountain Rd, Stowe	Current church dedicated in 1949
Nativity of the Blessed Virgin Mary - Saint Louis Parish		Nativity of the Blessed Virgin Mary Church, 65 Canada St, Swanton	Founded in 1854, current church dedicated in 1925. Now merged with St. Louis Parish
		St. Louis Church, 222 Lamkin St, Highgate	Founded as mission in the 1840s, became a parish in 1886, current church dedicated in 1974. Now merged with Nativity Parish
Our Lady of the Lake Parish		St. Joseph Church, 23 St. Joseph Lane, Isle La Motte	Founded in 1871,current church dedicated in 1966. Now part of Our Lady of the Lake Parish
		St. Joseph Church, 185 Rte 2, Grand Isle	Now part of Our Lady of the Lake Parish
		St. Amadeus Church, 75 N. Main St, Alburgh	Founded in 1886, now part of Our Lady of the Lake Parish
		St. Rose of Lima Church, 501 Route 2, South Hero	Founded in 1895, now part of Our Lady of the Lake Parish
St. Albans Catholic Community		Immaculate Conception Church, 45 Fairfield St, St Albans City.	Founded as St. Mary in 1847, now part of St. Albans Catholic Community
		Holy Angels Church, 246 Lake St, St. Albans City	Founded in 1872 for French-Canadian immigrants. Now part of St. Albans Catholic Community.
St. Ann		41 Main St, Milton	Founded in 1859, current church dedicated in 1985
St. John the Baptist, St. Anthony and St. Mary Parishes		St. John the Baptist Church, 62 Missisquoi St, Enosburg Falls	Founded in 1874 for French-Canadian immigrants. Now merged with St. Anthony and St. Mary
		St. Anthony Church,117 Shawville Rd, Sheldon Springs	Founded in 1907, current church dedicated in 1912. Now merged with St. Mary and St. John the Baptist.
		St. Mary Church, 145 Square Rd, Franklin	Now merged with St. Anthony and St. John the Baptist.
St. Luke and Ascension Parishes		St. Luke Church, 17 Huntville Rd, Fairfax	Founded as a mission in 1865, current church dedicated in the 1870s, became a parish in 1925. Now merged with Ascension Church.
		Ascension Church, 3157 Ethan Allen Hwy, Georgia	Founded as mission in 1968, current church dedicated in 1988. Now merged with St. Luke Church.
St. Patrick and St. Anthony-St. George Parish		St. Patrick Church, 116 Church Rd, Fairfield	Now merged with St. Anthony-St. George Parish
		St. Anthony - St. George Church, 9491 Route 36, East Fairfield	St. Anthony and St. George Parishes combined in 1924, church consecrated in 1940. Now merged with St. Patrick Parish
St. Thomas and St. Mary Churches		St. Thomas Church, 6 Green St, Underhill Center	Founded in 1872. Now merged with St. Mary Parish
		St. Mary Church, 312 N. Main St, Cambridge	Now merged with St. Thomas Parish
The Most Holy Name of Jesus		301 Brooklyn St, Morrisville	

== Northeast Kingdom Deanery ==
This deanery contains churches in the Northeast Kingdom region of Vermont.

Name	Image	Location	Description/sources
Corpus Christi Parish		St. John the Evangelist Church, 49 Winter St, St. Johnsbury	Founded in 1966 with the merger of Notre Dame des Victoires and St. Aloysius Parishes. Now part of Corpus Christi Parish
		Our Lady Queen of Peace, 240 U.S. Rt. 2 East, Danville	Founded in 1953, church started in 1957. Now part of Corpus Christi Parish
		St. Elizabeth Church, 610 Hill St, Lyndonville	Founded in 1891, now part of Corpus Christi Parish
Mary, Queen of Saints Parish		Our Lady of Fatima Church, 21 Creek Rd, Craftsbury	Founded as mission in 1950, current church dedicated in 1952, closed in 2023. Now part of Mary, Queen of Saints Parish
		St. Michael Church, 270 The Bend Rd, Greensboro Bend	Founded as mission in the 1890s, current church dedicated in 1967. Now part of Mary, Queen of Saints Parish
		St. Norbert Church, 193 S Main St, Hardwick	Founded as mission in 1897, current church dedicated in 1977. Now part of Mary, Queen of Saints Parish
Mater Dei Parish		St. Edward the Confessor Church, 250 Main St, Derby Line	Founded in the 1940s. current church dedicated in 1964. Now part of Mater Dei Parish
		St. James the Greater, 146 Walnut Ave, Island Pond	Founded in the 1850s, current church dedicated in 1899. Now part of Mater Dei Parish
		St. Mary Star of the Sea, 191 Clermont Ter, Newport	Founded in 1873, current church dedicated in 1909. Now part of Mater Dei Parish
Most Holy Trinity Parish		St. John Vianney Church, 85 Creek Rd, Irasburg	Founded in 1940, now part of Most Holy Trinity Parish
		St. Paul Church, 85 St. Paul Lane, Barton	Now part of Most Holy Trinity Parish
		St. Theresa of the Child Jesus Church, 44 East St, Orleans	Now part of Most Holy Trinity Parish
St. André Bessette Parish		Sacred Heart of Jesus Church, 130 S Pleasant St, North Troy	Founded in 1891, current church dedicated in 1996. Now part of St. André Bessette Parish
		St. Ignatius Church, 151 Hazen Notch Rd, Lowell	Now part of St. André Bessette Parish
		St. Vincent de Paul Church, 18 N. Pleasant St, North Troy	Now part of St. André Bessette Parish

== Rutland Deanery ==
This deanery contains parishes in Southern Vermont.

Name	Image	Location	Description/sources
Church of the Annunciation of the Blessed Virgin Mary		7 Depot St, Ludlow	Founded in 1870s, current church dedicated in 1876
		Holy Name of Mary Church, 832 Main St, Proctorsville	Current church dedicated in 1869. Supervised by Church of the Annunciation of the BVM.
Our Lady of the Mountains		4173 US-4, Killington	
Our Lady of the Seven Dolors		10 Washington St, Fair Haven	Founded in 1867 for French-Canadian immigrants
Rutland-Wallingford Catholic Community		Christ the King Church, 66 S Main St, Rutland	Now part of Rutland-Wallingford Catholic Community
		St. Patrick Church, 218 N Main St, Wallingford	Founded in 1866. Now part of Rutland-Wallingford Catholic Community
St. John the Baptist		45 N Rd, Castleton	Founded in 1874, current church dedicated in 1929
St. Paul		73 Church Rd, Orwell	Founded in 1860 and current church dedicated that same year
St. Peter		134 Convent Ave, Rutland	
St. Raphael		21 E Main St, Poultney	Founded in 1884, current church dedicated in 1902
West Rutland Catholic Community		St. Bridget Church, 28 Church St, West Rutland	Current church dedicated in 1861. Now part of West Rutland Catholic Community
		St. Dominic Church, 45 South St, Proctor	Founded in 1893, now part of West Rutland Catholic Community
		St. Stanislaus Kostka, 11 Barnes St, West Rutland	Founded in the early 1900s for Polish immigrants, current church dedicated in 1907. Now part of West Rutland Catholic Community

== South Burlington Deanery ==
This deanery contains churches in the southern part of Chittenden County in Vermont.

Name	Image	Location	Description/sources
Our Lady of Mount Carmel		2914 Spear St, Charlotte	Founded in the 1850s, current church dedicated in 1858. It is the second oldest Catholic church in continuous use in Vermont.
St. Catherine of Siena		72 Church St, Shelburne	Founded as mission in 1895, became a parish in 1906
St. John Vianney		160 Hinesburg Rd, South Burlington	Founded in 1940, current church dedicated the same year.
St. Jude		St. Jude, 10759 Rte 116, Hinesburg	Founded as mission in 1942, current church dedicated in 1990

== Windham–Windsor Deanery ==
Name	Image	Location	Description/sources
Holy Family Parish		Maternity of the Blessed Virgin Mary Church, 10 Pleasant St, Springfield	Founded in 1901, current church dedicated in 1930. Now part of Holy Family Parish
		St. Joseph the Worker, 96 S Main St, Chester	Founded in 1946, current church dedicated in 1969. Now part of Holy Family Parish
Our Lady of the Snows		7 South St, Woodstock	
Our Lady of the Valley Parish		Our Lady of the Angels Church, 43 Hebard Hill Rd, Randolph	Now part of Our Lady of the Valley Parish
		St. Anthony Church, 221 Church St, Bethel	Now part of Our Lady of the Valley Parish
St. Anthony		41 Church St, White River Junction	
St. Charles		31 Cherry Hill St, Bellows Falls	Founded in 1871
St. Michael		47 Walnut St, Brattleboro	Founded in 1855
Upper Valley Parishes		Our Lady of Light Church, 203 VT-132, South Strafford	Now part of Upper Valley Parishes
		Our Lady of Perpetual Help Church, 113 Upper Plain, Bradford	Now part of Upper Valley Parishes
		St. Eugene I Church, Center St, Wells River	Now part of Upper Valley Parishes
		St. Francis of Assisi Church 75 Beaver Meadow Rd, Norwich	Now part of Upper Valley Parishes

== Winooski Deanery ==
This deanery contains parishes in the eastern part of Chittenden County in Vermont

Name	Image	Location	Description/sources
Catholic Community of Colchester		Our Lady of Grace Church, 784 Main St, Colchester,	Now part of Catholic Community of Colchester
		Holy Cross Church, 416 Church Rd, Colchester	Now part of Catholic Community of Colchester
Essex Catholic Community		Holy Family/St. Lawrence Church, 30 Lincoln St, Essex Junction	Holy Family was founded in 1883, current church dedicated in 1893. Now part of Essex Catholic Community
		St. Pius X Church, 20 Jericho Rd, Essex Junction	Founded in 1957, current church dedicated in 1961, Now part of Essex Catholic Community
St. Francis Xavier		3 St Peter St, Winooski	Founded in 1868 for French-Canadian immigrants, current church dedicated in 1885
Two Vermont Catholic Parishes		Immaculate Heart of Mary Church, 7415 Williston Rd, Williston	Now part of Two Vermont Catholic Parishes
		Our Lady of the Holy Rosary Church, 64 W Main St, Richmond	Founded in 1865. Now part of Two Vermont Catholic Parishes
