= Catholic churches in Vermont =

This is a list of the Roman Catholic churches in the state of Vermont, along with the towns or cities in which they are located. Three Catholic Churches in Vermont closed in 2020, mainly due to the lack of sufficient priests to staff parishes.

Church	Image	Municipality
Saint Amadeus Church		Alburg
Saint Margaret Mary's Church		Arlington
Saint Monica's Church		Barre
Conversion of Saint Paul Church		Barton
Sacred Heart Church		Bellows Falls
Saint Charles' Church		Bellows Falls
Sacred Heart/Saint Francis de Sales' Church		Bennington
Saint Anthony's Church		Bethel
Our Lady of Perpetual Help Church		Bradford
Saint Mary's Church		Brandon
Saint Michael's Church		Brattleboro
Saint Bernadette's Church		Bridport
Catholic Center at the University of Vermont		Burlington
Christ the King Church		Burlington
Saint Anthony's Church		Burlington
Saint Joseph's Cathedral		Burlington
Saint Mark's Church		Burlington
Saint Mary's Church		Cambridge
Assumption of the Blessed Virgin Mary Church		Canaan
Saint John the Baptist Church		Castleton
Our Lady of Mount Carmel Church		Charlotte
Saint Joseph's Church		Chester
Saint Robert's Church		Chittenden
Holy Cross Church		Colchester
Our Lady of Grace Church		Colchester
Saint Michael's College Chapel		Colchester
Our Lady of Fatima Church		Craftsbury
Holy Trinity Church		Danby
Queen of Peace Church		Danville
Saint Edward's Church		Derby Line
Saint Cecelia/Saint Francis Cabrini Church		East Barre
Our Lady of Lourdes Church		East Berkshire
Saint Jerome's Church		East Dorset
Saint Anthony's Church		East Fairfield
Saint Gabriel's Church		Eden
Saint John the Baptist Church		Enosburg Falls
Saint Pius X's Church		Essex Center
Holy Family Church		Essex Junction
Saint Lawrence's Church		Essex Junction
Saint Luke's Church		Fairfax
Saint Patrick's Church		Fairfield
Our Lady of Seven Dolors Church		Fair Haven
Saint Norbert's Church		Hardwick
Saint Elizabeth Church		Lyndonville
Saint Mary's Church		Middlebury
Saint Anne Church		Middletown Springs
Saint Augustine Church		Montpelier
Saint Patrick Church		Moretown
Our Lady, Star of the Sea Church		Newport
Saint John the Baptist Church		North Bennington
Our Lady of Mercy Church		Putney
Our Lady of the Angels Church		Randolph
All Saints Church		Richford
Saint Peter's Church		Rutland
Christ the King Church		Rutland
Saint John the Evangelist Church		St. Johnsbury
Saint John Vianney Church		South Burlington
Saint Thomas Church		Underhill
Saint Peter's Church		Vergennes
Saint Eugene I Church		Wells River
Saint Bridget's Church		West Rutland
Saint Stanislaus' Church		West Rutland
Saint Anthony's Church		White River Junction
Saint Francis Xavier Church		Winooski
Our Lady of the Snows Church		Woodstock

== See also ==
- List of Catholic churches in the United States
