= John Joseph McDermott =

American catholic bishop

His Excellency, The Most Reverend John Joseph McDermott
- Bishop of Burlington
- Diocese: Burlington
- Appointed: May 6, 2024
- Installed: July 15, 2024
- Predecessor: Christopher J. Coyne

Orders
- Ordination: June 3, 1989 by John Aloysius Marshall
- Consecration: July 15, 2024 by Seán Patrick O'Malley, Christopher J. Coyne and Salvatore Ronald Matano

Personal details
- Born: March 19, 1963 (age 63) Red Bank, New Jersey, US
- Education: United States Coast Guard Academy; Belmont Abbey College; Mount St. Mary's Seminary; Catholic University of America
- Motto: God alone suffices

Styles of John Joseph McDermott
- Reference style: His Excellency; The Most Reverend
- Spoken style: Your Excellency
- Religious style: Bishop

John Joseph McDermott (born March 19, 1963) is an American Catholic prelate who has served as Bishop of Burlington since 2024. He previously served as the diocesan administrator.

== Biography ==
=== Early life ===
John McDermott was born on March 19, 1963, in Red Bank, New Jersey, the seventh of ten children of Robert and Jacqueline (Sullivan) McDermott. At the age of two, his family moved to Hudson, Massachusetts, where he attended St. Michael's parochial school, He then went to Hudson Catholic High School until the family relocated to Central Valley, New York. McDermott graduated from Monroe-Woodbury High School in Central Valley.

After a year at the United States Coast Guard Academy in New London, Connecticut, McDermott decided to become a priest. He switched to Belmont Abbey College in Belmont, North Carolina, where he graduated with a double major in political science and philosophy.

=== Priesthood ===
McDermott was ordained to the priesthood for the Diocese of Burlington on June 3, 1989 at the Cathedral of the Immaculate Conception in Burlington by Bishop John Aloysius Marshall.

McDermott holds a master's degree in divinity and theology from Mount St. Mary's Seminary in Emmitsburg, Maryland and a degree in canon law from the Catholic University of America in Washington, D.C.. He served as the Catholic chaplain to Middlebury College in Middlebury, Vermont, from 1996 to 2001.

McDermott served as director of the Catholic Center at the University of Vermont in Burlington from 2021 to 2024.In January 2014, McDermott was voted to serve as administrator for the diocese. This role ended in January 2015.

=== Episcopal career ===
Pope Francis appointed McDermott as bishop of Burlington on May 6, 2024. On July 15, 2024, McDermott was consecrated as bishop at the Cathedral of Saint Joseph in Burlington by Cardinal Sean O'Malley.

== See also ==
- Catholic Church in the United States
- Historical list of the Catholic bishops of the United States
- List of Catholic bishops of the United States
- Lists of patriarchs, archbishops, and bishops

== Episcopal succession ==
Catholic Church titles
Preceded by Christopher J. Coyne	Bishop of Burlington; 2024–present	Succeeded by Incumbent
