= Saint Monica's Church, Barre =

Church building in Barre, Vermont, USA

Coordinates: 44.20145°N 72.50419°W

Saint Monica's Church is a Roman Catholic parish in the city of Barre, Vermont. It is in the Diocese of Burlington. The congregation dates from the original settlement of Barre in the 19th century, and its present building dates from the late 1880s.

== History ==
The church in Barre began life as a mission from the church of Saint Augustine in the older settlement of Montpelier, Vermont.

The original Roman Catholic settlers of Barre had been traveling to worship at Montpelier. However, in 1881 the Catholic population had grown to the point that the priest from Montpelier was traveling to Barre to conduct worship for 31 families, initially in the town hall. By 1886, the priest had leased a disused academy building to accommodate the Barre Mission. The group then set-out to construct new purpose-built church.

The church was finished on October 2, 1887, at a cost of $25,000 for the lot and construction of the church and rectory. The church was built to accommodate the growing number of Roman Catholic families, especially of Irish, Italian, and French descent, who were flocking to Barre to work in the granite industry. The dedication to St Monica, related to the fact that the original Montpelier Church was dedicated to Monica's son, Saint Augustine. Since its founding, Saint Monica's has undergone several major renovations.

In 1927, in response to a demand for faith-based education for local Roman Catholic children, the priest of St. Monica's founded a school adjacent to the church.

=== The Carrara connection ===
Barre is a granite mining town with a tradition of sculpturing. It is linked with Carrara in Italy, which has a much longer but similar tradition with marble sculpture.

According to the University of Vermont, in 1905, the Roman Catholic Granite workers of Barre, many of whom were Italian immigrants, took the unusual step of importing marble from Carrara to complete their church altar. Indeed, many of Barre's granite sculptors had immigrated from Carrara itself in 1883, bringing their needed skills to the town.

At the time, the altar cost $2,000 to build. In 1968, much of the marble work was stripped away, but an effort is being made to restore the church to its former glory.

== Today ==
Today, the working parish currently employs seven staff, two of whom are ordained priests. It was described by Mother Jones as "the biggest Catholic church in the state." Due to declining membership, Bishop Christopher J. Coyne combined St. Monica with St. Sylvester's Parish in Graniteville and St. Cecelia & St. Frances Cabrini in East Barre.

The school is still in operation as a K-8 school on its original site, next to the church. It is now known as St. Monica-St. Michael School and has a faculty and staff of 23.

The cemetery adjacent to the church dates from 1895, however it was given over to the city in 1970.
