= Cathedral of the Immaculate Conception (Burlington, Vermont) =

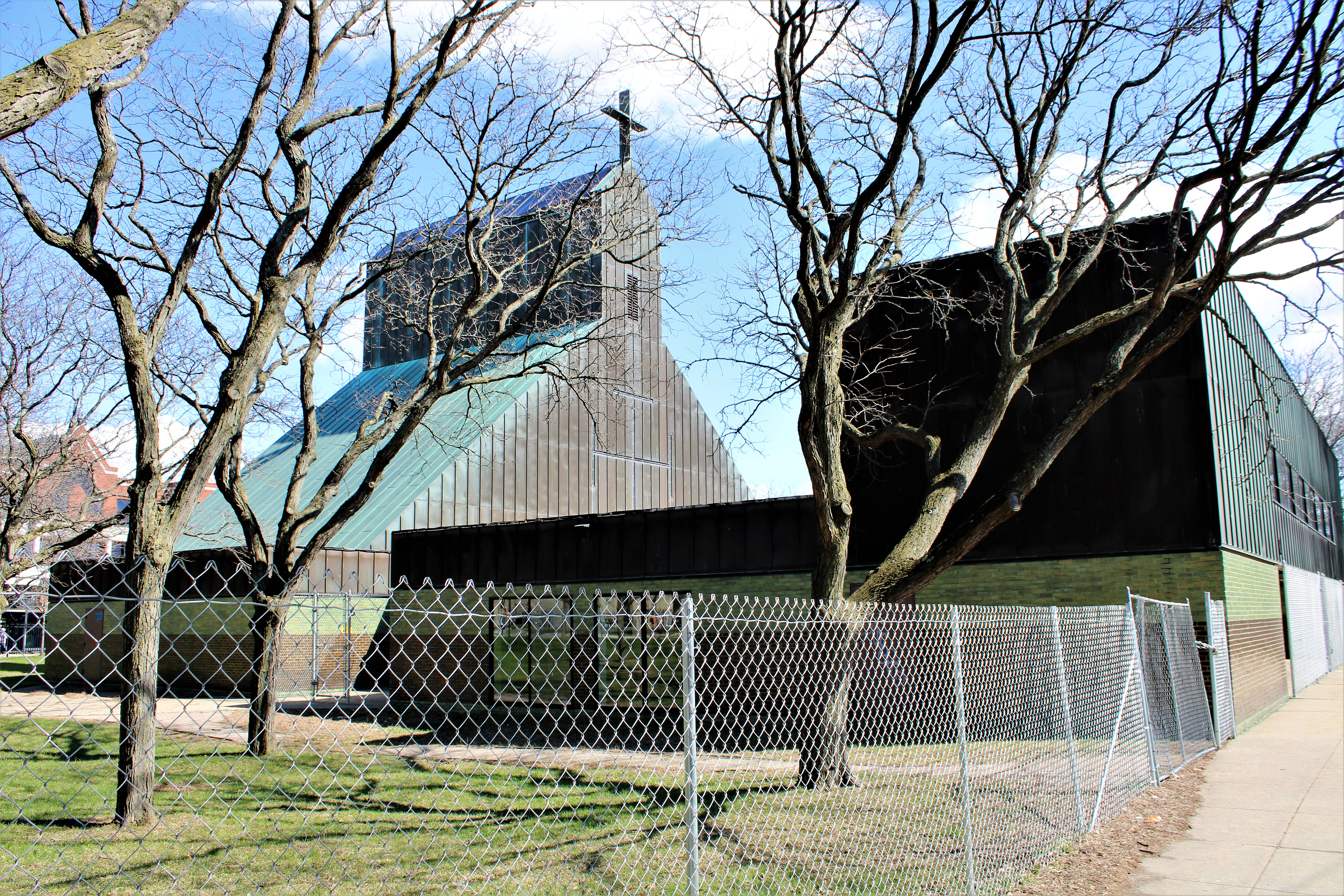
- The former cathedral in 2022
- Cathedral of the Immaculate Conception
- 44°28′47.05″N 73°12′53.56″W
- Location: 20 Pine Street; Burlington, Vermont
- Country: United States
- Denomination: Catholic Church

History
- Status: Desacralized
- Founded: 1830
- Dedication: Immaculate Conception
- Dedicated: May 26, 1977

Architecture
- Architect(s): Edward Larrabee Barnes Alistair Bevington (associate architect); Toshiko Mori (interiors and furnishings) Dan Kiley (landscape architect)
- Style: Modern
- Completed: 1977
- Closed: December 2018

Specifications
- Capacity: 450
- Materials: Brick, Standing Seam Copper

Administration
- Diocese: Burlington

The Cathedral of the Immaculate Conception in Burlington, Vermont, United States, was the former cathedral church of the Catholic Diocese of Burlington. The building was located at 20 Pine Street with grounds bounded by Pearl, St. Paul and Cherry Streets. In 2018, it was announced that the building would no longer serve as a Catholic church. After sitting vacant, and listed for sale, the diocese sought and received a permit for its demolition, which was carried out between June and September 2025.

== History ==
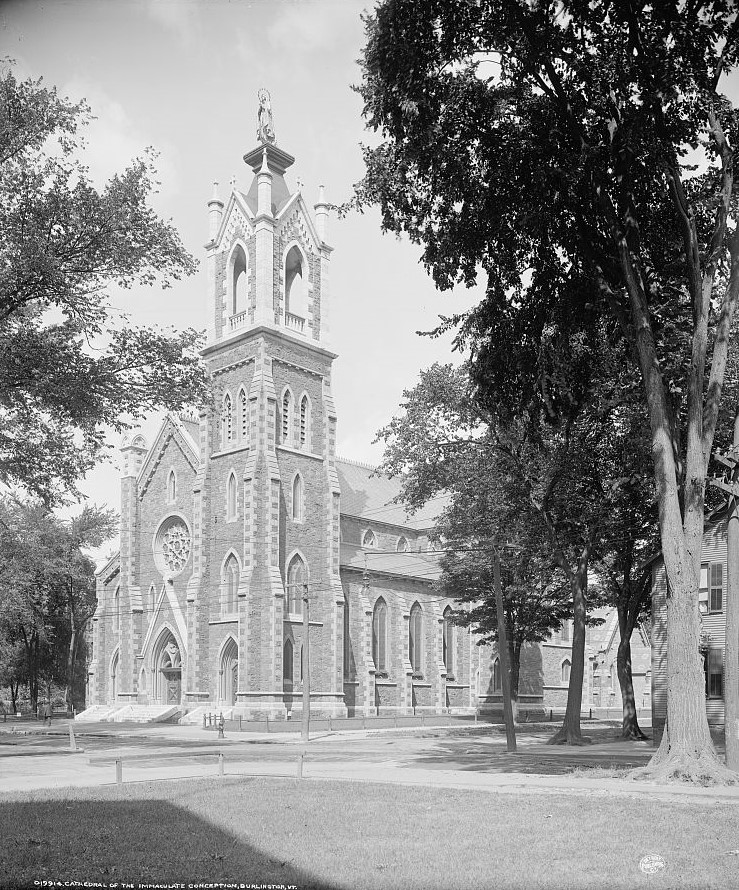
The original cathedral

The parish was founded as St. Mary's in 1830. The parish church that was built in 1841 became the pro-cathedral when the diocese was established in 1852.

=== 1867 cathedral ===
Construction of the first Immaculate Conception Cathedral began in 1862 and continued until 1867. Progress was slowed because of the American Civil War. The Chapel of St. Patrick, which was located behind the cathedral, was completed first. The Gothic Revival cathedral built of locally quarried redstone was designed by prominent Brooklyn, New York architect Patrick Keely. Other local materials used in its construction were marble and slate from around Rutland and limestone from the Isle La Motte. It was the first Catholic church building in New England that was designed, built, and dedicated as a cathedral.

The church was consecrated on December 8, 1867, by Bishop Louis de Goesbriand without a completed tower. It was finished in 1904 under the direction of Bishop John Michaud who also commissioned the statue of Notre Dame de Lourdes that was placed on top of its blunted spire. The statue was composed of vulcanized copper covered with gold leaf and stood 14 feet (4.3 m) tall. The altar in the cathedral had to be reset in 1936 after vibrations from traffic on the surrounding streets caused it to sink. A major interior renovation was undertaken in 1949 in preparation for the diocesan centennial.

This church served as the diocesan cathedral until it was destroyed by arson on March 13, 1972. While firefighters tried to contain the blaze, the bell tower collapsed shortly after midnight. Timothy Austin confessed to the police that he set the fire. He later pleaded innocent by reason of insanity and was sent for treatment at the state hospital.

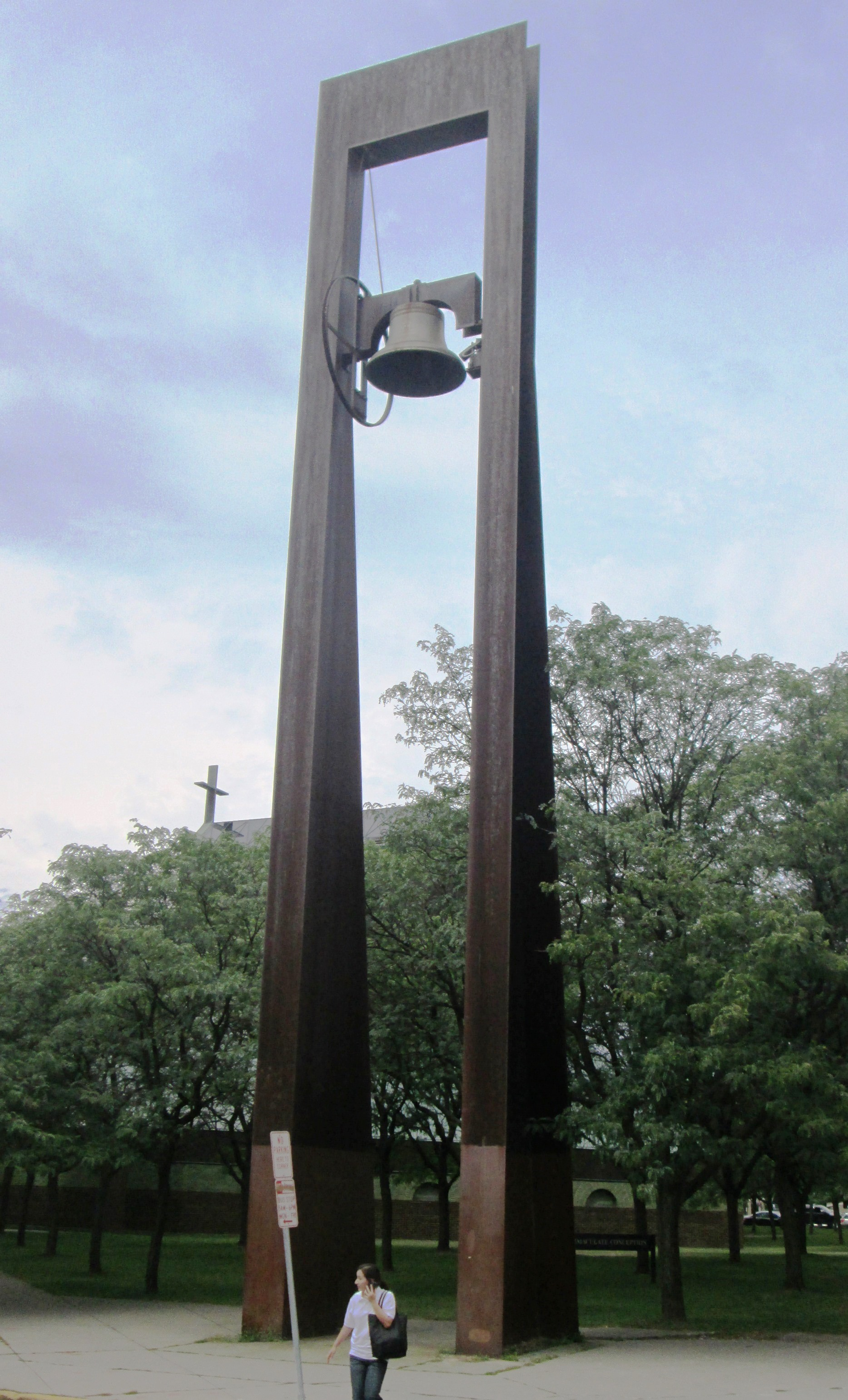
Bell tower

=== 1977 cathedral ===
In 1974, New York City architect Edward Larrabee Barnes was chosen to design a new cathedral on the same property. The project architect was then associate Alistair Bevington. Barnes and Bevington used as inspiration the Billings Memorial Library at the University of Vermont, designed by Henry Hobson Richardson. The modern five-sided sanctuary was composed of low brick walls in bands of green and dark brown covered by a high standing seam copper roof, clerestory, and facade. A large cross capped the gabled roof of the clerestory. Because of a decline in the Catholic population, the seating capacity was set at 450. A rectangular-shaped structure of one and two-stories was connected to the front of the sanctuary by a wide hyphen. It contained a gathering space on the main floor and it was capped with a flat roof. The "Great Cross" stained glass window in the west wall of the sanctuary was designed by glass artist Robert Sowers, and the ten semi-circular windows in the apse were designed by glass artist David Wilson. The interiors and furnishings were designed by architect Toshiko Mori, who worked in the Barnes office at the time. The tabernacle was designed by Bevington and the marble baptismal font, by Mary Barnes.

Vermont landscape architect Dan Kiley was commissioned to plan the park-like setting. He and Barnes collaborated on the entire project. Kiley positioned the building in the center of the block facing Pine Street. The property was planted with 123 uniformly spaced locust trees. They were placed within a grid pattern created by the straight concrete walkways that formed geometric lawn panels that mirrored the sharp angular form of the cathedral. The trees visually shielded the cathedral from its urban setting and created a sense of calm at the busy intersection. A juxtaposition was also created between the building's green and brown brick walls and copper roof with the light green leaves and dark brown trunks of the trees. A free-standing steel bell tower near the corner of Cherry and St. Paul Streets is where the old cathedral was located. The 4,500-pound (2,000 kg) bell was rescued from the ruins of the destroyed cathedral. It had been acquired by the parish in 1900 after its original bell, from the 1841 church, cracked the previous year. The entire building and landscaping project was completed in March 1977 and dedicated on May 26 of the same year by Bishop John Marshall.

The pipe organ located behind the altar was built by Casavant Frères of Saint-Hyacinthe, Quebec in 1980. It featured two manuals, three divisions, 16 stops, 16 registers, 20 ranks, and 1,000 pipes. Its manual compass was 56 notes and its pedal compass was 32 notes. The organ had an attached key desk. It was first used during a recital by Jane Bergeron on August 27, 1980.

=== Parish decline and closure ===
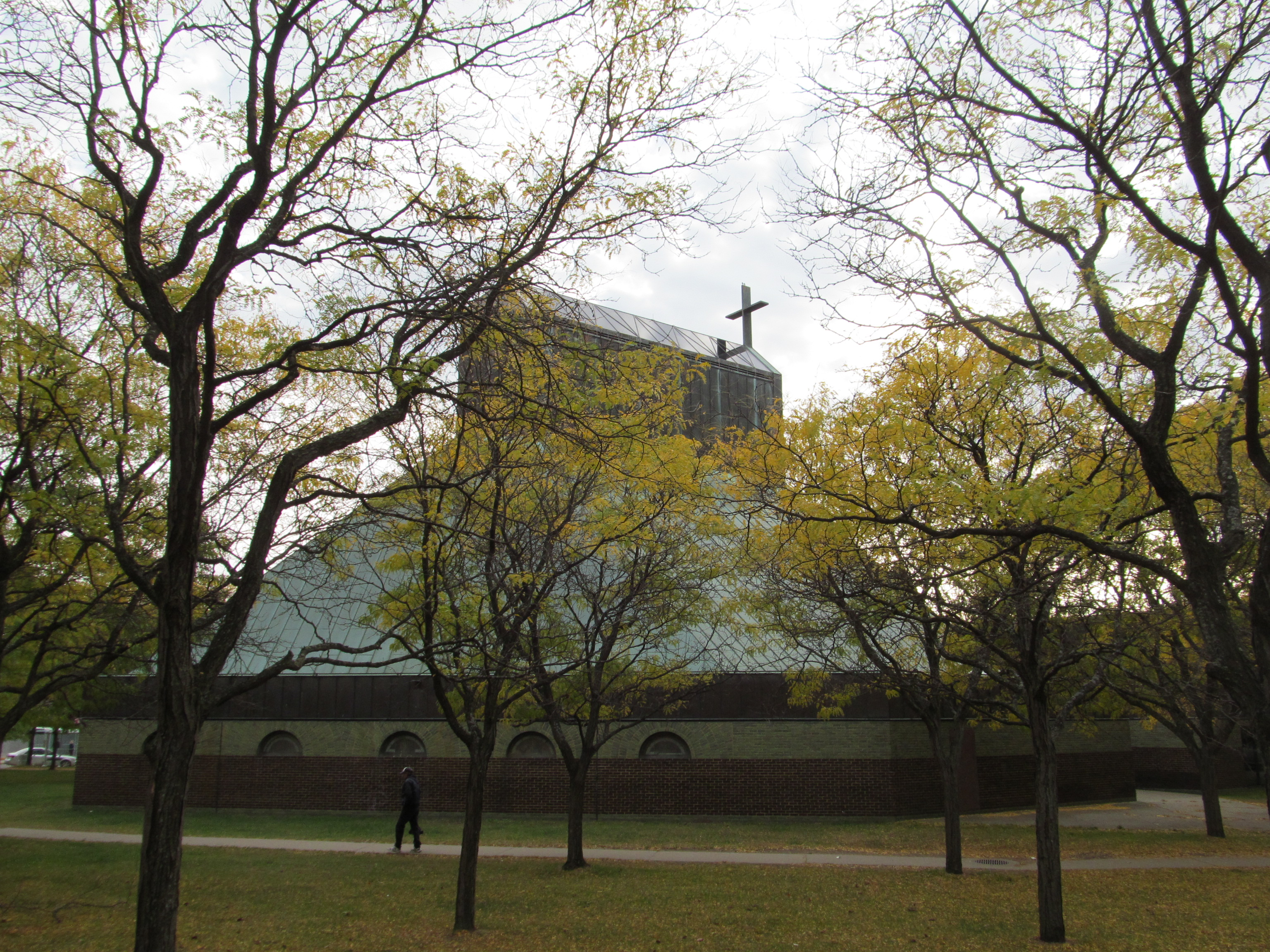
The cathedral in its landscaped setting.

Urban renewal affected the parish as the neighborhoods that once surrounded and supported it were removed. In 1999, Saint Joseph Church in Burlington was named the co-cathedral for the diocese. Because of low attendance and finances, the process for merging the two Burlington Catholic cathedrals began in 2017. The number of parishioners at Immaculate Conception had declined to fewer than 100. Sunday Masses were celebrated at St. Joseph, while Immaculate Conception had a weekday Mass at Noon and a monthly Mass in Vietnamese. Parishioners could have requested to have their baptisms, weddings, and funerals held there as well. The title to the Immaculate Conception property transferred to St. Joseph Parish. In April 2018 Immaculate Conception lost its cathedral status, and later in the year Bishop Christopher Coyne issued a decree relegating the building to secular use. On October 11, 2018, the Diocese of Burlington announced that it would sell the property. The last Mass was celebrated in the church on December 8, 2018.

The diocese applied for a permit to demolish the church building in December 2021. The permit was issued in early 2023. A group of 10 area residents appealed the decision in order save the building from demolition because the property is the result of the collaboration of Barnes and Kiley, "two of the foremost designers of the 20th century." They lost their appeal to the environmental division of Vermont Superior Court on February 6, 2024. They also lost an appeal to the Vermont Supreme Court on December 6, 2024. The Cathedral of the Immaculate Parish Charitable Trust, which owns the building, is under contract to sell the property. Work to demolish the building began on June 2, 2025. The demolition was completed in September of the same year.

== See also ==
- List of Catholic cathedrals in the United States
- List of cathedrals in the United States
