= Diocese of Burlington =

Latin Catholic ecclesiastical jurisdiction in Vermont, United States

Diocese of Burlington Dioecesis Burlingtonensis

Catholic
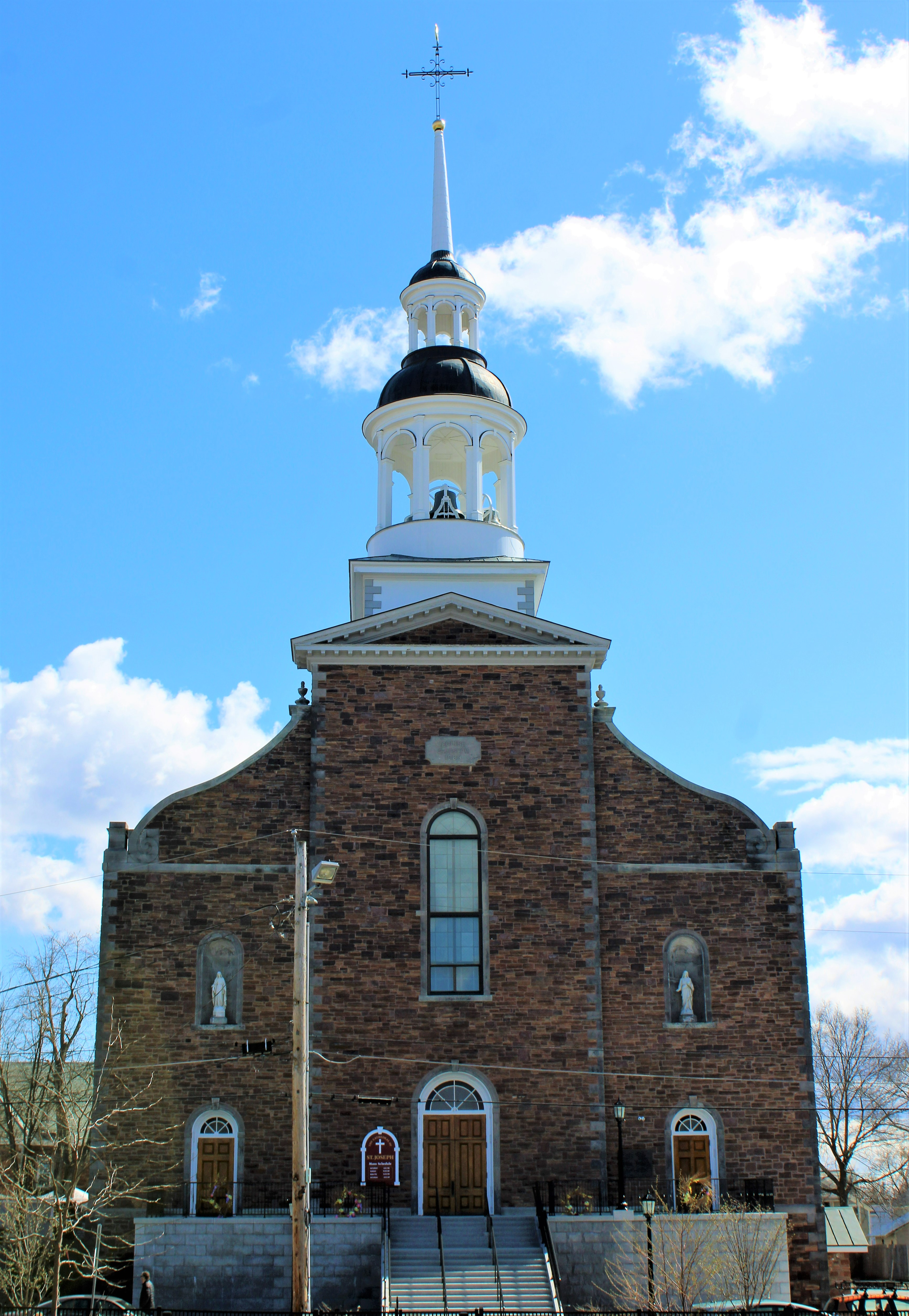
- Cathedral of Saint Joseph

- Coat of arms

Location
- Country: United States
- Territory: Vermont
- Ecclesiastical province: Boston
- Metropolitan: Boston
- Coordinates: 44°28′47″N 73°12′53″W

Statistics
- Area: 9,135 sq mi (23,660 km^{2})
- Population: Total; Catholics: (as of 2015); 661,000; 125,500 (19%)
- Parishes: 74

Information
- Denomination: Catholic
- Sui iuris church: Latin Church
- Rite: Roman Rite
- Established: July 29, 1853 by Pope Pius IX
- Cathedral: Cathedral of Saint Joseph
- Patron saint: Immaculate Conception; Saint Joseph
- Secular priests: 135

Current leadership
- Pope: Leo XIV
- Bishop: John Joseph McDermott
- Metropolitan Archbishop: Richard Henning

Map
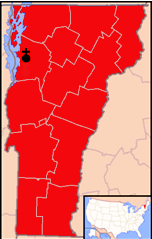

Website
- www.vermontcatholic.org

The Diocese of Burlington (Latin: Dioecesis Burlingtonensis) is a diocese of the Catholic Church for Vermont in the United States, erected in 1853. It is a suffragan diocese of the metropolitan Archdiocese of Boston. The mother church of the diocese is the Cathedral of Saint Joseph in Burlington.

== History ==
=== 1600 to 1800 ===
The first mass said in present-day Vermont was celebrated in 1666 by a Sulpician priest from Montreal, in the chapel of Fort Sainte Anne on Isle La Motte. The northern region of Vermont was largely settled in the 18th century by Catholic French Canadians who migrated south from the British Province of Quebec. In 1784, after the conclusion of the American Revolution, Pope Pius VI moved to remove American Catholics from the jurisdiction of the Diocese of London. He erected the Prefecture Apostolic of the United States, which included what was then the Vermont Republic. In 1789, the Vatican placed Vermont, along with the rest of the United States, under the jurisdiction of the Diocese of Baltimore.During the late 18th century, out of convenience, the bishops of Quebec continued to minister to Catholic settlers and Native Americans, mainly in northern Vermont

=== 1800 to 1850 ===
In 1801, Bishop John Carroll of Baltimore formally accepted the offer of Bishop Pierre Denaut of the Diocese of Quebec to care for French-speaking Catholics in Vermont. Pope Pius VII erected the Diocese of Boston in 1808, transferring Vermont to the new American diocese.

In the early 19th century, there were no Catholic priests residing in Vermont. Francis Matignon of Boston visited Burlington in 1815 and counted about 100 Catholic Canadians living there. Around 1818, Marie Migneault from Chambly, Quebec, came to Northern VermontVermont and ministered to the settlers by Lake Champlain for several years. Bishop Jean-Louis de Cheverus, the first Bishop of Boston, later appointed Migneault as vicar-general of that part of the diocese. Migneault continued as vicar general until 1853.

Joseph Fenwick succeeded Cheverus as bishop of Boston in December 1825. He visited Windsor, Vermont, in 1826. In 1827 he ordained James Fitton to the priesthood. Fitton served some time with the Passamaquoddy people before Fenwick sent him to serve the scattered Catholics in Vermont and New Hampshire. Fitton visited Burlington in 1829.

In 1830, Fenwick sent Jeremiah O'Callaghan to Vermont to serve as its first resident priest. He visited successively Wallingford, Pittsford, and Vergennes, then settled in Burlington. O'Callaghan had St. Mary's church built. It served as his mission base. His territory extended from Rutland, Vermont in the south to the Canadian border in the north, a distance of about 100 miles (160 km) and from Lake Champlain in the west to the Connecticut River in the east. St. Mary's Church in Burlington was destroyed by arson in May 1838. O'Callaghan served in Vermont for 23 years and was known as the "Apostle of Vermont."

In 1837, John Daley was sent by the Diocese of Boston to southern Vermont. He is described as an "eccentric, but very learned man". He usually made his headquarters at Rutland or Middlebury, Vermont, but spent most of his time traveling the state as a missionary. Daley went wherever Catholics lived without any particular schedule. Daley ministered in Vermont until 1854 and died in New York in 1870. An 1843 census showed the Catholic population of Vermont to be 4,940.

With the failure of the potato crop in Ireland due to potato blight in 1846, thousands of people left that country for the United States. Many of these Catholic immigrants ended up in Burlington. The construction of railroads in Vermont in 1848 brought many Irish and French-Canadian immigrants to Rutland. By 1853, the Catholic population in Vermont had reached 20,000.

=== 1850 to 1880 ===
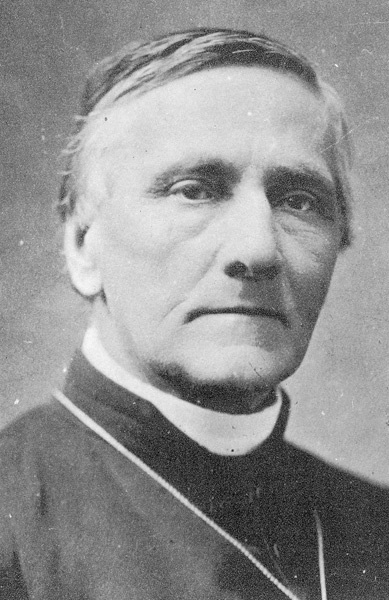
Bishop de Goesbriand (pre-1900)

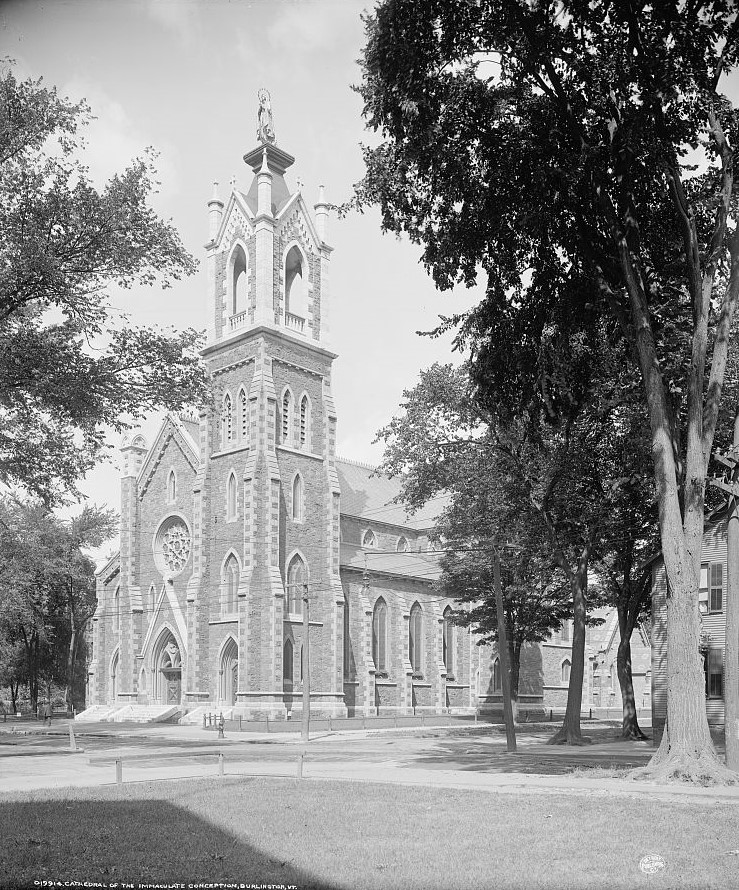
First Cathedral of the Immaculate Conception, Burlington, Vermont (1900 to 1907)

In 1850, Pope Pius IX elevated the Diocese of New York to a metropolitan archdiocese, assigning the Diocese of Boston, with its Vermont parishes, as a suffragan see.

In 1852, the bishops of the Ecclesiastical Province of New York were meeting in New York City. They decided that Vermont should have its own diocese. They made this proposal to the Vatican, with Burlington to be the episcopal see. Bishop John Fitzpatrick of Boston recommended Louis de Goesbriand, vicar-general of the Diocese of Cleveland, as the first bishop of Burlington.

On July 29, 1853, Pope Pius IX erected the Diocese of Burlington, taking Vermont from the Diocese of Boston. He designated the new diocese as a suffragan of the Archdiocese of New York, and appointed De Goesbriand as bishop.

In 1853, De Goesbriand arrived at Burlington. He was installed there the following day by Fitzpatrick. After his installation, De Goesbriand visited the entire diocese. He found about 20,000 Catholics scattered throughout Vermont. In 1855, he visited France and Ireland to recruit more priests for the diocese, bringing back several volunteers.

The first diocesan synod was held at Burlington in 1855. De Goesbriand appointed Thomas Lynch as vicar-general of the diocese in 1858. De Goesbriand started construction of the gothic Cathedral of the Immaculate Conception in 1861. Progress was slowed because of the American Civil War of the early 1860s. The contractors used marble quarried from Rutland and limestone from the Isle La Motte. De Goesbriand consecrated the Cathedral of the Immaculate Conception in 1867.

On February 12, 1875, Pius IX elevated the Diocese of Boston to a metropolitan archdiocese and transferred the Diocese of Burlington from the Archdiocese of New York to the new archdiocese.

In the 1870s, De Goesbriand bought a 25 acres (10 ha) parcel of land on North Avenue in Burlington from a former editor of the Burlington Free Press. In 1879, under the supervision of future Bishop John Michaud, the diocese constructed the St. Joseph orphanage there.

=== 1880 to 1900 ===
By 1881, De Goesbriand had a dozen priests to serve 6,000 congregants scattered throughout Vermont. In 1891, the diocese had the highest ratio of French speaking priests to francophone parishioners (1:1610) in New England.

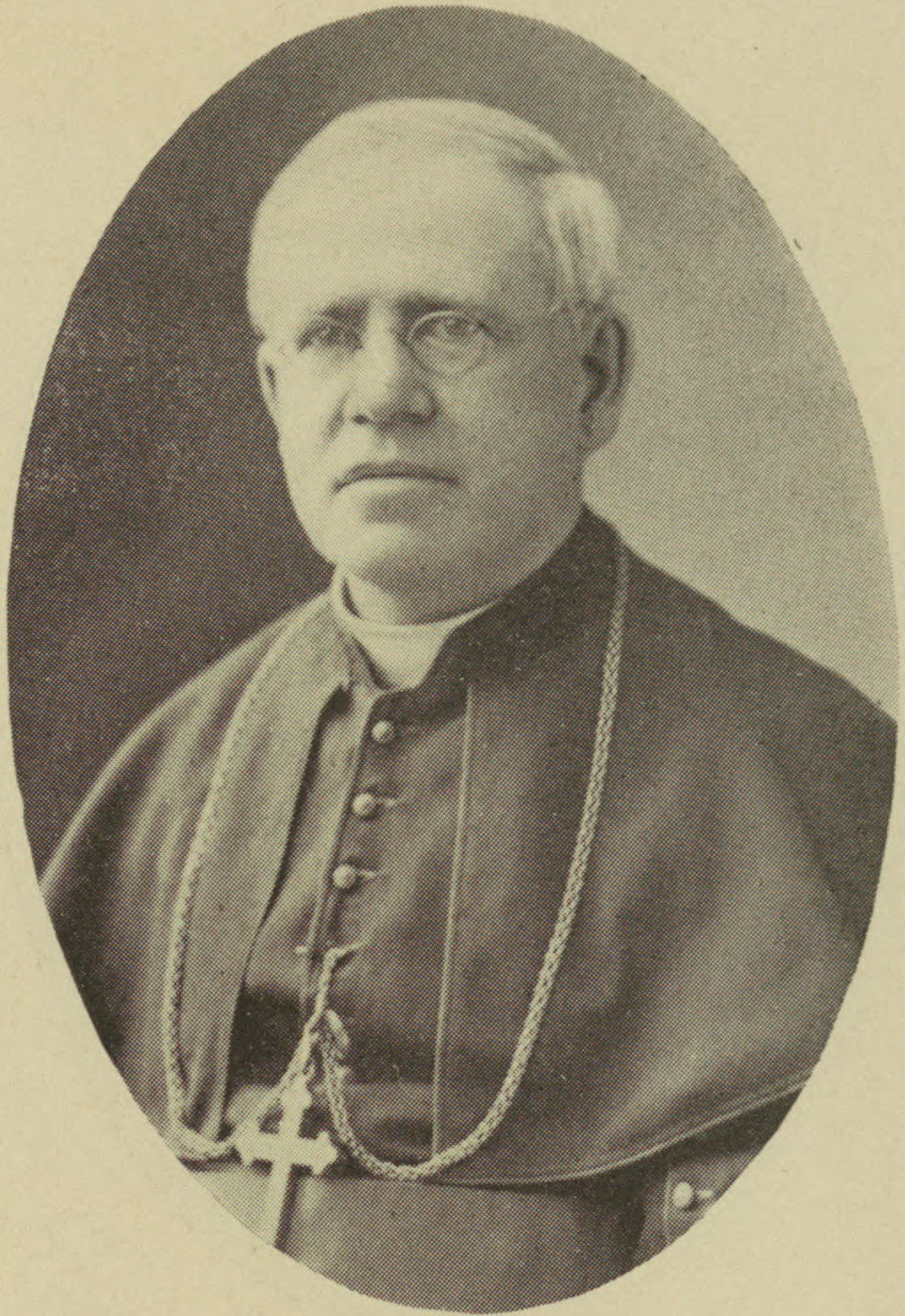
Bishop Michaud (1903)

In 1892, De Goesbriand purchased land at Fort Sainte Anne on Isle La Motte in order to preserve its history. A small chapel was built. That same year, due to his age and failing health, he requested the appointment of a coadjutor bishop by the Vatican to assist him. Pope Leo XIII appointed Michaud, then pastor of a parish of Bennington, Vermont, to this post.Handing many of his responsibilities to Michaud, De Goesbriand retired to St. Joseph's orphanage.In August 1894, De Goesbriand consecrated the Diocese of Burlington to Saint Peter.

The Religious Hospitallers of Saint Joseph came from Montreal to Burlington in 1894 to open the Fanny Allen Hospital, Hotel Dieu in Burlington. Today it is the Fanny Allen Campus of the University of Vermont Medical Center. The Sisters of Charity from Providence, Rhode Island, operated St. Johnsbury Hospital in St. Johnsbury, opening in 1895.That same year, the Sisters of Mercy opened Mount St. Mary Academy in Burlington, a high school for girls.

When De Goesbriand died in 1899, Michaud automatically succeed him as bishop of Burlington. De Goesbriand spent his entire family fortune constructing churches and orphanages in the diocese and assisting the poor; he died with only four dollars left to his name.

=== 1900 to 1950 ===
In 1904, Michaud invited the male Society of Saint Edmund to establish Saint Michael's College at Winooski Park. In 1905, the Daughters of Charity of the Sacred Heart of Jesus came to Newport to open a mission, where they served as teachers, nurses and catechists. The Loretto Home for the Aged in Rutland, served by the Sisters of St. Joseph, opened in 1905. During his tenure, Michaud increased the number of churches in Vermont from 72 to 94. The diocese at that time had 75,000 Catholics, 102 priests, 286 religious sisters, and 20 parochial schools serving about 7,000 students.

Michaud died in 1908. In 1910, Pope Pius X appointed Joseph Rice of the Diocese of Springfield in Massachusetts as the new bishop of Burlington. Rice placed De Goesbriand Memorial Hospital in Burlington under the care of the Religious Hospitallers of St. Joseph, and opened three high schools. The Sisters of Mercy in 1925 opened Trinity College on the Mount St. Mary Academy campus. In November 1925, during a period of anti-Catholic agitation throughout the United States, the Ku Klux Klan burned a cross on the steps of St. Augustine's Church at Montpelier, Vermont.

After Rice's death in 1938, Pope Pius XI appointed Matthew Brady from the Diocese of Hartford as his replacement. Brady erected 12 new parishes in Fairfax, Gilman, North Troy, Orleans, and South Burlington, all in Vermont. When Brady was appointed bishop of the Diocese of Manchester by Pope Pius XII in 1944, the next bishop was Edward Ryan from Boston. In 1945, Ryan purchased a 7 acres (2.8 ha) parcel adjacent to St. Joseph's Orphanage and created the Don Bosco School for Delinquent Boys.

=== 1950 to 2000 ===
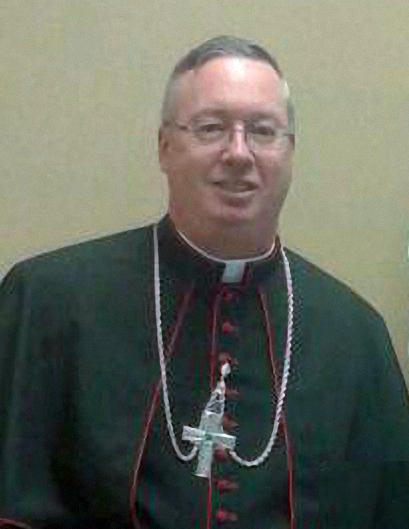
Bishop Coyne (2012)

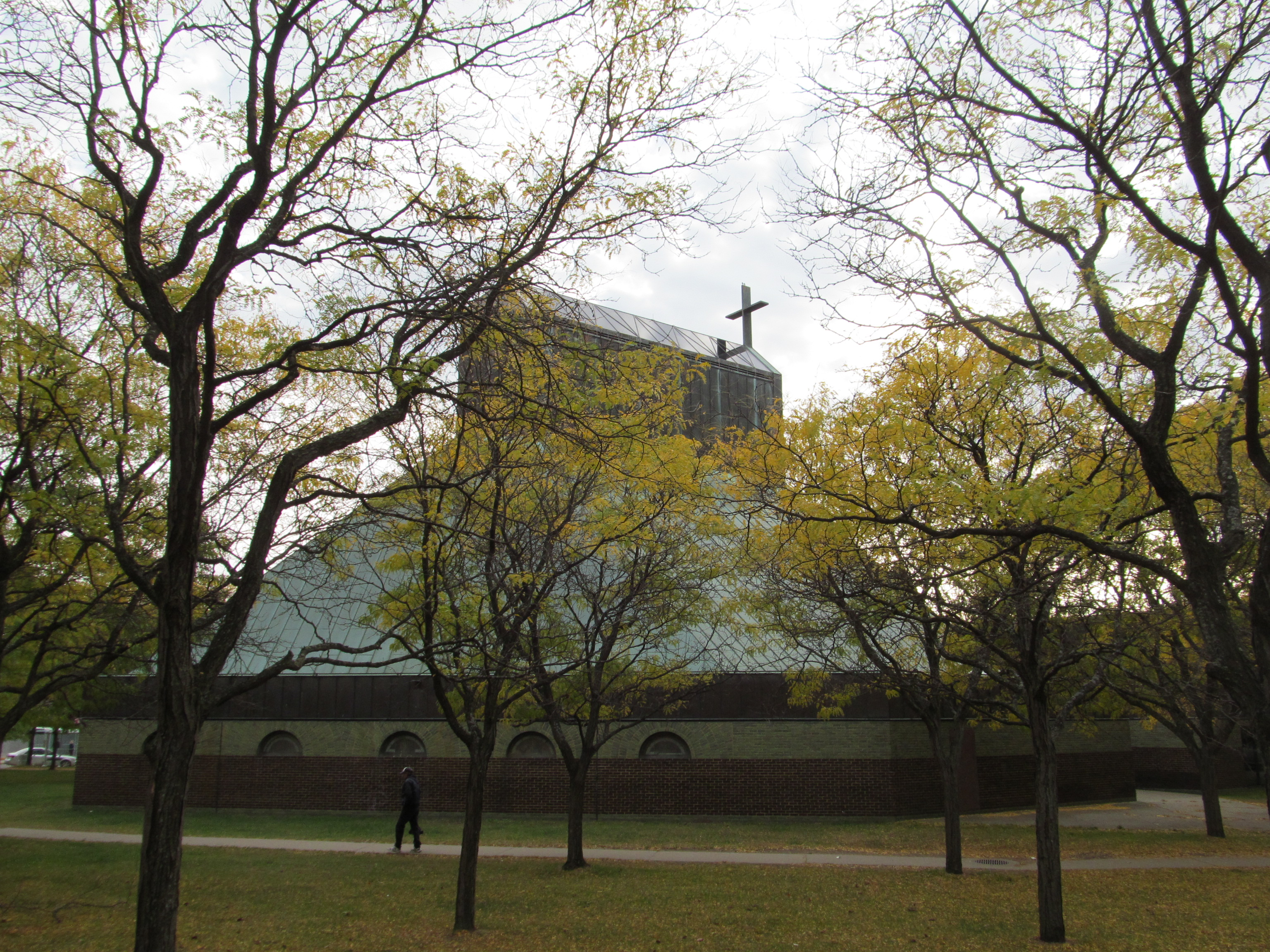
Second Cathedral of the Immaculate Conception (2012)

In 1954, Pius XII appointed Robert Joyce of Burlington as the first auxiliary bishop of that diocese. When Ryan died in 1956, Pius XII named Joyce as his replacement. With Joyce's retirement in 1971, Pope Paul VI appointed John Marshall from the Diocese of Springfield in Massachusetts as the next bishop.

In 1972, an arsonist burned the Cathedral of the Immaculate Conception. Marshall oversaw construction of a new cathedral with the same name on the same site in 1977. In 1974, Marshall closed St. Joseph's Orphanage and later sold the property. Today a condominium project known as 'Liberty House.' In 1981, the Immaculate Heart of Mary Monastery in Westfield was elevated by the Benedictine Order to the Immaculate Heart of Mary Abbey .

In 1992, Pope John Paul II appointed Auxiliary Bishop Kenneth Angell from the Diocese of Providence as the new bishop of Burlington. Under Angell, Catholic schools in the diocese experienced a 24% drop in enrollment between 1998 and 2008, from 3,190 to 2,431 students. Faced with a shortage of priests in the diocese and a decline in weekly mass attendance, Angell consolidated Sacred Heart and St. Francis de Sales Parishes in Bennington as well as St. Cecilia and St. Frances Cabrini in East Barre. He closed Our Lady of the Lake Parish in St. Albans. In the 1990s, the diocese was sued by former residents of St. Joseph's Orphanage, claiming abuse by the staff. Over 100 former residents stated that they had been physically, sexually and emotionally abused by nuns, priests and lay staff workers from the 1940s through the 1970s. The diocese ultimately paid over $300,000 to settle the claims of 60 former residents. Vermont Attorney General T.J. Donovan released an investigative report on St. Joseph's Orphanage in December 2020, finding evidence of physical and sexual abuse of the residents.

In 1994, the diocese was sued by Michael Gay, who claimed to have been molested by the priest Edward Paquette during the 1970s. The diocese settled Gay's lawsuit for $965,000 in 2006, then settled two more lawsuits for $8.75 million and $3.6 million. Paquette was laicized in April 2009. In February 2010, the diocese announced that it would sell its headquarters in Burlington and Camp Holy Cross in Colchester to pay sexual abuse victims. In May 2010, the diocese settled 26 lawsuits by former altar servers for sexual abuse by its clergy for $17.65 million. The diocese in 2013 settled 11 more sexual abuse cases for an undisclosed account. Nine of those cases were filed by victims of Paquette.

In 1999, the Vatican elevated Saint Joseph Church in Burlington as the co-cathedral of the diocese. Burlington became one of only four American dioceses to have two active cathedrals in the same city.

=== 2000 to present ===
In 2005, John Paul II appointed Salvatore Matano from Providence as coadjutor bishop of the diocese. When Angell retired several months later, Matano succeeded him.

In 2014, Pope Francis appointed Auxiliary Bishop Christopher J. Coyne from the Archdiocese of Indianapolis as the next diocesan bishop. He replaced Matano, who was appointed bishop of the Diocese of Rochester. Coyne's installation was celebrated on January 29, 2015, at the Co-Cathedral of Saint Joseph. In 2018, Coyne announced that the diocese was selling the Cathedral of the Immaculate Conception due to a long period of low attendance. Its members were transferred to St. Joseph's, which became the sole cathedral in the diocese.

In June 2023, Francis appointed Coyne as coadjutor archbishop of Hartford. John McDermott of Burlington was named bishop of the diocese by Francis on May 6, 2024. McDermott was Coyne's vicar general, and with the former's move to Hartford, served as Burlington's diocesan administrator. The diocese in August 2019 released the names of 40 clergy since 1950 who had been "credibly accused" of sex abuse. Most of these men were deceased and none were in active ministry. Much of the abuse occurred at St. Joseph's, and all but one incident took place before 2000. On September 30, 2024, the diocese filed for Chapter 11 bankruptcy, citing increased sex abuse lawsuits. As of 2024, the diocese faced over 61 lawsuits. In December 2025, it received permission from bankruptcy court to sell the former Loretto Home facility in Rutland for $1 million to a non-profit agency.

== Deaneries ==
Number of Catholics in diocese
Year	Pop.	±% p.a.
1815	100	—
1843	4,940	+14.95%
1853	25,000	+17.60%
1881	6,000	−4.97%
1899	75,000	+15.06%
1980	157,000	+0.92%
2005	149,000	−0.21%
2010	118,000	−4.56%

As of 2026, the Diocese of Burlington had a Catholic population of approximately 110,000, with 36 active priests, 44 permanent deacons and 15 religious ministering in 68 parishes. The parishes are divided into 12 deaneries.

== Bishops ==
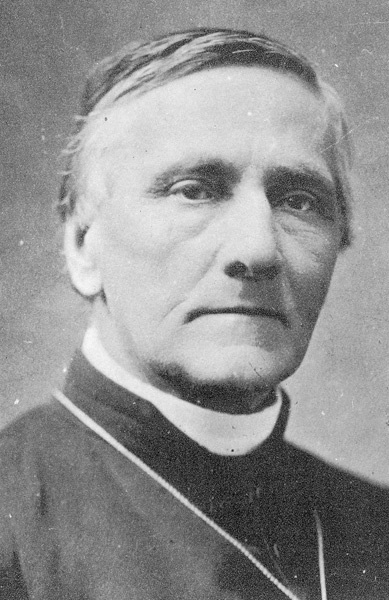
Bishop de Goesbriand (pre-1899)

=== Bishops of Burlington ===
1. Louis de Goesbriand (1853–1899)
2. John Stephen Michaud (1899–1908; coadjutor bishop 1892-1899)
3. Joseph John Rice (1910–1938)
4. Matthew Francis Brady (1938–1945), appointed Bishop of Manchester
5. Edward Francis Ryan (1945–1956)
6. Robert Francis Joyce (1956–1972)
7. John Aloysius Marshall (1972–1992), appointed Bishop of Springfield in Massachusetts
8. Kenneth Anthony Angell (1992–2005)
9. Salvatore Ronald Matano (2005–2014; coadjutor bishop 2005), appointed Bishop of Rochester
10. Christopher J. Coyne (2015–2023), appointed coadjutor Archbishop of Hartford
11. John Joseph McDermott (2024–present)

=== Auxiliary bishop ===
- Robert Francis Joyce (1954–1956), appointed Bishop of Burlington

=== Other diocesan priests who became bishops ===
- Bernard Flanagan, appointed Bishop of Norwich in 1953
- Louis Gelineau, appointed Bishop of Providence in 1971

== Education ==
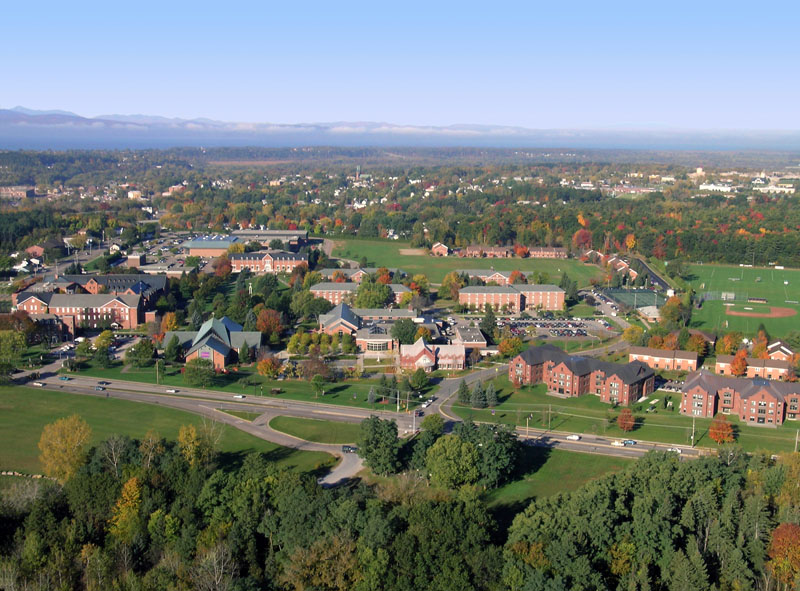
Saint Michael's College, Colchester, Vermont (2004)

As of 2026, the Diocese of Burlington included 12 Catholic schools with an enrollment (including catechetical students) of approximately 2,500. Student enrollment dropped 24% from 3,190 to 2,431 from 1999 to 2008. Dave Young is the superintendent of schools.

=== High schools ===
- Mount Saint Joseph Academy – Rutland
- Rice Memorial High School – South Burlington
- Saint Michael School – Brattleboro

== Notables ==
- In 1808 Fanny Allen, daughter of Revolutionary War General Ethan Allen, converted to Catholicism and entered the novitiate of Hôtel-Dieu de Montréal, where she was received as a member of the order.
- Orestes Brownson, the Catholic author and philosopher, was born in Stockbridge in 1803.
