= St. Peter's Church and Mount St. Joseph Convent Complex =

Historic church in Vermont, United States

- U.S. National Register of Historic Places
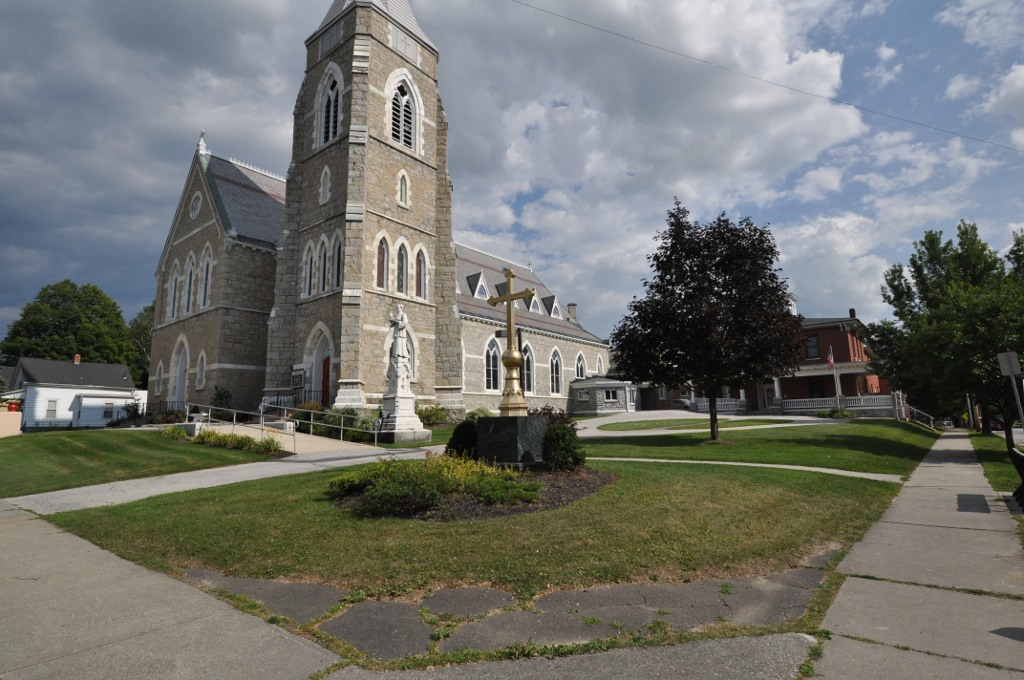

- Location within Vermont Location within the United States
- Location: Convent Ave., Meadow and River Sts. Rutland, Vermont
- Coordinates: 43°36′8″N 72°59′10″W
- Area: 6 acres (2.4 ha)
- Built: 1872
- Architect: Patrick C. Keely
- Architectural style: Italianate, Gothic Revival
- NRHP reference No.: 80000388
- Added to NRHP: October 3, 1980

St. Peter's Church and Mount St. Joseph Convent Complex is a Roman Catholic religious and educational complex on Convent and Meadow Streets in Rutland, Vermont. The complex includes a church, rectory, two schools, a convent, and an elderly housing building. It was listed on the National Register of Historic Places in 1980. The church is an architecturally significant work of architect Patrick C. Keely.

== Description and history ==
Built largely through the efforts of Italian American stoneworkers from 1869 to 1873 from stone quarried from the site of the church, St. Peter's is the largest and oldest (the "mother parish") of three Roman Catholic parish churches in the city of Rutland. The church was designed by the noted 19th-century ecclesiastical architect Patrick Charles Keeley of Brooklyn, New York, and is noted for its rugged exterior walls, lofty interior, and excellent stained glass. The church is 150 feet in length, 71 feet wide, and can seat over 880 people. Major renovations have taken place in 1950 under the direction of Rev. Robert Joyce, 1973 under the direction of Msgr. Thomas Connor, and 2000–2004 under the direction of Rev. W. Andre Houle. Buried under a large monument next to the church tower is Fr. Charles Boylan, the priest responsible for the construction of the church, and the former Sisters of Saint Joseph Convent directly across Convent Avenue. St. Peter's Parish is closely associated with Mount St. Joseph Academy, as well as the St. Joseph Home and the Loretto Home. It is within the Roman Catholic Diocese of Burlington. St. Peter Parish is currently administered by priests from the Capuchin Franciscan Province of Saint Mary.

== See also ==
- National Register of Historic Places listings in Rutland County, Vermont
