= Saint Augustine Church, Montpelier =

Historic church in Vermont, United States

Saint Augustine Church
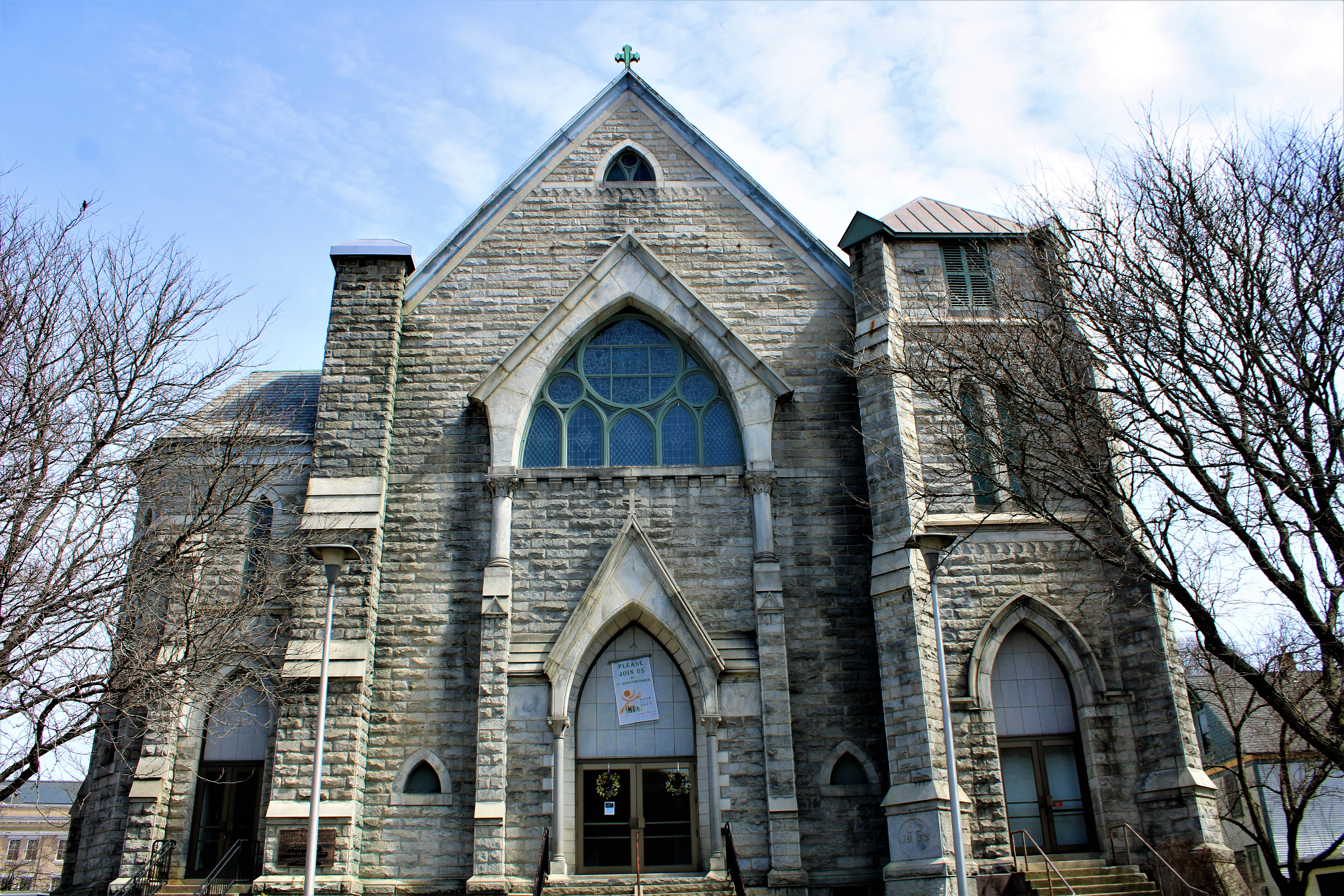

- Location within Vermont
- 44°15′29.7″N 72°34′31.7″W
- Location: Montpelier
- Country: United States
- Denomination: Roman Catholic Church
- Website: Official website of St. Augustine Parish

Architecture
- Architectural type: Gothic Revival
- Completed: 1903

Administration
- Deanery: Capital Deanery
- Parish: St. Augustine's Catholic Church

Clergy
- Bishop: John McDermott
- Dean: Fr. Pat Forman
- Pastor(s): Fr. Pat Forman and Fr. Luan Tran
- St. Augustine's Catholic Church
- U.S. Historic district – Contributing property
- Part of: Montpelier Historic District (Vermont) (ID78000246)
- Added to NRHP: November 3, 1978

Saint Augustine Church is a Roman Catholic church dedicated to Saint Augustine and located on Barre Street in Montpelier, Vermont.

== History ==
=== Beginning ===
The first Catholic mass in Montpelier was celebrated by the "Apostle of Vermont", Father Jeremiah O'Callaghan in the autumn of 1830. The first members of the parish were French Canadians.

Mass was celebrated at parishioners houses' for the first two decades. In 1850, the old courthouse was purchased, and mass was celebrated there for nine years.

=== Court Street Church ===
In 1850, a Québecois priest, the Reverend Hector Drolet, moved to Montpelier to become the first resident Catholic priest in the city. He also needed to find a site for a permanent Roman Catholic church in the city. Drolet purchased a small former brick courthouse on Court Street, located about 300 yards east of the Vermont State House. The old courthouse had been replaced by the new Washington County Court House on State Street.

The Vermont General Assembly in its 1850 session agreed to sell additional land to the north of the court building so the parish could construct a vestry. The former courthouse was renovated and used as a church until 1859. Drolet left Montpelier in 1854 to return to Québec. He was replaced by Father Maloney and Father Coopman.

In 1856 Father Druon arrived, becoming pastor, and built a larger church immediately east of the former court house. The new brick church with a double steeple opened in 1859 and was able to accommodate 900, serving as the parish church until the current one was erected. The small church in the former court house was converted to a rectory.

=== Current church ===
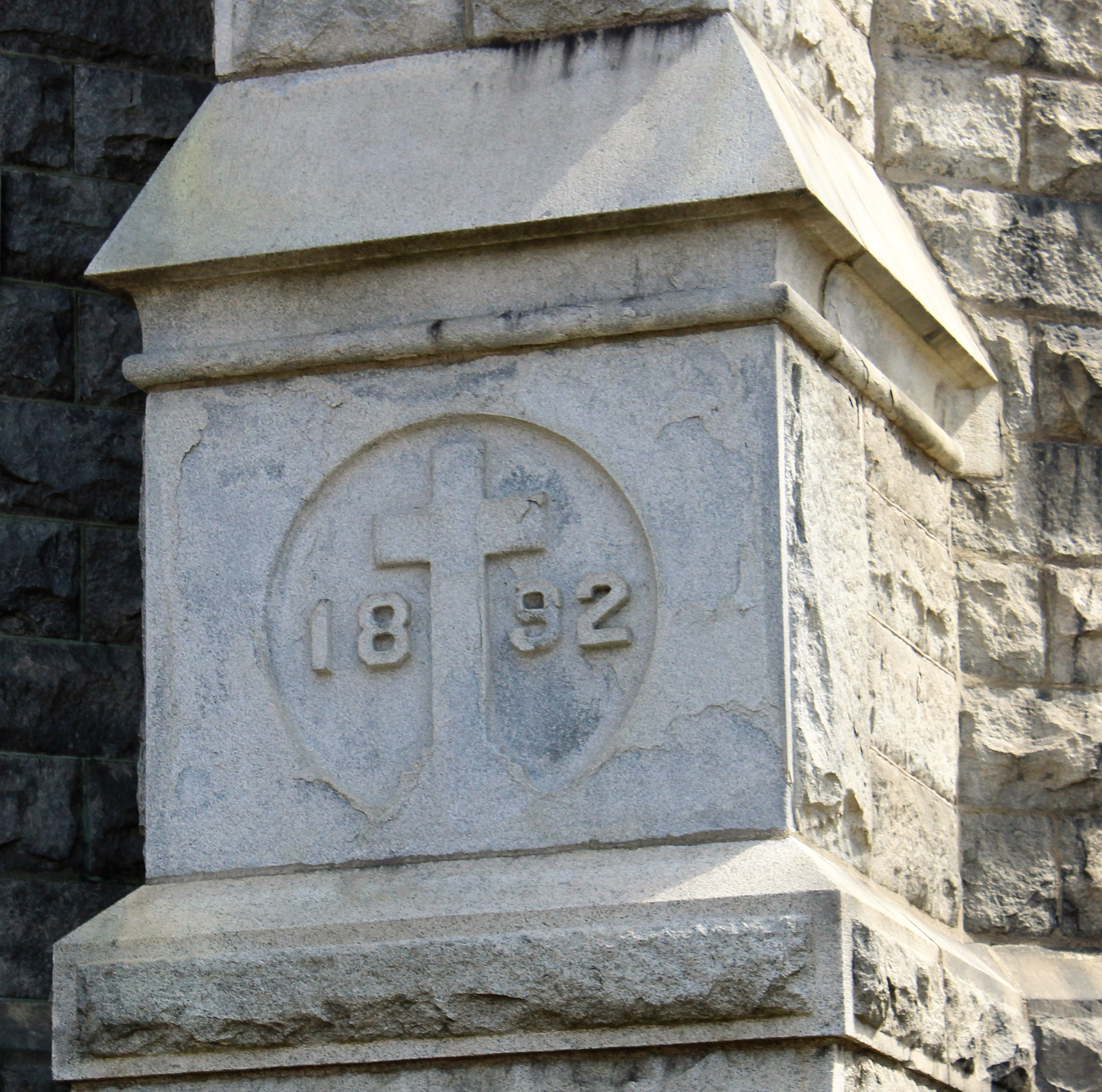
Cornerstone

The cornerstone for the present church building was laid on July 4, 1892, and the first mass was celebrated at Easter in the new church in 1903. The new St. Augustine church was built in the Gothic Revival style of rusticated gray Vermont granite, with a slate roof, and a detached circular vestry in the northeast corner. The original interiors were rich in finish, with elongated neogothic columns, lancet arches, polychrome stenciling on walls and ceilings in warm gray, madder rose, olive green and gold; stained glass, and paintings by Vermont artist Thomas Waterman Wood. A large central altar was flanked by two smaller side altars and the podium was located midway in the nave. The local newspaper at the time, the Montpelier Daily Journal, said of the newly constructed place of worship, "They have built a sanctuary that will be a joy and an inspiration not only to them, but to their children and their children's children for generations to come." The south facade has three entries; above the center entrance is a large rose window with a lancet pediment. Two towers flank the central entrance. The taller tower, on the eastern side, was not completed as designed. Instead of having a spire and parapet, it was capped with a low hip roof.

From 1968–69 a renovation of interior space, partly intended to respond to Vatican II changes in liturgy, removed the three original altars, chandeliers, and ornate mid-nave pulpit. The neogothic columns were encased in a contemporary form of white drywall; the ornamental wall stencilling and walls were painted over in white; and the floors were covered in turquoise blue synthetic carpeting. Most of the church's sculpture was removed. The polychrome cast-plaster stations of the cross were repainted in a monochrome gray color scheme, possibly intended to effect the look of stone.

== Mission to Barre ==
For main article, please see Saint Monica's Church, Barre

The first mass in Barre was held at the old town hall in 1881 by a priest from Saint Augustine's. In 1887, Saint Monica's Church was built, so the mission to Barre begot a church which eventually outgrew Saint Augustine's. Saint Monica was the mother of Saint Augustine.

== School ==
The parish of Saint Augustine's is also host to Saint Michael's Elementary School, which is now the Montpelier campus of the Central Vermont Catholic School, a result of the merger between Saint Monica's School and Saint Michael's.

== Cemetery ==
Saint Augustine's owns a cemetery located on Lincoln Avenue in Montpelier which is one of three in the city.

== Pastors of the current church ==
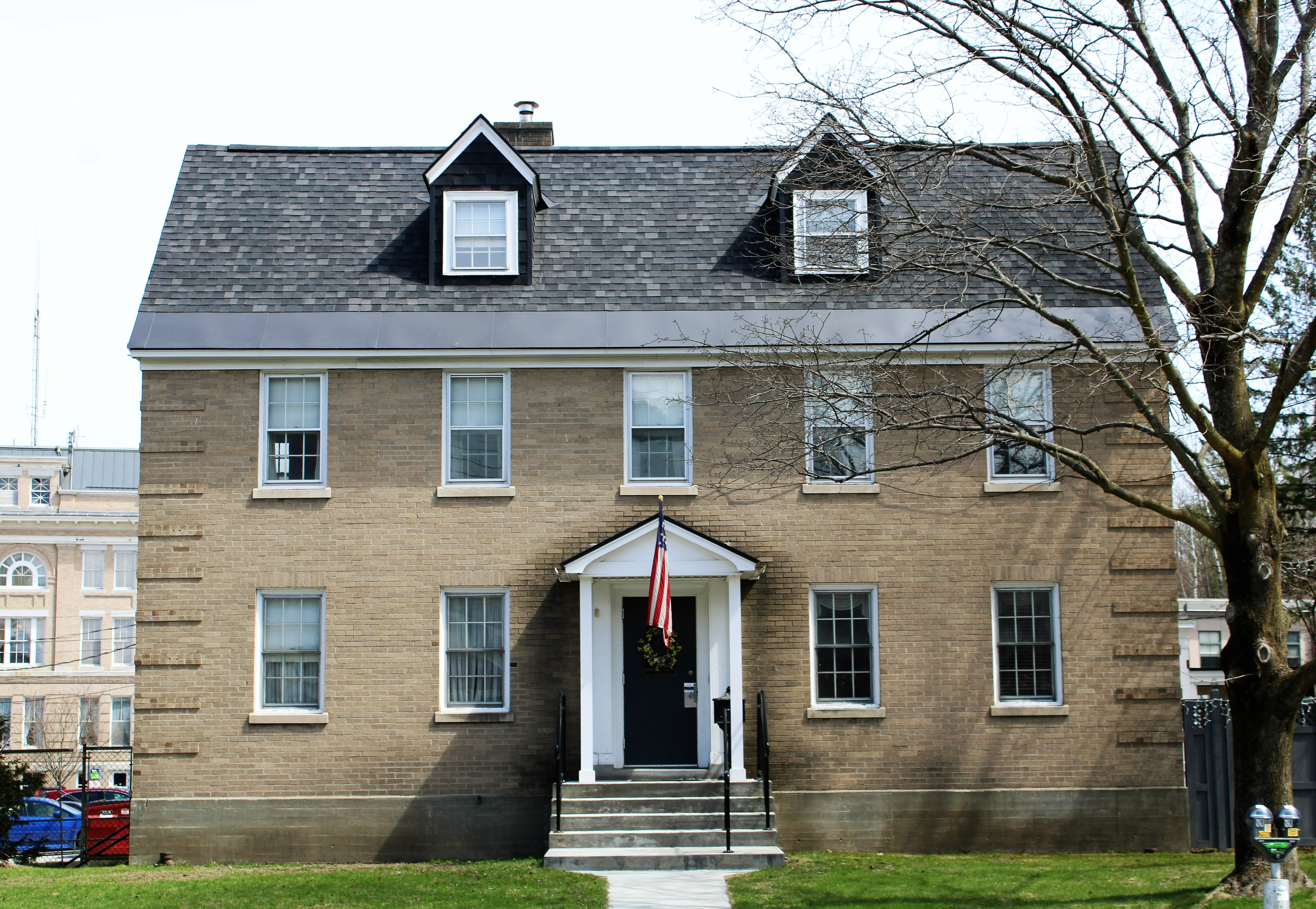
Rectory

- Fr. Joseph Duglue: 1863-1885
- Fr. William O'Sullivan: 1885-1915
- Fr. Patrick Long: 1915-1921
- Msgr. William Crosby: 1921-1959
- Fr. William Ready: 1959-1965
- Msgr. Harold Field: 1965-1975
- Msgr. Charles Marcoux: 1975-1976
- Fr. Joseph Campbell: 1976-1984
- Fr. Wendell Searles: 1984-1995
- Fr. Bernard Gaudreau: 1995-1997
- Fr. William Boudin: 1997-2000
- Fr. Thomas Mosher: 2001-2005
- Fr. Michael Augustinowitz: 2005–2016
- Msgr. Peter Routhier: 2016-2017
- Fr. Julian Asucan: 2017-2023
- Fr. Patrick Forman: 2023-
