= Cathedral of Saint Joseph (Burlington, Vermont) =

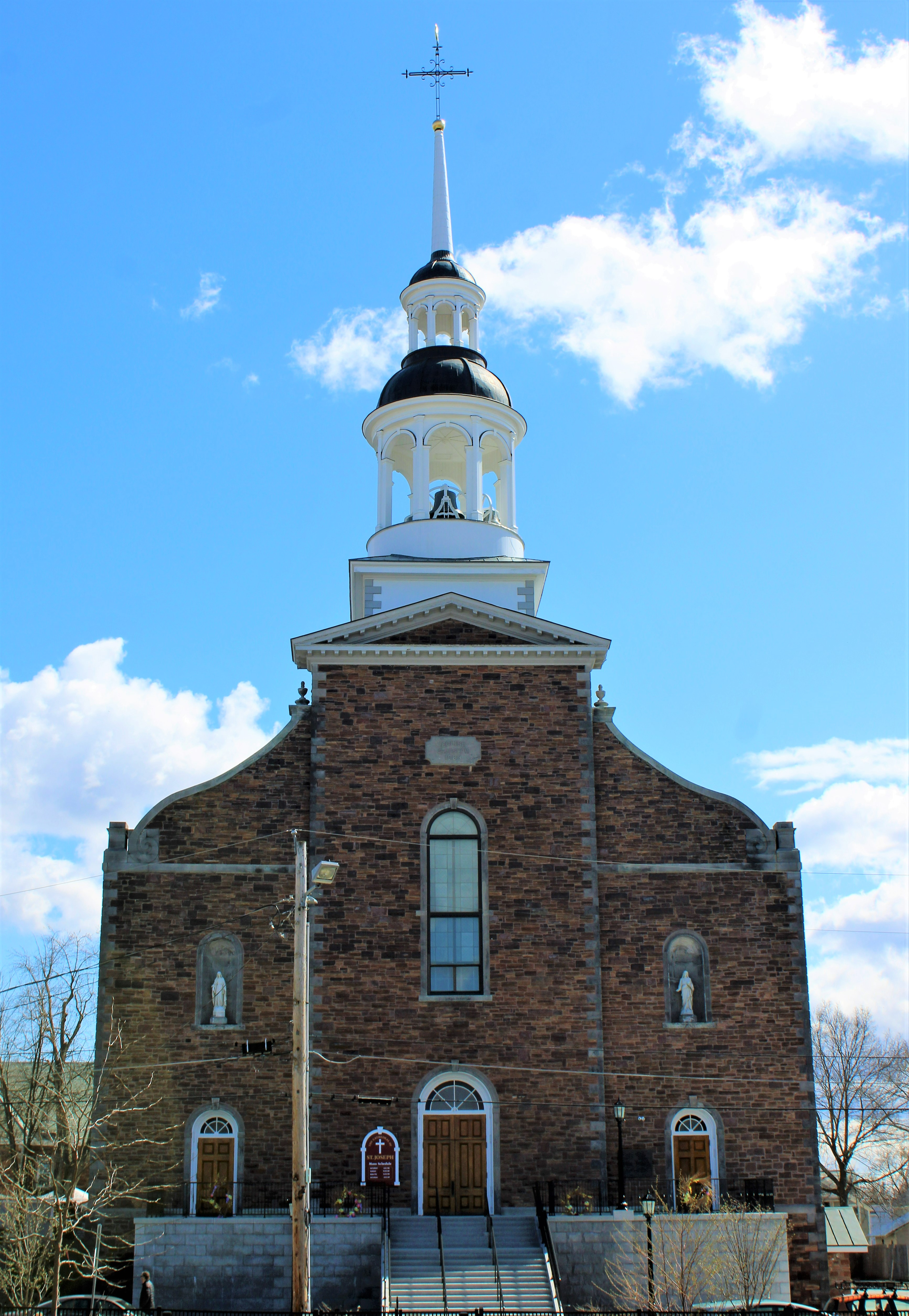
- Cathedral of Saint Joseph
- 44°29′00″N 73°12′53″W
- Location: 20 Allen St. Burlington, Vermont
- Country: United States
- Denomination: Catholic Church
- Website: stjoseph.vermontcatholic.org/cathedrals

History
- Status: Cathedral/Parish church
- Founded: 1850
- Dedication: Saint Joseph
- Dedicated: June 24, 1887

Architecture
- Functional status: Active
- Architect: Rev. Joseph Michaud
- Style: Baroque Revival
- Groundbreaking: July 4, 1884
- Completed: 1887

Specifications
- Capacity: 1,200
- Length: 176 feet (54 m)
- Width: 81 feet (25 m)
- Height: 55 feet (17 m)
- Materials: Red sandstone

Administration
- Diocese: Burlington

Clergy
- Bishop: Most Rev. John Joseph McDermott
- Rector: Rev. Msgr. Peter A. Routhier

The Cathedral of Saint Joseph located in Burlington, Vermont, United States, is the seat of the Catholic Diocese of Burlington. It served as the co-cathedral of the diocese from 1999 to 2018 when it became the cathedral church following the closure of the Cathedral of the Immaculate Conception in Burlington.

== History ==
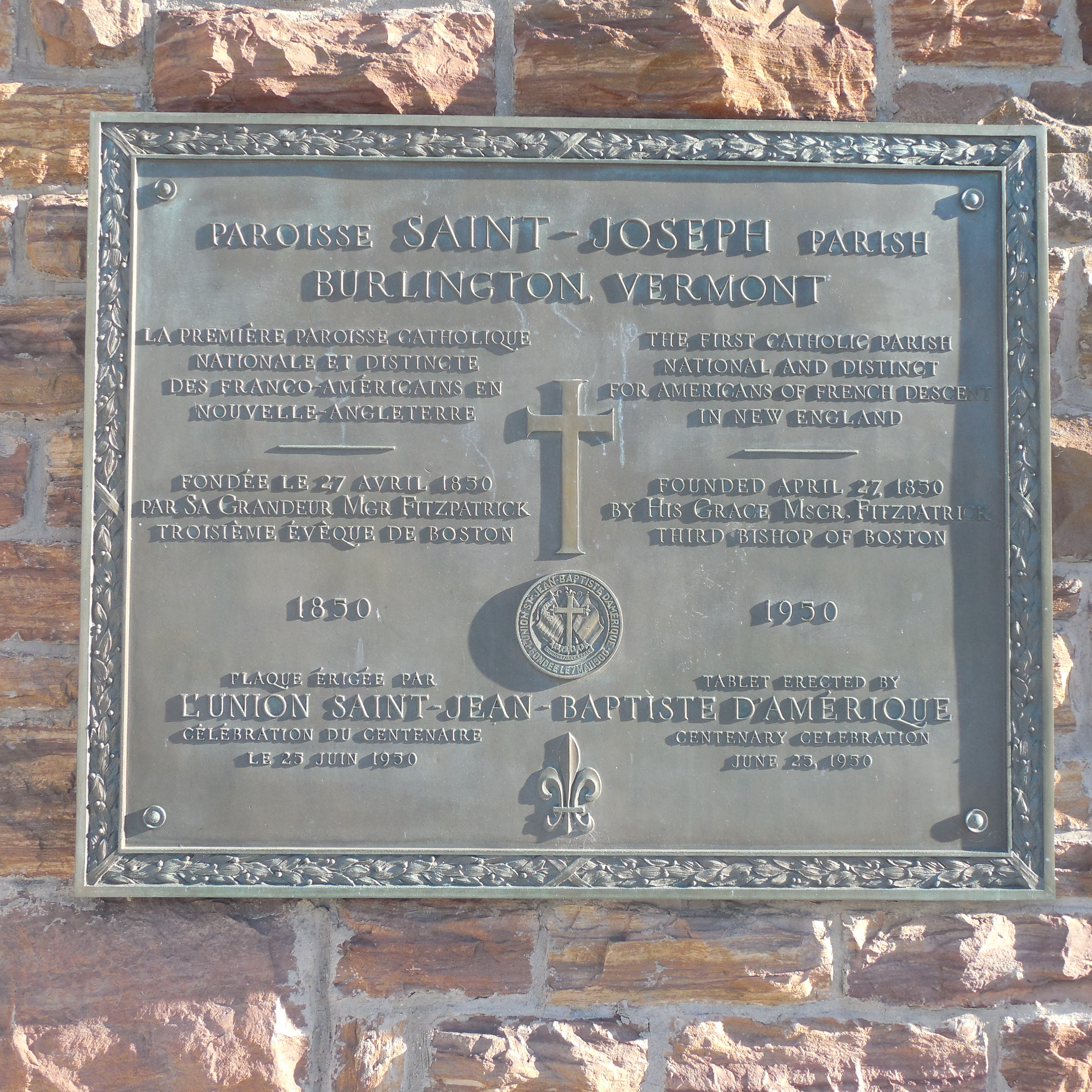
Centennial plaque of Saint Joseph Parish

Col. Archibald Hyde donated land for the first Catholic Church built in Burlington, which served both Irish and French Canadian immigrants. The French-speaking members felt like second-class citizens in the predominantly Irish congregation. After raising the necessary funds and another donation of land, St. Joseph's parish was established as the first French Canadian parish in the United States in 1850. A church was constructed to serve the growing French-speaking Canadian population that had immigrated to the North End of Burlington during the mid-19th century.

The present church building was designed in 1883 by Rev. Joseph Michaud who was a self-taught architect hailing from Montreal. He used the Chapel of the Palace of Versailles as his inspiration. The cornerstone was laid on July 4, 1884. It took four years to complete the structure, which relied on the labor and financial sacrifices of its parishioners. The church was dedicated on St. Jean the Baptist Day (Fête de la Saint-Jean-Baptiste) on June 24, 1887, and blessed by the Archbishop of Montreal, Édouard-Charles Fabre. The church's seating capacity was designed to accommodate over 1,200 worshipers, and it remains the largest church in Vermont. St. Joseph's has been renovated in 1920, 1968, and 2000–2001. It was named the co-cathedral for the Burlington diocese in 1999.

Because of low attendance and finances, the process for merging the two Burlington Catholic cathedrals began in 2017. Sunday Masses were celebrated at St. Joseph, while Immaculate Conception had a weekday Mass at Noon and a monthly Mass in Vietnamese. The title to the Immaculate Conception property was transferred to St. Joseph Parish. In April 2018 Bishop Christopher Coyne decreed that St. Joseph was the sole diocesan cathedral, and later in the year relegated the Immaculate Conception building to secular use. On October 11, 2018, the Diocese of Burlington announced that it would sell the Immaculate Conception property. The last Mass was celebrated in Immaculate Conception Church on December 8, 2018.

=== Steeple ===
A violent storm in November 2010 damaged St. Joseph's steeple, and the top portion of it had to be removed in April of the following year. Repair crews had found that the structure had undergone severe deterioration and it was subsequently determined that the 800 lb (360 kg) wrought-iron cross on top was at risk of toppling. The cross was placed into storage, while the lower sections of the steeple (e.g. the belfry) required renovations costing about $200,000. Efforts to restore the steeple to its original height were delayed due to the estimated expense of $1 million, which the church could not afford. Through donations to the repair fund and the sale of the parish's school building in April 2018 the necessary funds became available. The project was completed in May 2019.

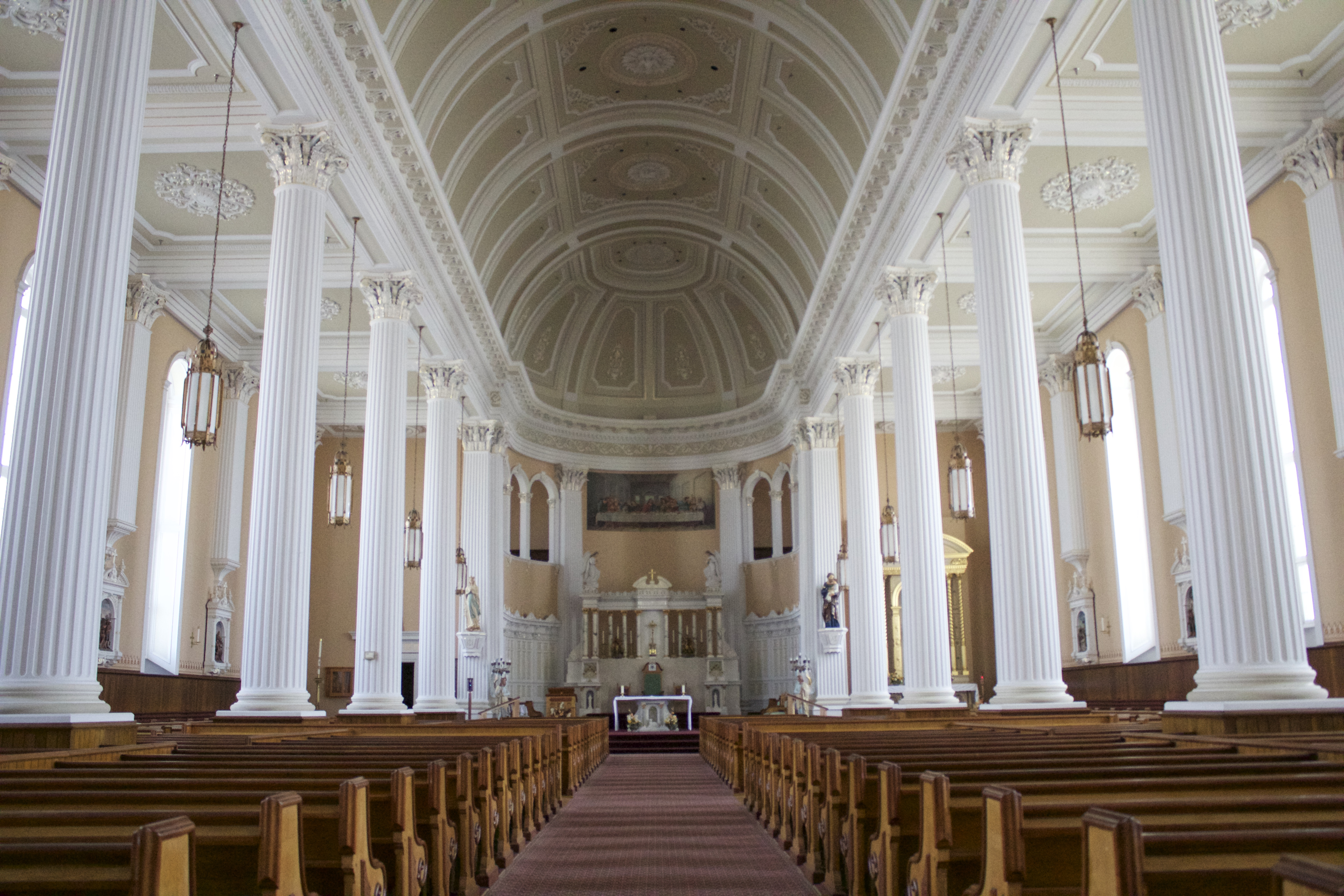
Cathedral interior

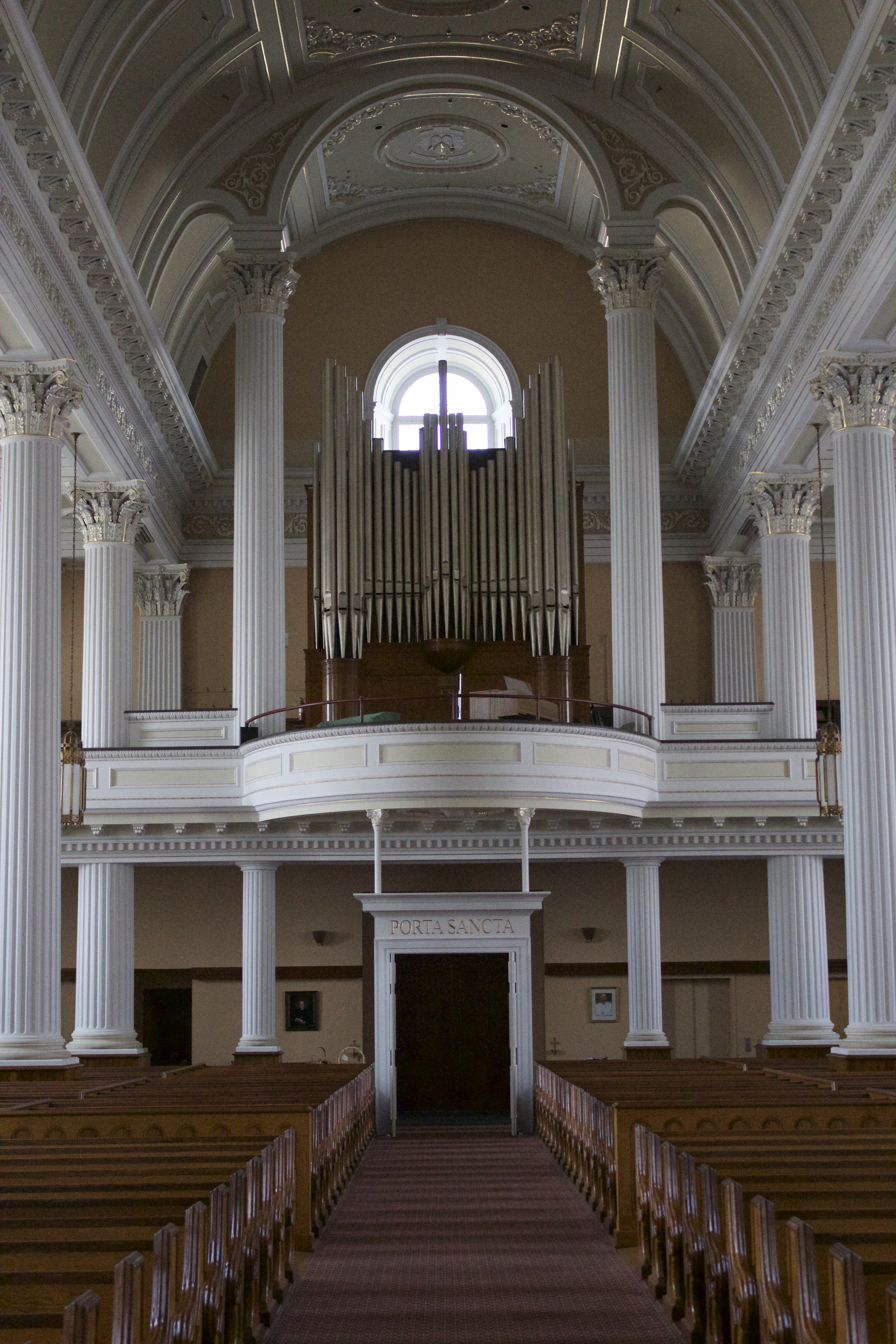
Rear gallery and pipe organ

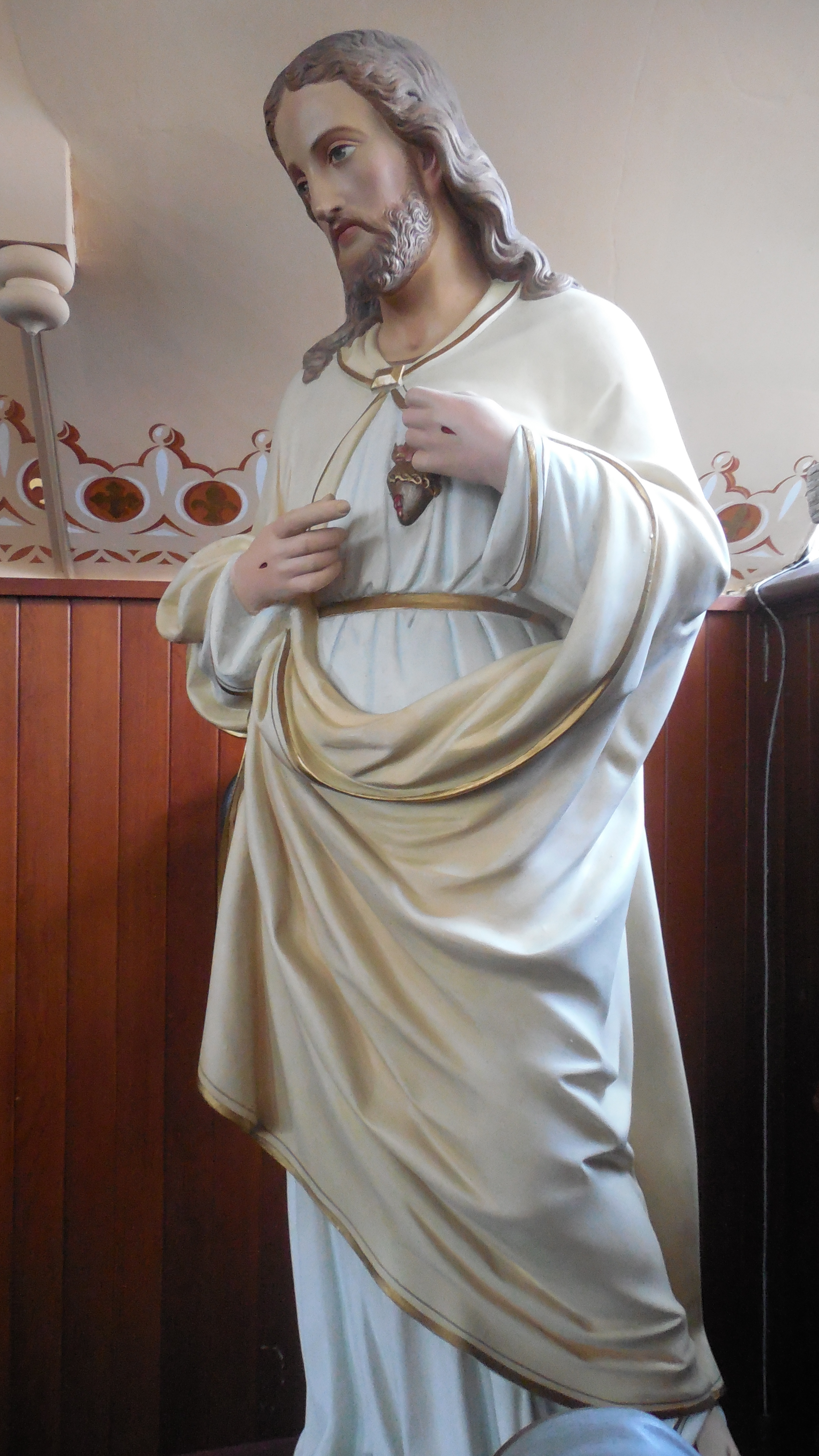
Statue of Christ

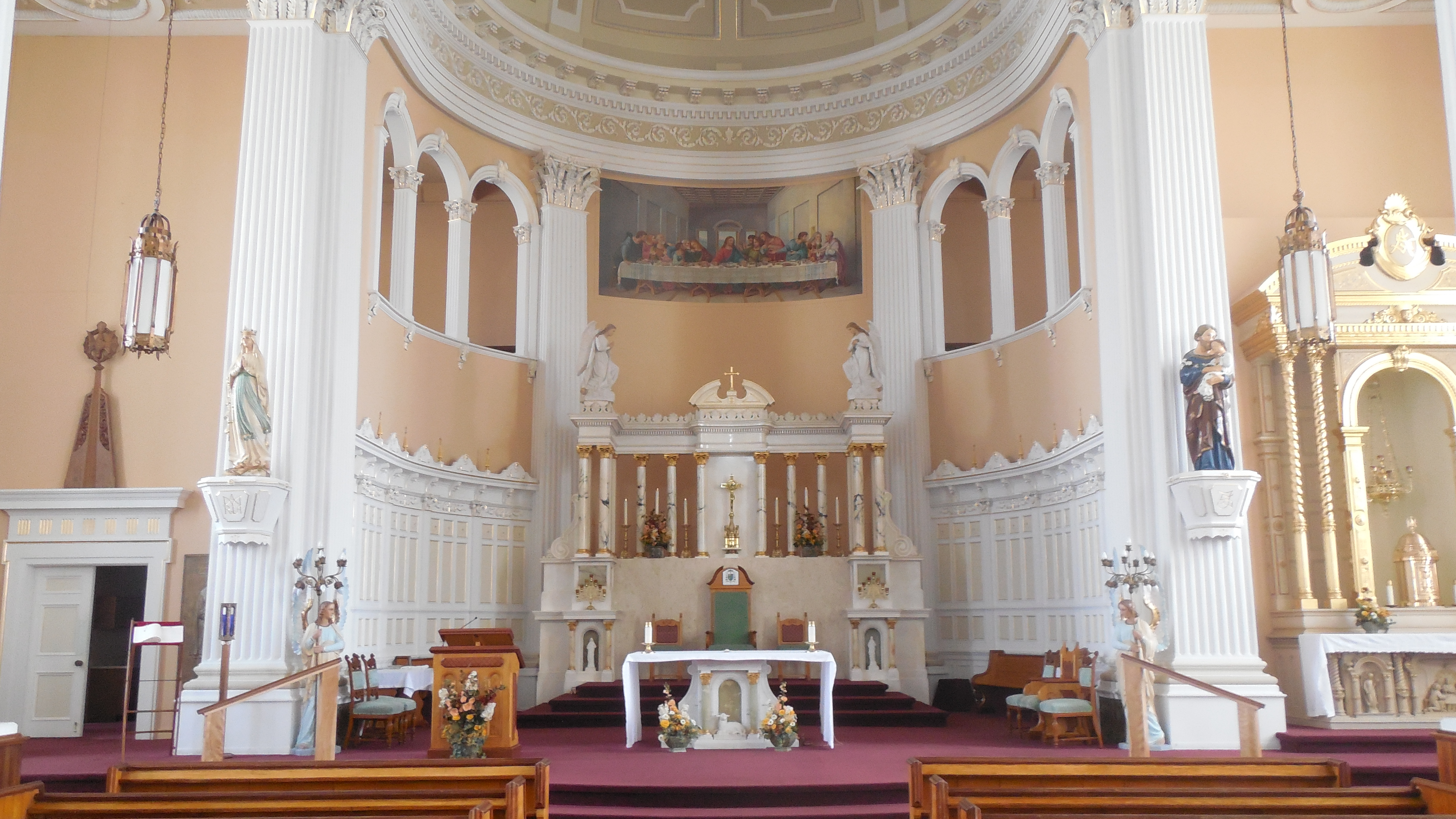
Altar

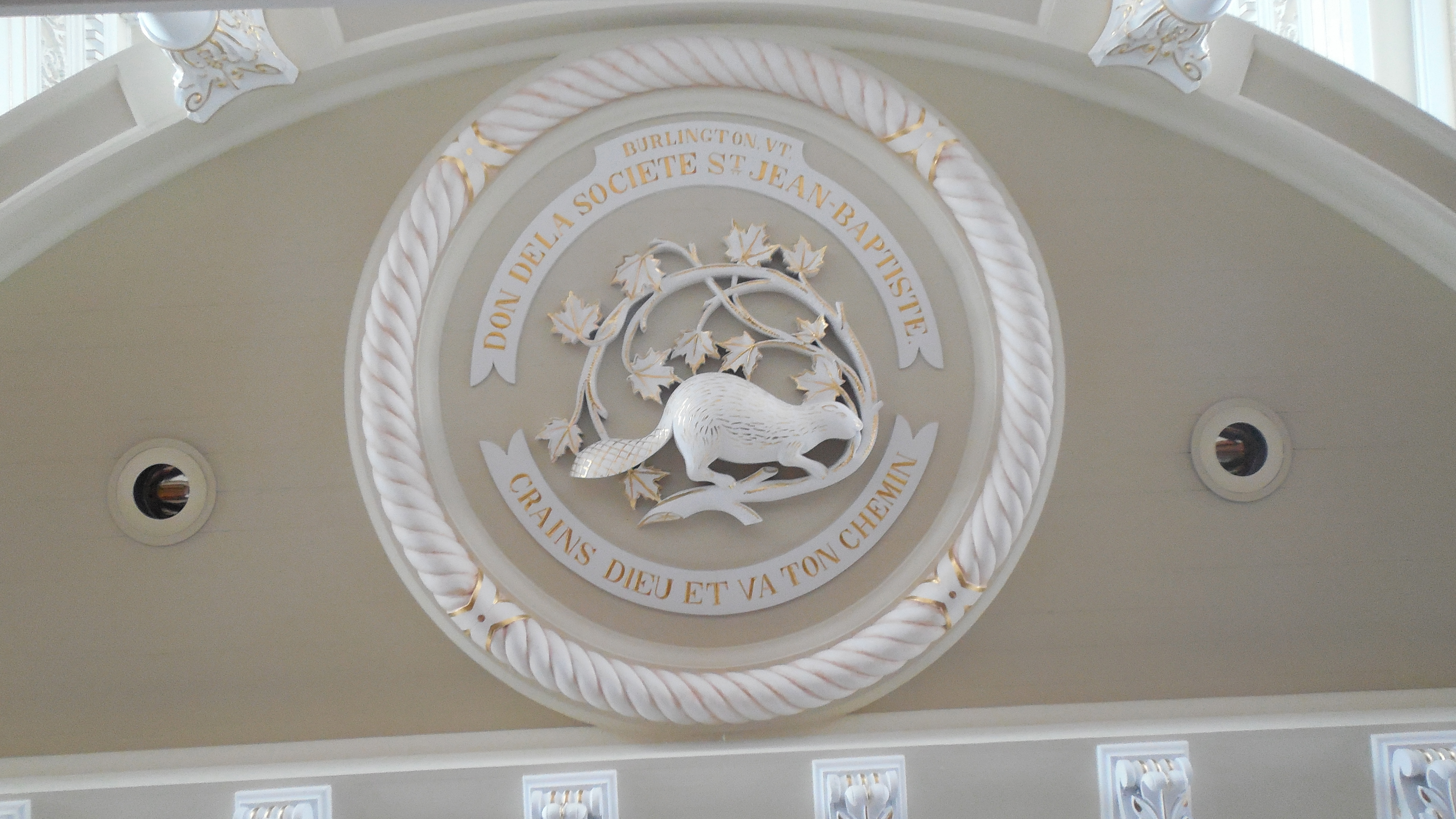
Ceiling Emblem

== See also ==
- List of Catholic cathedrals in the United States
- List of cathedrals in the United States
