= Jeremiah O'Callaghan =

Roman Catholic priest (1780–1861)

Jeremiah O'Callaghan (1780–1861) was an Irish Roman Catholic priest born in 1780 in Dooneens, a townland near Macroom, Co. Cork. He was known for his views against usury and his ministries in Vermont and Massachusetts in the 19th century.

== Early career & controversy ==
He was educated at St. Patrick's, Carlow College before being ordained by Bishop William Coppinger in 1805. He was first appointed as a curate in Cape Clear and then sent to Aghnakishey in Country Cork in the Diocese of Cloyne and Ross. He became bothered by the concept of usury in 1819 and studied its history in ecclesiastical law. Through his studies, he concluded that usury went against the word of God. When he refused to absolve a local corn-dealer known for charging interest during last rites, other local businessmen complained. Bishop Coppinger punished O'Callaghan by barring him from refusing sacraments from usurers. Later, Coppinger forbade him from delivering Mass and vowed to use his clout to ensure no other bishop would hire him.

== O'Callaghan in America ==
O'Callaghan was a native speaker of the Irish language. In July 1830, he conducted an Irish-language mass in the Cathedral in Boston.

=== Vermont ===
O'Callaghan was sent to Burlington, Vermont by the Jesuit Benedict Joseph Fenwick in 1830 to serve as Burlington's first resident priest. In 1833, Father O'Callaghan had St. Mary's church built in St. Albans, north of Burlington. O'Callaghan served in Vermont for 23 years and was known as the "Apostle of Vermont."

=== Massachusetts ===
O'Callaghan was appointed as the first resident priest of Holyoke, Massachusetts in 1856. Under his leadership, St. Jerome's Catholic Church was established that same year. He died in Holyoke in 1861.

=== Writing ===
In 1834, O'Callaghan self-published Usury, Funds, and Banks : Also, Forestalling Traffick, and Monopoly. In this work, he shared a brief autobiography and a detailed description of his controversy with Bishop William Coppinger.
