= Christopher J. Coyne =

American Catholic prelate (born 1958)

His Excellency, The Most Reverend Christopher J. Coyne
- Archbishop of Hartford
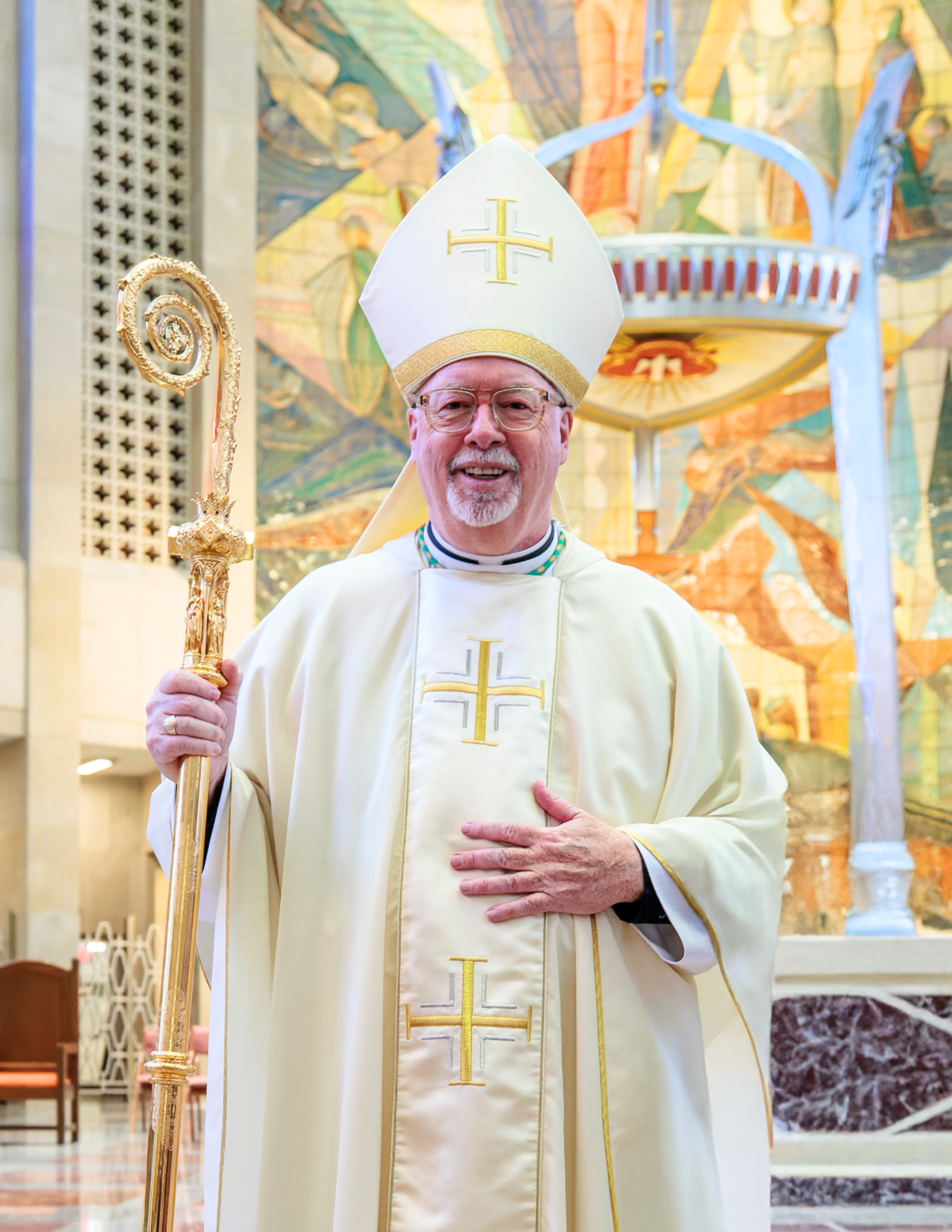
- Coyne in 2025
- Church: Catholic
- Archdiocese: Hartford
- Appointed: June 26, 2023 (as coadjutor)
- Installed: May 1, 2024
- Predecessor: Leonard Paul Blair
- Previous posts: Auxiliary Bishop of Indianapolis and Titular Bishop of Mopta (2011–2014); Bishop of Burlington (2015–2023)

Orders
- Ordination: June 7, 1986 by Bernard Francis Law
- Consecration: March 2, 2011 by Daniel M. Buechlein, Richard Lennon, and Paul D. Etienne

Personal details
- Born: June 17, 1958 (age 68) Woburn, Massachusetts, US
- Education: University of Massachusetts Lowell; Saint John's Seminary; Pontifical Liturgical Institute
- Motto: Trust in the Lord
- Styles
- Reference style: His Excellency; The Most Reverend
- Spoken style: Your Excellency
- Religious style: Archbishop

Christopher James Coyne (born June 17, 1958) is an American Catholic prelate serving as Archbishop of Hartford since 2024. He was coadjutor archbishop from 2023 to 2024.

Coyne also served as administrator of the Diocese of Burlington from 2023 to 2024. Coyne previously served as Bishop of Burlington from 2015 to 2023 and as an auxiliary bishop in the Archdiocese of Indianapolis from 2011 to 2015.

== Biography ==
=== Early life and education ===
Coyne was born on June 17, 1958, in Woburn, Massachusetts, to Rita and Bill Coyne, a postal worker and a parish secretary. He had three older brothers and three younger sisters. He attended public schools in Woburn, graduating from Woburn Memorial High School in 1976. He served as a staff member at Parker Mountain Scout Reservation, Barnsted, NH. In 1980, Coyne received a Bachelor of Business Administration degree from the University of Massachusetts Lowell in Lowell, Massachusetts. To pay for college, he worked multiple jobs, including stints as a YMCA lifeguard, in retail at Sears, and bartending. For two years after graduation, Coyne worked as a bartender, to earn money as a seminarian. Having decided to enter the priesthood, Coyne enrolled in 1982 at St. John's Seminary in Boston. He graduated in 1986 with a Master of Divinity degree.

=== Priesthood ===
On June 7, 1986, Coyne was ordained a priest for the Archdiocese of Boston by Cardinal Bernard Law at the Cathedral of the Holy Cross in Boston. After his ordination, the archdiocese assigned Coyne as parochial vicar for St. Mary of the Hills Parish in Milton, Massachusetts.

Coyne went to Rome in 1989 to study at the Pontifical Liturgical Institute. In 1992, he earned his Licentiate in Sacred Theology and in 1994 his Doctor of Sacred Liturgy degree. In 1994, Coyne returned to Boston to become director of the pre-theology program at St. John's Seminary in Brighton (a neighborhood in Boston). In 2004, he became an adjunct faculty member there. Coyne became director for the archdiocesan Office of Worship in 2000.

In 2002, Coyne became cabinet secretary for communications and archdiocesan spokesman in the middle of the clerical sex abuse scandal in the archdiocese. According to Coyne, he turned down two prior offers for the position from Cardinal Law. Coyne said that on accepting the job, he told Law that he would not lie or disparage victims and wanted full access to archdiocese records.

In September 2005, Law's successor in Boston, Archbishop Sean O'Malley, appointed Coyne as pastor of Our Lady Help of Christians Parish in Newton, Massachusetts. Some parishioners at Our Lady objected to O'Malley's removal of the previous pastor and continue to press for his reinstatement. Some parishioners opposed Coyne as pastor because of his previous work for Law. Coyne finally requested a transfer to another parish, which O'Malley granted in January 2006. He became pastor of Saint Margaret Mary Parish in Westwood, Massachusetts, in May 2006.

=== Auxiliary bishop of Indianapolis ===
In January 2011, Pope Benedict XVI named Coyne as an auxiliary bishop of Indianapolis and titular bishop of Mopta. On March 2, 2011, he was consecrated in St. John the Evangelist Church in Indianapolis by Archbishop Daniel Buechlein, with Bishop Richard Lennon and Bishop Paul Dennis Etienne serving as co-consecrators. Coyne was the first auxiliary bishop appointed to the archdiocese since 1933.

In March 2011, Buechlein named Coyne as vicar general, a post he would hold through 2014. From September 21, 2011, to December 3, 2014, Coyne was the apostolic administrator of the archdiocese, from Buechlein's early retirement due to ill health until the installation of Archbishop Joseph Tobin. In November 2014, Coyne was elected chair of the Committee on Communication of the United States Conference of Catholic Bishops (USCCB).

=== Bishop of Burlington ===
On December 22, 2014, Pope Francis named Coyne as bishop of Burlington. His installation occurred on January 29, 2015.

In September 2016, Coyne waived the non-disclosure agreements signed by sexual abuse victims from St. Joseph's Orphanage in Burlington who previously settled lawsuits against the diocese. He said that he wanted them to tell their abuse stories without fear of being sued. In December 2020, Coyne apologized to the victims after the release of an investigative report by the State of Vermont that verified sexual abuse crimes at St. Joseph's:

I absolutely believe that children were abused at the orphanage. No one is contesting that at all. Any victim of abuse at the hands of clergy of the church is an awful thing and I can't apologize enough.

=== Coadjutor archbishop of Hartford ===
The coat of arms used by Archbishop Coyne as coadjutor archbishop of Hartford from June 2023 to May 2024.

On June 26, 2023, Francis named Coyne as coadjutor archbishop of Hartford in Connecticut. He was to also serve as apostolic administrator of Burlington until the pope appointed a new bishop there. Coyne took up residence in Hartford with a mass of welcome In October 2023. In an interview released in November 2023, Coyne expressed hope that the Catholic Church would one day ordain "deaconesses". He also suggested that the Vatican relocated away from Rome due to the "inbred" nature of Roman bureaucracy.

=== Metropolitan archbishop of Hartford ===
On May 1, 2024, Coyne succeeded Leonard Paul Blair as metropolitan archbishop of Hartford.

== See also ==
- Catholic Church hierarchy
- Catholic Church in the United States
- Historical list of the Catholic bishops of the United States
- List of Catholic bishops of the United States
- Lists of patriarchs, archbishops, and bishops

Catholic Church titles
Preceded by Leonard Paul Blair	Archbishop of Hartford; 2024–present	Succeeded by Incumbent
Preceded by -	Coadjutor Archbishop of Hartford; 2023–2024	Succeeded by -
Preceded by Salvatore Ronald Matano	Bishop of Burlington; 2015–2023	Succeeded by John Joseph McDermott
Preceded by –	Auxiliary Bishop of Indianapolis; 2010–2014	Succeeded by -
