= French Vermonters =

French Americans in Vermont, USA

French-Canadian farmers who are gathering corn on a farm near Sheldon, Vermont. Photographed by Jack Delano, Farm Security Administration, August 1941.

French Vermonters (French: Vermontois) are Americans of French descent who reside in the State of Vermont. A majority of present-day French Vermonters are descendants of French Canadians who emigrated from the Province of Quebec in the nineteenth and twentieth centuries.

Historically, French Vermonters have been more rural and more dispersed than Franco-Americans in other New England states. Though mills in Burlington and Winooski attracted immigrant workers, other French Canadians gravitated towards farms and a variety of opportunities in small towns and cities, particularly in the northern half of the state. Wherever feasible, immigrants and their descendants established distinct institutions that reflected their culture.

Over time, French Vermonters have become indistinguishable from Vermonters of other ethnic backgrounds in many respects. According to data from the American Community Survey, an estimated 8,124 Vermonters spoke French at home in 2023, representing less than 10 percent of residents who declared French or French-Canadian ancestry. Nevertheless, ethnic self-ascription persists and local organizations continue to celebrate French-Canadian heritage.

== Population profile ==
In 2023, according to the American Community Survey, approximately 58,487 Vermonters had French (except Basque) as one of their primary declared ancestries. Additionally, an estimated 46,459 state residents had French-Canadian ancestry. When combined, these categories amount to the third largest ancestry group in the state after people of English and Irish descent.

French Vermonters typically self-identify as French, French-Canadian, or Franco-American.

== Immigration and settlement ==
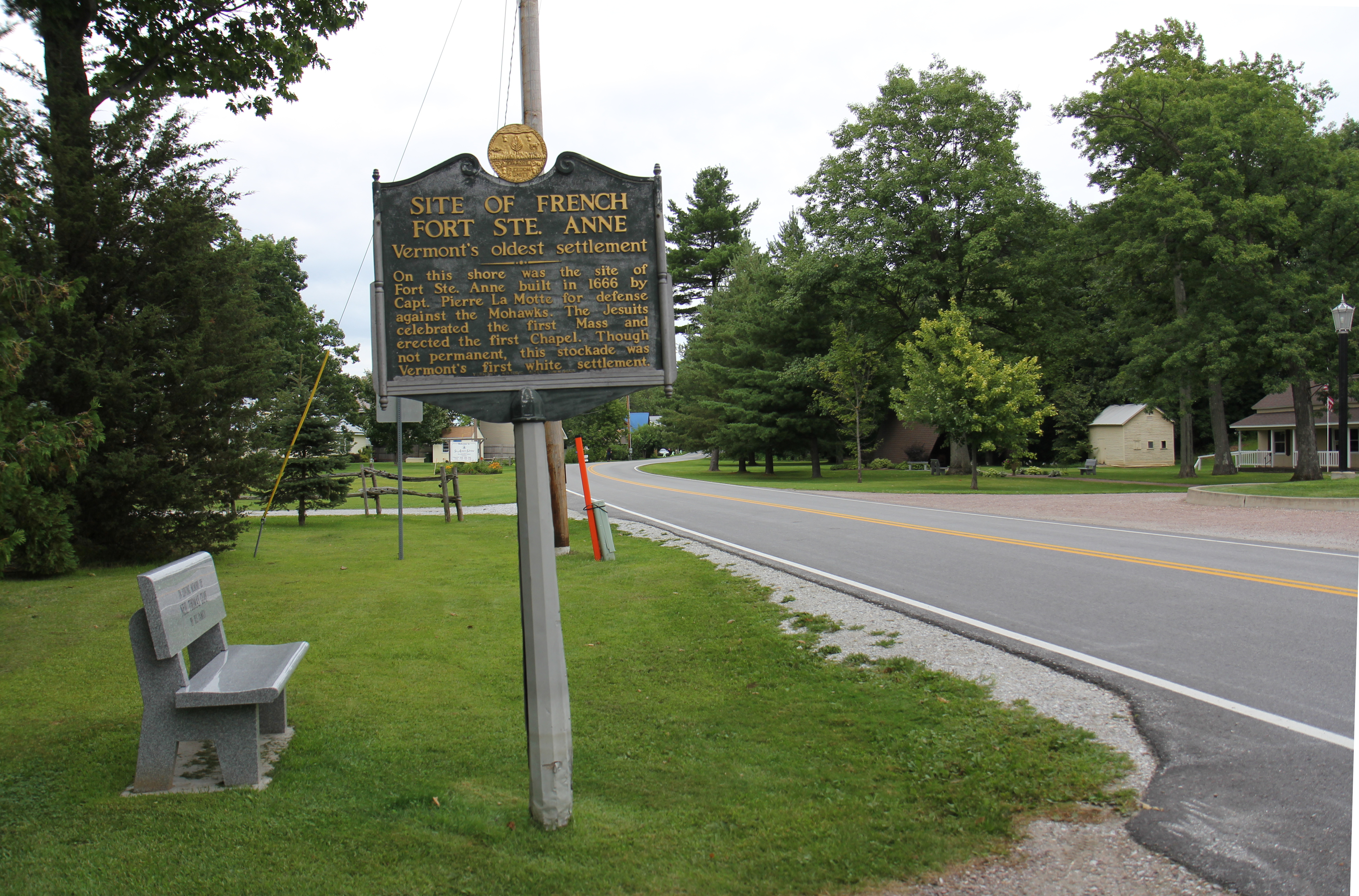
Historic markers recognize the French presence around the state. The first European settlement in the state is recognized on Isle La Motte.

French explorer Samuel de Champlain visited Lake Champlain in 1609 and French troops built a fort on Isle La Motte in 1666. Conflict with the Iroquois deterred sustained efforts to colonize the shores of the lake. Governors of New France began to grant seigneuries in the region in the 1690s. The largest hub of population may have been the area surrounding Chimney Point (present-day Addison, Vermont), where, in 1756, there were some 300 French settlers. The settlers removed as British forces took control of the lake during the Seven Years' War.

The Republic of Vermont was founded in the midst of the Revolutionary War in 1777. The U.S. Congress admitted it to the Union in 1791. Although "Vermont" is etymologically French, the name does not date from the French colonial period. The term was a purposeful translation of "Green Mountains" and may not have come into use before 1777.

Economic and political challenges afflicting Lower Canada (later Quebec) in the first half of the nineteenth century led to the emigration of French Canadians. The colony experienced rapid population growth, which limited young people's ability to acquire land. The wheat midge and potato rot caused crop failures. The unsuccessful Rebellions of 1837-1838 created a wave of political refugees. Gradually, through international travel and trade, residents of Lower Canada learned about opportunities for wage labor along Lake Champlain and on the farms of northern Vermont. Early migrations were seasonal or temporary; the young men crossing the border expected to return home. Soon, family units were traveling to Vermont and some opted to remain.

Alongside New York State and Maine, Vermont was a leading destination for French-Canadian migrants in the 1840s and 1850s. In 1850, according to geographer Ralph Vicero, nearly half of French Canadians in New England lived in four counties fronting Lake Champlain in northwestern Vermont. At that time, 18 Vermont towns had at least 200 French-Canadian residents, Burlington and St. Albans being the largest. A decade later, Vermont was still the leading field of migration in New England with a French-heritage population of 16,600.

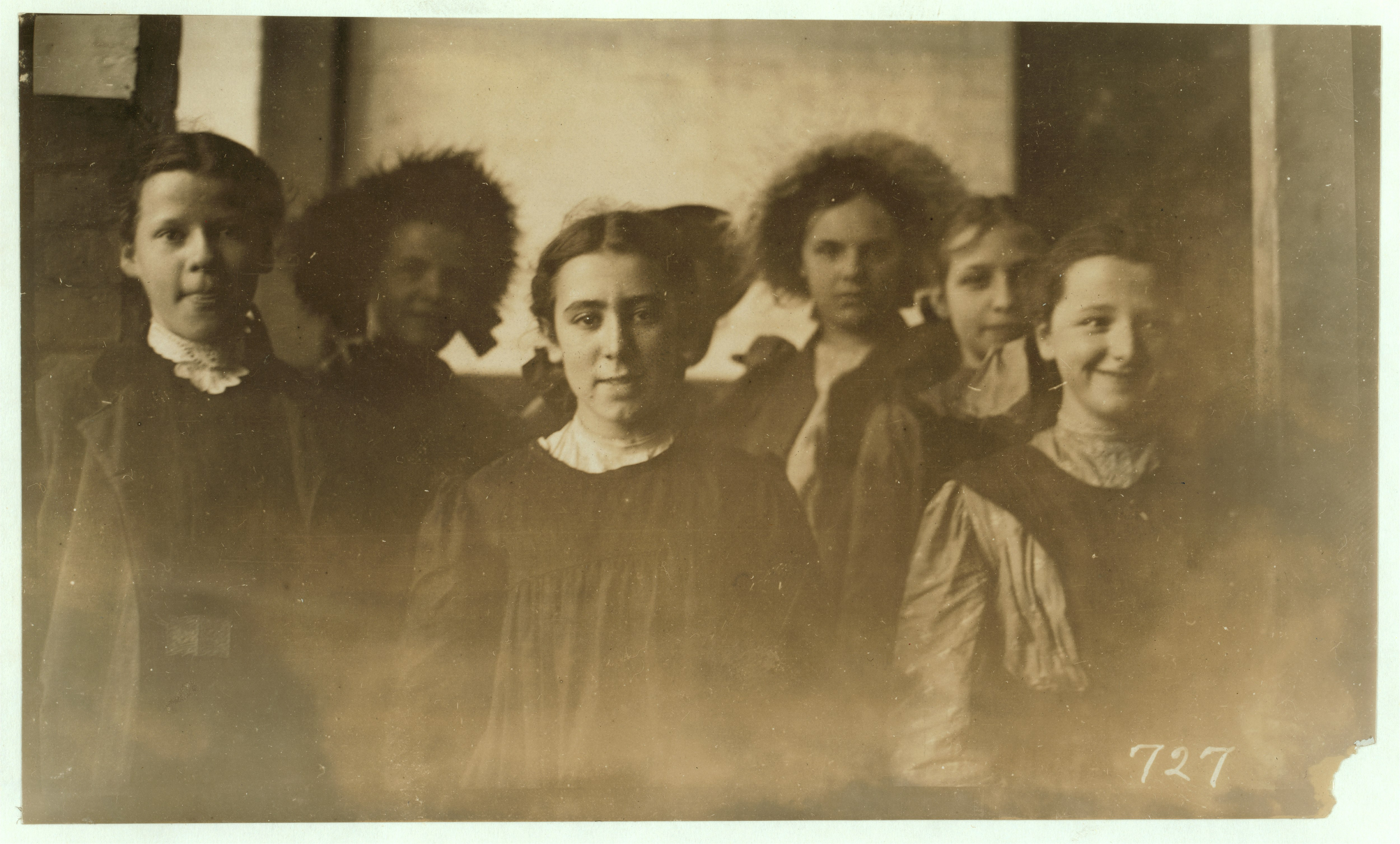
Female workers from the Winooski woolen mill photographed by Lewis Hine, May 1909.

Textile mills in Burlington and Winooski relied to a great extent on the labor of French Canadians. However, the immigrants and their descendants worked in a variety of regions and economic sectors: the farms of Franklin County, the rail yards of St. Albans and St. Johnsbury, the granite industry in and around Barre, etc.

Though other states surpassed Vermont as destinations around the time of the U.S. Civil War, migration continued. Had it not been for Canadian immigration, Vermont's total population would likely have fallen between 1860 and 1890 (the state only added 17,000 people in that period).

At the census of 1890, the first to systematically distinguish English and French Canadians, Vermont had 44,088 foreign-born residents; 25,004 of them (57 percent) were Canadian-born. More than 4,000 of this group were living in Chittenden County. The next leading counties were Franklin and Orleans.

Among American-born Vermonters with two parents born in a specified country, 4,025 had English-Canadian parentage; 11,132 had French-Canadian parentage. This indicates that approximately three-fourths of Canadian immigrants to Vermont were of French descent. There were 7,400 American-born Vermonters with one native parent and one French Canadian. All told, in 1890, regardless of place of birth, approximately 38,000 Vermonters had at least one French-Canadian parent. This figure does not include French Vermonters whose grandparents immigrated from Quebec.

By comparison, in 1890, only 175 state residents declared France as their place of birth, with Orleans, Chittenden, and Rutland counties being home to the largest populations.

== Culture ==
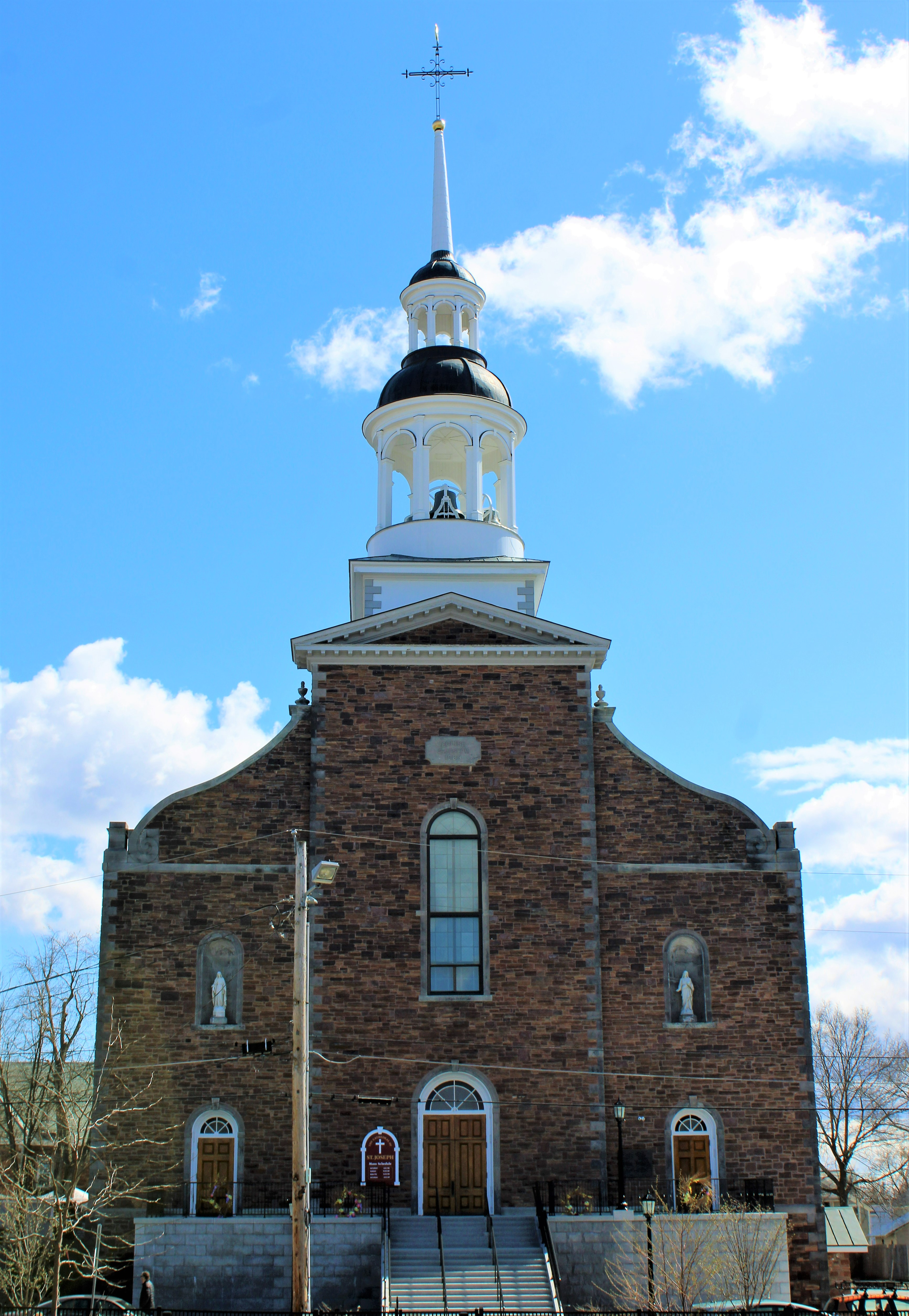
The parish of St. Joseph served predominantly French-Canadian Catholics beginning in 1850. This structure dates from the 1880s.

Ludger Duvernay, a political refugee, founded the first French-language newspaper in New England, Le Patriote canadien, in Burlington in 1839. A strong critic of the British administration of Lower Canada, the paper appeared for six months. Later attempts to publish francophone papers also struggled with financial viability. The most successful was Le Protecteur canadien, founded by Antoine Moussette and Father Zéphirin Druon in St. Albans in 1868. L'Avenir national succeeded it in 1871; it appeared until 1872. The limited means of migrants and their geographical dispersal were factors in the challenges faced by francophone newspapers in northern New England.

French-Canadian immigrants were more successful in the religious realm. Beginning in the 1840s, they sought to have distinct Catholic churches served by francophone priests. The first official French-Canadian national parish in New England was established in Burlington in 1850. Three years later, the Diocese of Burlington was created out of the Diocese of Boston. Louis de Goesbriand, a native of Brittany, in France, became the first bishop. He served from 1853 to 1899. His successor, John Stephen Michaud, was French-Canadian through his father. People of French descent served Catholic communities as members of religious orders, for instance the Society of St. Edmund and the Daughters of the Holy Spirit in Swanton.

Though efforts to separate from existing churches with Irish congregations and different traditions occasionally caused conflict, they also proved successful in many locations. Some communities were known to have an "Irish" and a "French" church: St. Albans had St. Mary's and Holy Angels, for instance, and Winooski had St. Stephen's and St. Francis Xavier's.

French Vermonters also established local cultural organizations or joined regional ones, like the Union Saint-Jean-Baptiste d'Amérique, to protect their interests. Some of these groups had female auxiliaries; women might also join their local parish's Ladies of St. Anne. Bilingual education was available in the bigger population centers. Elsewhere, children attended public schools that contributed to anglicization.

As in Quebec, the social life of French Vermonters revolved around their immediate and extended family. Many maintained close ties to siblings and other relatives north of the border.

== Marginalization ==
Migrant French Canadians struggled with poverty and a language barrier. Many Vermonters had proven sympathetic to the Rebellions of 1837-1838, but perceptions changed as thousands of migrants from Lower Canada settled in the state at mid-century. French Canadians were seen as less advanced, even less civilized. Their faith and the institutions they founded nourished the cultural anxieties of Anglo-Saxon Protestants who had been raised in a well-established anti-Catholic traditions.

In the 1890s, Rowland Robinson voiced xenophobic sentiments in Vermont: A Study of Independence. "For years," Robinson stated, "the State was infested with an inferior class of these people [French Canadians], who plied the vocation of professional beggar." He added, "[t]he character of these people is not such as to inspire the highest hope for the future of Vermont, if they should become the most numerous of its population."

In the 1920s, the Ku Klux Klan proliferated across the state. The organization pursued white supremacy; its outlook was also anti-Catholic, anti-immigrant, and anti-labor. Members held public meetings and rallies in hoods and regalia in Vermont in the middle years of the decade. There were few violent confrontations, but processions and cross burnings served to intimidate minority populations, including French Vermonters, who were then the largest ethnic minority group in the state.

In the 1920s and 1930s, the Vermont Eugenics Survey studied French-heritage families and other marginalized populations in efforts to understand how heredity produced undesirable traits. Leading figures of this group embraced a racial paradigm that placed people of color, particularly African Americans and Indigenous groups, at the bottom of a social hierarchy. French Canadians occupied an ambiguous place and the Survey's director, Harry Perkins, came to express doubts about the prevalence of "subnormalcy" among them. It remains that some French Vermonters—women in particular—did experience sterilization and institutionalization.

French Vermonters also had supporters. In the midst of state debates on English-only education, the bishop of Burlington, Joseph J. Rice, defended Franco-Americans' service during the First World War, their patriotism, and their contributions to the state. Anglo-Saxon Vermonters also spoke against the measure, which was ultimately defeated.

== Achievements ==
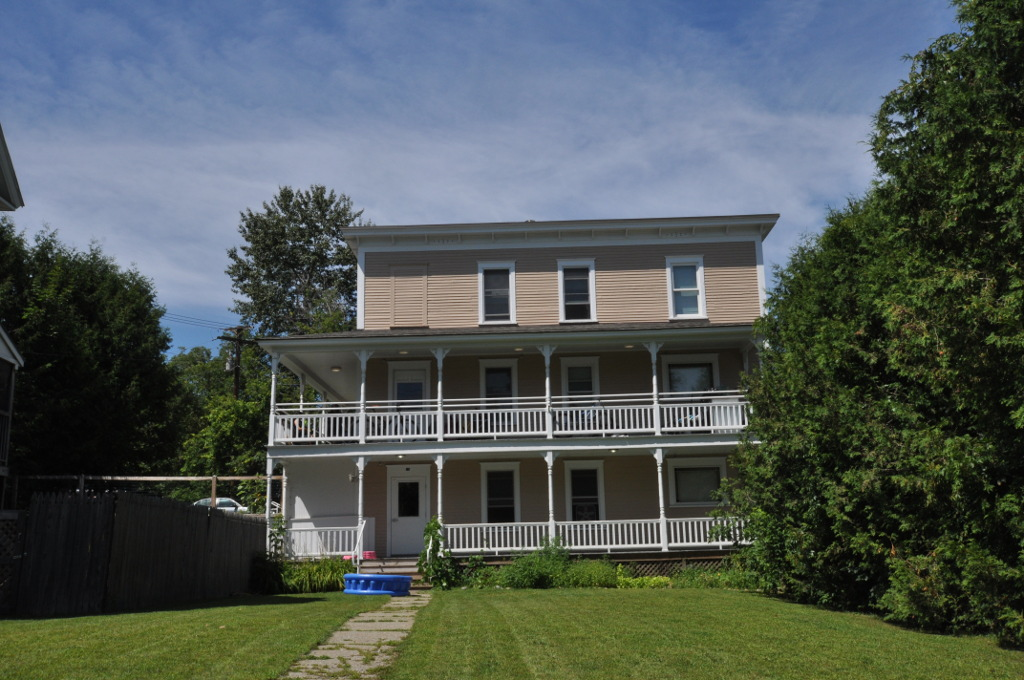
Cote Apartment House (ca. 1914), owned and occupied by the Cote and Giroux families on Elm Street in St. Johnsbury.

In addition to establishing distinct cultural institutions, French Vermonters took part in civic life and attained positions of influence. In Winooski (then part of Colchester), Francis LeClair became a selectman as early as the 1850s, thus initiating a long history of political involvement in this predominantly French mill town. In the 1940s and 1950s, French was still used informally in local council meetings. Into the postwar period, Vermont's French-heritage population tended to favor the Democratic Party. However, some individuals supported the Republicans. Among them, a St. Johnsbury dentist named Joseph Denonville Bachand was elected to the state legislature and became State Commissioner for Foreign and Domestic Commerce. An immigrant, Bachand worked tirelessly to cement closer cultural and economic ties between Vermont and Quebec.

Many French Vermonters emulated Francis LeClair and established businesses; often they served fellow French-heritage residents. In commerce, the Pomerleaus have likely been the most successful family. Antonio "Tony" Pomerleau moved to Vermont with his parents in the 1920s. He bought a grocery store in Burlington, expanded his business, and developed a multimillion-dollar real estate empire. His son Ernie followed in his footsteps; his niece Marcelle married future U.S. Senator Patrick Leahy.

Female pioneers include Philomene Ostiguy Daniels, the first woman to receive a steamboat license in the United States, and Jessie Lafountain Bigwood, the first female attorney in Vermont.

== Recent history ==
In the decades following the Second World War, urban French Vermonters experienced rapid economic change as factories closed. Their rural counterparts found it increasingly difficult to maintain a small family farm. They gravitated to new occupations in urban centers in Vermont and other states. Through the G.I. Bill, some French Vermonters were able to access a college education for the first time, thus opening opportunities for a group that had experienced limited educational attainments.

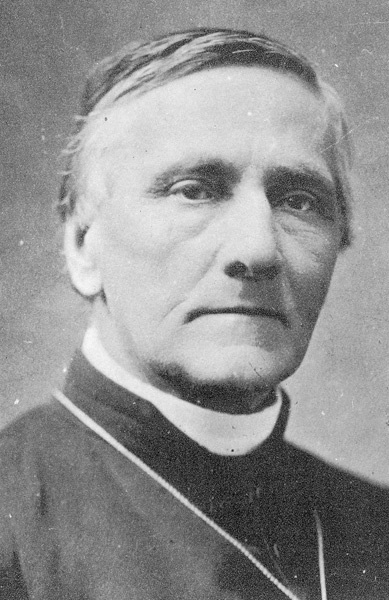
Louis de Goesbriand, a native of France, served as Catholic bishop of Burlington for more than forty years.

The most influential Franco-American state legislator, Russell Niquette, became the Democratic gubernatorial candidate in 1960. He lost the election to Ray Keyser, but outpolled John F. Kennedy, his party's presidential candidate, across the state.

Greater public recognition for French Vermonters came in the 1970s and 1908s. Governor Richard Snelling declared the fourth Sunday in June to be Franco-American Day in 1981; the following year, Mayor Bernie Sanders established the third week in June as Franco-American Week. Concerns about the status of French Vermonters led the Vermont Advisory Committee to the U.S. Commission on Civil Rights to investigate. It issued a report, "Franco-Americans in Vermont: A Civil Rights Perspective," in 1983 with Professor Peter Woolfson (University of Vermont) playing the lead role in its preparation.

Organizations like the Alliance française of the Lake Champlain Region and the Vermont French-Canadian Genealogical Society provide visibility and organize events in support of French-Canadian culture. In recent years, the Winooski French Heritage Festival and PoutineFest have created similar spaces for the culture. French heritage has also endured through the arts, for instance in the written work of Bill Schubart, the music of La Famille Beaudoin and Martha Pellerin, and the plays of Abby Paige.

In 2017, the University of Vermont hosted a conference on the past, present, and future of French Vermonters titled "French Connections." The event concluded with the signing of a memorandum of understanding between Vermont and Quebec officials for the extension of Autoroute 35 to the border.

Burlington is a sister-city of Honfleur, in France, Samuel de Champlain's home port. The relationship with France has grown with the appointment of French Vermonters Ernie Pomerleau (in 2008) and Lise Véronneau (in 2021) as honorary consuls. Vermont continues to enjoy close ties to the Province of Quebec particularly as a major tourist destination. Bilingual signage on historic panels in Burlington and other Lake Champlain locations reflects this relationship.

A state law establishing the Vermont Truth and Reconciliation Commission was enacted on May 24, 2022. The Commission's mandate includes authority to study the experiences of people of French-Canadian descent, notably experiences of "violence and discrimination systemically perpetrated by the State of Vermont."

== Famous French Vermonters ==
- Peter Clavelle, former mayor of Burlington.
- Philomene Daniels, first licensed female steamboat pilot.
- Jean Dubuc, baseball player born in St. Johnsbury.
- Louis de Goesbriand, first bishop of Burlington.
- Duane Edgar Graveline, astronaut born in Newport.
- Jessie Lafountain Bigwood, first female attorney in the state.
- John LeClair, hockey player born in St. Albans.
- Kevin Lepage, racecar driver born in Shelburne.
- "JoJo" Levesque, singer born in Brattleboro.
- John Stephen Michaud, second bishop of Burlington.
- Annie Proulx, author, long-time resident.
- Rudy Vallee, entertainer born in Island Pond.
