= List of first women lawyers and judges in Vermont =

This is a list of the first women lawyer(s) and judge(s) in Vermont. It includes the year in which the women were admitted to practice law (in parentheses). Also included are women who achieved other distinctions such becoming the first in their state to graduate from law school or become a political figure.

== Firsts in Vermont's history ==
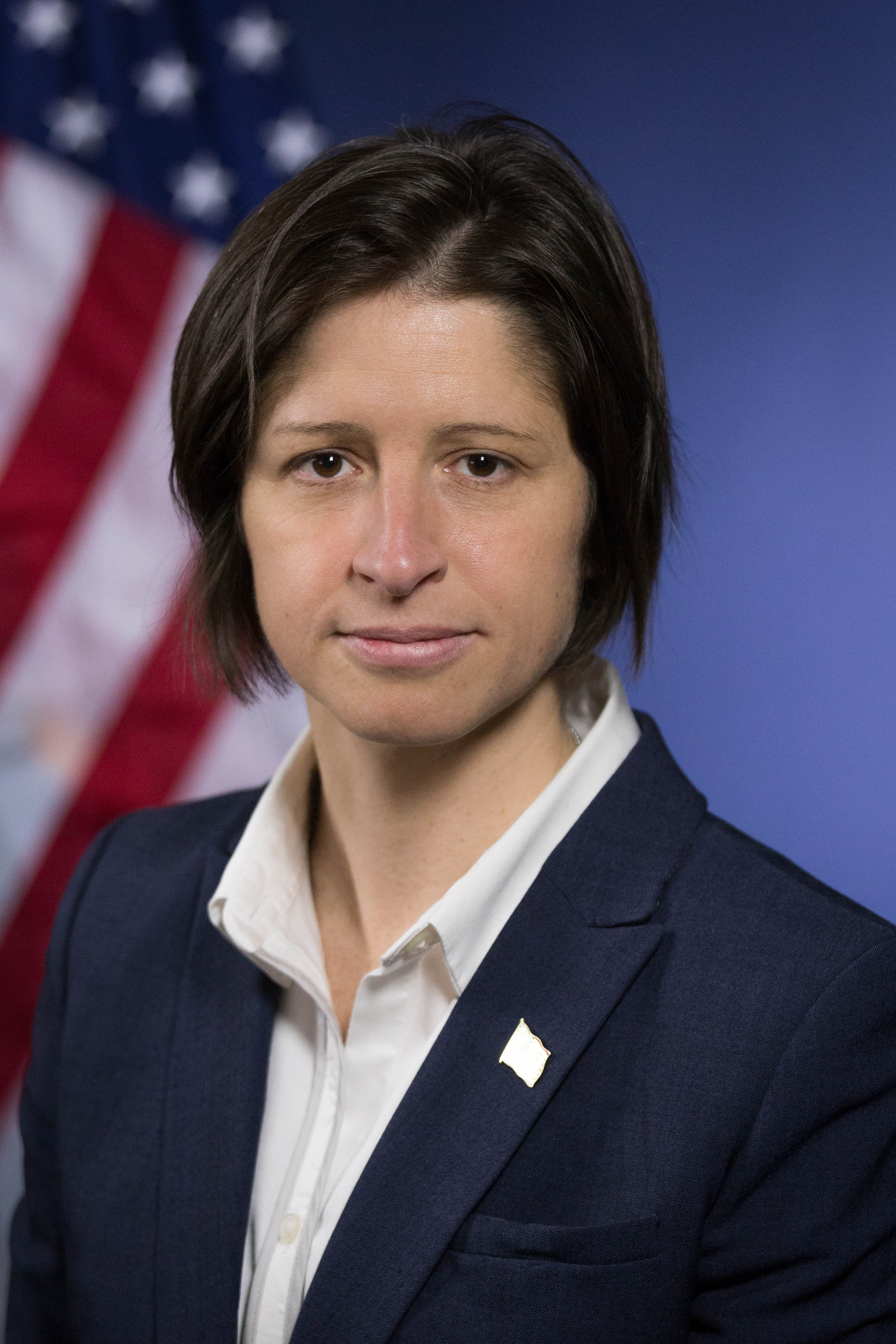
Christina E. Nolan: First female U.S. Attorney in Vermont (2017)

=== Lawyers ===
- First female: Jessie Bigwood (1902)
- First female to practice before the Vermont Supreme Court: Consuelo N. Bailey (1925) in 1926
- First female to independently try and win a murder case: Consuelo N. Bailey (1925) in 1929

=== State judges ===
- First female (justice of the peace): Beatrice Y. Brown (1922)
- First female (probate court): Mary Holden Adams (1927) from 1928-1949
- First female (trial court): Grace Johnson Murphy McGuire (1940) in 1965
- First female (state-level trial court): Linda Levitt (1975) in 1984
- First female (environmental): Merideth Wright in 1990
- First female (Supreme Court of Vermont): Denise R. Johnson (1980) in 1990
- First openly lesbian female (Supreme Court of Vermont): Beth Robinson (1989) in 2011
- First female to judicially serve the same time as her spouse: Kirstin Schoonover in 2015
- First woman of color (Chinese descent) (Supreme Court of Vermont): Nancy Waples in 2022

=== Federal judges ===
- First female (U.S. District Court for the District of Vermont): Christina Reiss (1980) in 2009
- First openly lesbian female (U.S. Court of Appeals for the Second Circuit in Vermont): Beth Robinson (1989) in 2021

=== Attorney General of Vermont ===
- First female: Charity Clark in 2022

=== Assistant Attorney General ===
- First female: Georgiana Miranda around 1972

=== State's Attorney ===
- First female: Consuelo N. Bailey (1925) in 1927

=== United States Attorney ===
- First female (acting): Eugenia Cowles in 2014
- First female (permanent): Christina E. Nolan in 2017

=== Political Office ===
- First female (Lieutenant Governor): Consuelo N. Bailey (1925) in 1955

=== Vermont Bar Association ===
- First female (president): Ellen Mercer Fallon (1977) from 1987-1988

== Firsts in local history ==
- Beatrice Y. Brown (1922): First female lawyer in Southern Vermont
- Madeline Cecelia Wood: First female probate judge in Addison County, Vermont (1938)
- Mary Adams (1926): First female probate judge in Bennington County, Vermont (1928–1949)
- Consuelo N. Bailey (1925): First female State's Attorney in Chittenden County, Vermont (1927)
- Jessica Brown: First African American female appointed as the Burlington City Attorney, Chittenden County, Vermont (2024)

== See also ==
- List of first women lawyers and judges in the United States
- Timeline of women lawyers in the United States
- Women in law

== Other topics of interest ==
- List of first minority male lawyers and judges in the United States
- List of first minority male lawyers and judges in Vermont
