= Joseph John Rice =

American prelate

His Excellency, The Most Reverend Joseph John Rice
- Bishop of Burlington
- Church: Roman Catholic Church
- See: Burlington
- In office: April 14, 1910—April 1, 1938
- Predecessor: John Stephen Michaud
- Successor: Matthew Francis Brady

Orders
- Ordination: September 29, 1894 by Thomas Beaven
- Consecration: April 14, 1910 by Thomas Beaven

Personal details
- Born: December 6, 1871 Leicester, Massachusetts, US
- Died: April 1, 1938 (aged 66) Burlington, Vermont, US
- Education: College of the Holy Cross; Grand Seminary of Montreal; College of the Propaganda
- Motto: Omnia omnibus (Everything in everything)
- Coat of arms

Joseph John Rice (December 6, 1871—April 1, 1938) was an American prelate of the Roman Catholic Church. He served as bishop of the Diocese of Burlington in Vermont from 1910 until his death in 1938.

== Biography ==
=== Early life ===
Joseph Rice was born on December 6, 1871, in Leicester, Massachusetts, to Henry and Catherine (née Donnelly) Rice. After graduating from Leicester Academy in Leicester in 1888, he studied at the College of the Holy Cross in Worcester, Massachusetts (1888–1891), and at the Grand Seminary of Montreal in Montreal, Quebec (1891–1894).

=== Priesthood ===
Returning to Massachusetts, Rice was ordained to the priesthood for the Diocese of Springfield in Massachusetts by Bishop Thomas Beaven in Springfield on September 29, 1894. He then travelled to Rome to study at the College of the Propaganda, earning a Doctor of Divinity degree in 1896.

Following his return to the United States, the diocese assigned Rice to a parish in Portland, Maine. He was then sent to Northern Maine to do missionary work among Native Americans there. Rice's next pastoral assignment was as an assistant pastor at St. Bernard's parish in Fitchburg, Massachusetts. He was then appointed as pastor of a French-Canadian parish in Pittsfield, Massachusetts. Rice also served in parishes in Oxford, Massachusetts, and Whitinsville, Massachusetts. Rice worked as a professor of philosophy at St. John's Seminary in Boston until 1903, when he was tasked with erecting St. Peter's Parish in Northbridge, Massachusetts.

=== Bishop of Burlington ===
On January 8, 1910, Rice was appointed bishop of Burlington by Pope Pius X. He received his episcopal consecration on April 14, 1910, from Bishop Thomas Beaven, with Bishops Matthew Harkins and Louis Walsh serving as co-consecrators, at the Cathedral of the Immaculate Conception in Burlington.

In 1923, Rice laid the cornerstone for a hospital on land in Burlington previously purchased by Bishop Louis de Goesbriand. The hospital was named De Goesbriand Memorial Hospital and placed under the supervision of the Religious Hospitallers of St. Joseph. It is today part of the University of Vermont Medical Center. In 1927, a School of Nursing was opened. During his 28-year-long tenure, Rice opened three high schools and Trinity College for women in Burlington. He was also confronted a case of anti-Catholicism; in November 1925, the Ku Klux Klan burned a cross on the steps of St. Augustine's Church at Montpelier, Vermont.

=== Death ===
Joseph Rice died in Burlington on April 1, 1938, at age 66. He is buried at Resurrection Park in South Burlington, Vermont.

Catholic Church titles
Preceded by John Stephen Michaud	Bishop of Burlington; 1910–1938	Succeeded by Matthew Francis Brady
