= Alexis Boyer House =

Historic house in Massachusetts, United States

- U.S. National Register of Historic Places
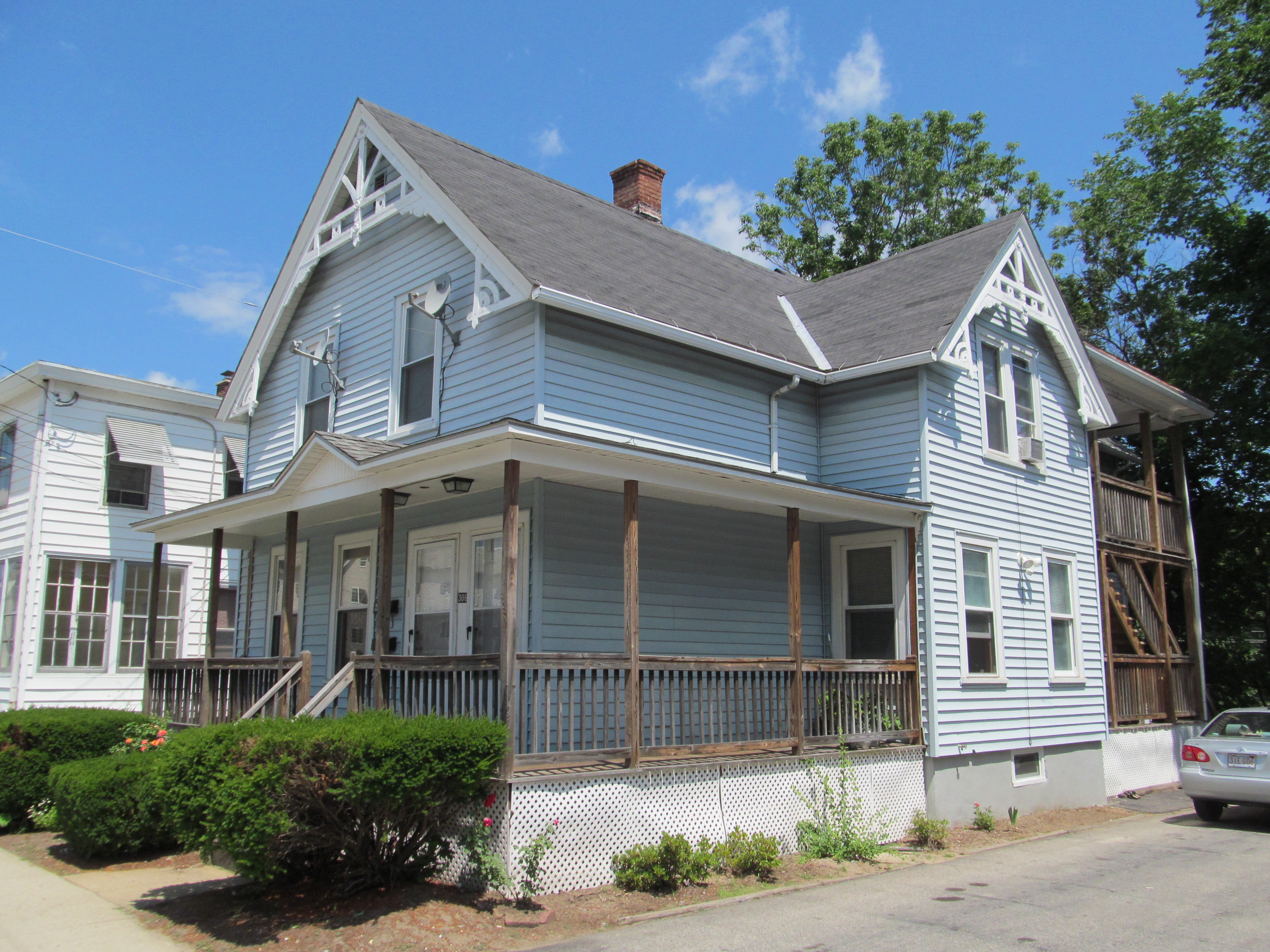
- Alexis Boyer House

- Location within Massachusetts Location within the United States
- Location: 306 Hamilton St., Southbridge, Massachusetts
- Coordinates: 42°4′53″N 72°2′16″W
- Area: less than one acre
- Built: 1888
- Architect: Boyer, A.
- Architectural style: Queen Anne
- MPS: Southbridge MRA
- NRHP reference No.: 89000560
- Added to NRHP: June 22, 1989

The Alexis Boyer House is a historic house at 306 Hamilton Street in Southbridge, Massachusetts. Built in 1888, it is a good local example of Queen Anne/Stick style architecture. It was built for Alexis Boyer, a political leader in the city's sizable French Canadian community. The house was listed on the National Register of Historic Places in 1989.

== Description and history ==
The Alexis Boyer House is located in a residential area near its larger historic mill complexes, on the north side of Hamilton Street opposite its junction with Pine Street. It is a 2 1/2-story wood-frame structure, with a gabled roof and mostly clapboarded exterior. A cross-gabled section projects from the middle of the right side, and there are two gabled wall dormers on the left side. Most of these gables are decorated with elaborate stickwork. A single-story porch extends across the front and around to the right-side projection, with a peaked gable above the front stairs. It also has a feature otherwise unusual for Queen Anne houses, an exterior rear staircase, which is believed to have originated among the French Canadians.

The house was built in 1888 for Alexis Boyer, a builder and political leader of the sizable French Canadian community in Southbridge. The immediate neighborhood had developed as a French Canadian enclave due to the presence of a Catholic church that catered to that group. Boyer is known to have built a significant number of triple decker residences in the city. His political activities included service in the state legislature and on the state Democratic Party organizing committee. Architecturally, the house is distinguished for its relatively rare surviving gable trim.

== See also ==
- National Register of Historic Places listings in Southbridge, Massachusetts
- National Register of Historic Places listings in Worcester County, Massachusetts
