= Baker v. State =

Vermont Supreme Court case

Baker v. State of Vermont
- Court: Vermont Supreme Court
- Full case name: Stan Baker, et al v. State of Vermont, et al
- Decided: December 20, 1999
- Citation: 744 A.2d 864 (Vt. 1999)

Case history
- Prior action: Claim dismissed
- Subsequent action: Creation of Same-sex Civil Unions

Court membership
- Judges sitting: Jeffrey L. Amestoy (Chief Justice), John A. Dooley, James L. Morse, Marilyn S. Skoglund, Denise R. Johnson

Case opinions
- Majority: Amestoy joined by Morse, Skoglund
- Concurrence: Dooley
- Concur/dissent: Johnson

Baker v. Vermont, 744 A.2d 864 (Vt. 1999), was a lawsuit decided by Vermont Supreme Court on December 20, 1999. It was one of the first judicial affirmations of the right of same-sex couples to treatment equivalent to that afforded different-sex couples. The decision held that the state's prohibition on same-sex marriage denied rights granted by the Vermont Constitution. The court ordered the Vermont legislature to either allow same-sex marriages or implement an alternative legal mechanism according similar rights to same-sex couples.

== Background ==
Following their initial success in Hawaii in 1996 that was later undone by a popular referendum in 1998, advocates for same-sex marriage selected Vermont for their lawsuit on the basis of the state's record of establishing rights for gays and lesbians as well as the difficulty of amending its constitution.

Vermont enacted hate crimes legislation in 1990, one of the first states to do so. From the time the legislation that became the Hate Crimes Act was introduced in 1989, it included sexual orientation. Most of the testimony and statistics that supported the legislation related to the gay and lesbian community and one incident of anti-gay violence helped secure its passage. It added sexual orientation to its anti-discrimination statute, the Human Rights Law, in 1992. In 1993, the Vermont Supreme Court ruled unanimously in the case In re B.L.V.B. that a woman could adopt her lesbian partner's natural children. The statute provided that an adoption terminates the rights of natural parents, unless the person adopting is the spouse of the child's natural parent. The Court decided that the statute did not intend to restrict adoption to legal spouses only, that safeguarding the child was its "general intent and spirit", and that adoption by a second woman was therefore permissible. In 1995, in the course of reforming the state's adoption statute, a Senate committee first removed language allowing unmarried couples, whatever their sex, to adopt, but after months of work the legislature passed a version that made same-sex couples eligible to adopt.

== Trial court ==
On July 22, 1997, three same-sex couples, who had been denied marriage licenses in the towns of Milton and Shelburne and the city of South Burlington, sued those jurisdictions and the state. They were Stan Baker and Peter Harrigan, Holly Puterbaugh and Lois Farnham, and Nina Beck and Stacy Jolles. Two of the couples had raised children together. The couples sued their respective localities and the state of Vermont, requesting a declaratory judgment that the denial of licenses violated Vermont's marriage statutes and the state Constitution. The plaintiffs were represented by Mary Bonauto, an attorney with Boston-based Gay & Lesbian Advocates and Defenders, and two Vermont attorneys, Susan Murray and Beth Robinson. (Note: Robinson later chaired Vermont Freedom to Marry and in 2011 was appointed to the Vermont Supreme Court by Governor Peter Shumlin.)

The defendants moved to dismiss the lawsuit on the grounds that no relief could be legally granted for the plaintiffs' grievances. On December 19 at the trial court in Chittenden County, Superior Court Judge Linda Levitt granted the defendants' motion, ruling that the marriage statutes could not be construed to allow same-sex marriages and that the statutes were constitutional because they served the public interest by promoting "the link between procreation and child rearing". She disagreed with the defendants' contention that "history and tradition" justify the state's interest in preserving marriage. The plaintiffs appealed the decision to the Vermont Supreme Court.

On November 3, 1998, voters in Alaska and Hawaii approved referendums in opposition to same-sex marriage. (Note: Hawaii voters approved a constitutional amendment that allowed the legislature to ban same-sex marriages, while Alaskans backed a constitutional amendment that limited marriage to heterosexual couples.) Two weeks later, on the eve of oral arguments in Baker before the Vermont Supreme Court, Tracey Conaty of the National Gay and Lesbian Task Force said "Right now Vermont, in many ways, is our biggest hope". Discussing the interplay between the courts and public opinion, Greg Johnson, a professor at Vermont Law School, said: "The reason we have some hope here in Vermont is not just because the jurisprudence is good but the body politic is markedly different than in Alaska and Hawaii".

== Vermont Supreme Court ==
The Vermont Supreme Court received amicus briefs from the Vermont Human Rights Commission, Lambda Legal Defense and Education Fund, Vermont Coalition for Lesbian and Gay Rights, Parents and Friends of Lesbian and Gay Men, Vermont Organization for Weddings of the Same-Gender, Vermont NOW, Vermont Psychiatric Association, Take It To the People, New Journey, the American Center for Law and Justice, Specialty Research Associates, the Roman Catholic Diocese of Burlington, Agudath Israel of America, the Christian Legal Society, and a number of U.S. states, groups of professors of law, and individuals. It heard oral arguments on November 18, 1998.

=== Oral Argument ===
Attorney Beth Robinson represented the plaintiffs at the State Supreme Court. She argued that the statutes could be read to provide same-sex couples the right to marry. They also argued that in the absence of such an interpretation of the statutes, the Vermont Constitution's Common Benefits Clause (Chapter I, Article 7), which guarantees all citizens equal benefit and protection of the law, guarantees same-sex couples' right to the substantial benefits and protections of marriage. They questioned the lower court's justification for limiting marital status to male-female couples—linking marital status to procreation and child rearing, noting that Vermont law recognized same-sex couples' right to adopt children and to parent children conceived by natural and artificial means. They questioned how the state could explicitly allow same-sex partners to parent, but deny them and their adopted children the benefits and security of marriage. The justices questioned whether the state's position constituted gender discrimination and whether modern science was undermining the idea that only male-female couples could procreate. The state nevertheless maintained that this was a question of social policy within the purview of the legislature in "furthering the link between procreation and child rearing.". When a justice asked if the state saw marriage as a fundamental right, the attorney for the state answered "Yes, but it's a fundamental right between a man and a woman."

== Opinion of the Court ==
On December 20, 1999, the Vermont Supreme Court ruled that the denial of marriage benefits to same-sex partners was a violation of the state constitution. In the majority opinion authored by Chief Justice Jeffrey Amestoy and joined by two other judges, the court held that the state must guarantee the same protections and benefits to same-sex couples that it does to male-female spouses, and added that the legislature should, in a "reasonable period of time", find a way to provide same-sex couples with those benefits. Justices John Dooley and Denise R. Johnson each wrote separate opinions concurring that the exclusion of same-sex couples to the state's marriage rights was unconstitutional, but with different rationales.

=== Majority opinion ===
The majority opinion was authored by Chief Justice Jeffrey Amestoy and joined by justices James Morse and Marilyn Skoglund. In it, the court dismissed the plaintiff's contention that the denial of same-sex unions violated Vermont marriage statutes. The court held that while the statutes did not explicitly limit marriage to male-female pairs, both the common dictionary definition of marriage and the legislative intent when the relevant statutes were enacted in 1945 favored the interpretation of marriage as a union between a man and a woman. The court also interpreted the terms bride and groom as being gender-specific.

With respect to the State Constitution's Common Benefit Clause, the court noted that it was an original component of the 1777 Vermont Constitution, predating the Equal Protection Clause of the Federal Constitution's 14th Amendment by several decades. The Court further noted that Vermont is free to provide rights to its citizens not granted by the U.S. Constitution, and that the application of the Common Benefit Clause has historically been significantly different from the federal courts' application of the Equal Protection Clause. While the federal Equal Protection Clause is typically invoked only under very limited circumstances, the Common Benefit Clause has been read to require that "statutory exclusions from publicly conferred benefits and protections must be 'premised on an appropriate and overriding public interest.'"

The court found that the state's marriage policy did not serve such an "overriding public interest", rejecting the argument that same-sex marriages would do harm by weakening the link between marriage and child rearing and finding no administrative or pragmatic difficulty with extending the rights of marriage to same-sex couples. The court also noted the state's endorsement of parenting by gays and lesbians in a series of actions, including 1996 legislation promoting same-sex adoption. It also dismissed the argument that legal recognition of same-sex marriage would not conform to the practices of other states, pointing out that Vermont already allowed for certain marriage contracts not recognized by other states (including first-cousin marriages), and that such concerns had not prevented the passage of laws allowing same-sex couples to adopt. The court dismissed the defendant's remaining arguments, such as those concerning the "stability" of same-sex couples, as too nebulous or speculative to justify a policy with respect to all same-sex couples and equally applicable to some male-female partnerships.

The court declined to grant the plaintiffs' request for a marriage license, though it allowed that "some future case may attempt to establish that notwithstanding equal benefits and protections under Vermont law—the denial of a marriage license operates per se to deny constitutionally protected rights". Instead, the court directed the State to implement a system to grant same-sex couples statutory rights and privileges equivalent to those enjoyed by male-female couples. This system could be implemented by modifying the marriage statutes to allow for same-sex marriages or by creating a parallel status under another name.

=== Concurrences and dissent ===
Justice John Dooley

Justice John Dooley wrote a concurrence in which he agreed with the majority opinion in that the denial of marriage benefits to same-sex couples violated the State's Common Benefits Clause, he did not agree with the majority's reliance on federal precedent, which does not hold binding on the Vermont state courts. He accused the majority on relying on the Supreme Court case Bowers v. Hardwick, which held that sodomy laws can be constitutionally criminalized, and not applying a suspect classification to sexual orientation in accordance to Vermont court jurisprudence developments.

Justice Denise R. Johnson

Justice Denise R. Johnson concurred with the majority's holding that the marriage statutes defining marriage between opposite couples violated the state constitution, but dissented from the remedy. Johnson wrote that she believed that the state was required to issue marriage licenses to same-sex couples, not just offer the same benefits by a different name. She argued the marriage statutes were a violation of sex classification. She wrote, "I would grant the requested relief and enjoin defendants from denying plaintiffs a marriage license based solely on the sex of the applicants."

== Later developments ==
In 2000, the Legislature responded to the Baker decision by instituting civil unions for same-sex couples after an acrimonious and deeply polarizing debate. The legislation, which took effect on July 1, also defined marriage as the union of a man and a woman, an explicit statement previously not found in Vermont's marriage licensing statute. In response to the court's decision in Baker and the legislature's enactment of civil unions, opponents of the legal recognition of same-sex unions formed an opposition organization called Take Back Vermont.

In the elections that fall, six incumbent legislators who supported civil unions lost in the September primaries, five Republicans and one Democrat. In November another 11 civil union supporters lost their seats in the legislature. Exit polls showed voters were evenly split on the question of civil unions.

When GLAD filed a lawsuit seeking same-sex marriage rights in Massachusetts, Bonauto tried to avoid winning a decision like Baker by emphasizing the status of marriage rather than its particular legal benefits and obligations. She said: "We spent more time in Massachusetts talking about how marriage is a basic civil and human right. It cannot be splintered into state and federal protections. We talked about what marriage is in our culture."

New Jersey's highest court ruled unanimously in Lewis v. Harris on October 25, 2006, that excluding same-sex couples from marriage violated the state constitution's guarantee of equal protection. When the justices determined 4 to 3 that the appropriate remedy should be left to the legislature because "such change must come from the crucible of the democratic process", the New York Times said New Jersey "could be considered the new Vermont".

Vermont legalized same-sex marriage effective September 1, 2009. Civil unions entered into prior to September 1 continued to be recognized as civil unions unless the couple married.

== See also ==
- LGBT rights in Vermont
- Same-sex marriage in Vermont
- The State of Marriage, a 2015 documentary film on same-sex marriage that focuses in part on the lawsuit
