= Capts. Louis and Philomene Daniels House =

Historic house in Vermont, United States

- U.S. National Register of Historic Places
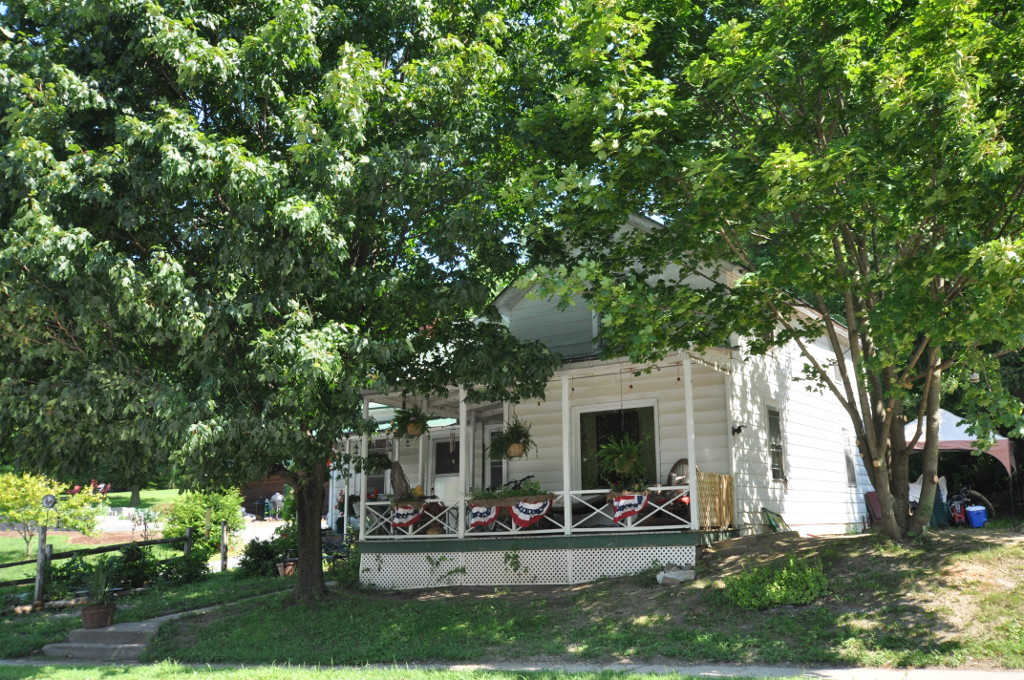

- Location within Vermont Location within the United States
- Location: 50 Macdonough Dr., Vergennes, Vermont
- Coordinates: 44°10′12″N 73°15′28″W
- Area: 0.3 acres (0.12 ha)
- Built: 1887
- NRHP reference No.: 01000733
- Added to NRHP: July 11, 2001

The Capts. Louis and Philomene Daniels House is a historic house at 50 Macdonough Drive in Vergennes, Vermont. Built in 1868, this vernacular waterfront house was home to Philomene Daniels, believed to be the first woman to be given a steamship captain's license. She, her husband Louis, and their two sons operated the Daniels Boat Line, providing freight and passenger service between Vergennes and Westport, New York. Their house was listed on the National Register of Historic Places in 2001.

== Description and history ==
The Daniels House stands northwest of downtown Vergennes, on the north side of Macdonough Drive opposite Macdonough Park and the Vergennes city dock. The house is a modest vernacular 1 1/2-story wood-frame structure. It is L-shaped, with a front-facing gabled main block, an ell extending to the west, and a shed-roof section extending across the rear. A shed-roof porch extends across the front, and there are entrances in both the front of the ell and the side of the main block. The interior retains original flooring and trim elements.

Philomene Daniels was a native of Quebec whose family moved to Vergennes in the 1850s. In 1862 she married Louis Daniels, a native of Panton who was also of French-Canadian extraction. In 1869 he began working aboard the Water Lily, a small steamboat which he purchased in 1880. By 1877 he had acquired both pilot and engineering licenses for operating the ship, which carried freight and passengers down Otter Creek to Lake Champlain and across to Westport, New York. The couple's two sons began assisting their father in the operation of the service, and Philomene also joined the family business. Seeking to become "as good a pilot as any man", she secured a pilot's license in 1887, a feat which garnered international headlines. The family eventually acquired or built three more steamships, which plied the lake until 1916, when other forms of transport rendered it unprofitable.

== See also ==
- National Register of Historic Places listings in Addison County, Vermont
