= List of first minority male lawyers and judges in Vermont =

This is a list of the first minority male lawyer(s) and judge(s) in Vermont. It includes the year in which the men were admitted to practice law (in parentheses). Also included are those who achieved other distinctions, such becoming the first in their state to graduate from law school or become a political figure.

== Firsts in Vermont's history ==
=== Lawyers ===
- First Jewish American male: Joshua Montefiore (1869)
- First Italian American male: Joseph J. Frattini (1917)
- First African American male to appear before a Vermont court: Henry E. Quarles, Sr. (1920)
- First African American male: Samuel Johnson (c. 1980s)

=== State judge ===
- First Jewish American male: Myron Samuelson in 1941

== See also ==
- List of first minority male lawyers and judges in the United States

== Other topics of interest ==
- List of first women lawyers and judges in the United States
- List of first women lawyers and judges in Vermont
