= Beth Robinson =

American judge (born 1965)

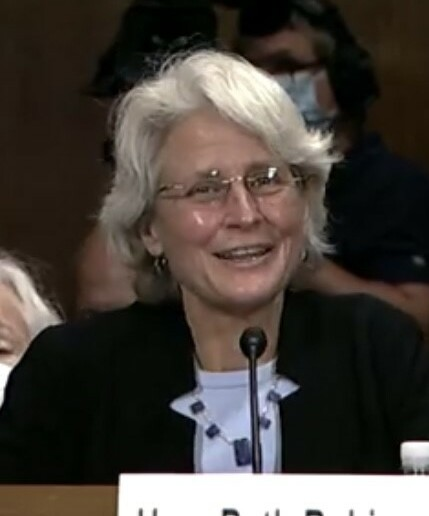

Judge of the United States Court of Appeals for the Second Circuit
- Incumbent
- Assumed office November 5, 2021
- Appointed by: Joe Biden
- Preceded by: Peter W. Hall

Associate Justice of the Vermont Supreme Court
- In office November 28, 2011 – November 5, 2021
- Appointed by: Peter Shumlin
- Preceded by: Denise R. Johnson
- Succeeded by: Nancy Waples

Personal details
- Born: 1965 (age 60–61) Karachi, Pakistan
- Education: Dartmouth College (BA); University of Chicago (JD)

Beth Robinson (born 1965) is an American lawyer and judge from Vermont. She is a United States circuit judge of the United States Court of Appeals for the Second Circuit and is the first openly lesbian judge to serve on any federal court of appeals. Robinson served as an associate justice of the Vermont Supreme Court from 2011 to 2021.

Robinson was born in Karachi, Pakistan, and she was raised and educated in Indiana. She graduated from Dartmouth College (Bachelor of Arts, 1986) and the University of Chicago Law School (Juris Doctor, 1989). After serving as a law clerk for a federal judge, Robinson joined Vermont's Langrock, Sperry & Wool law firm, where she was active on cases related to workers' compensation, personal injury, and constitutional law. Robinson became active in the movement for expanded rights for gays and lesbians, and served as co-counsel in the case of Baker v. State, the 1999 decision that led to Vermont passing the first civil unions law. As chair of the Vermont Freedom to Marry organization, Robinson was a high-profile supporter of same-sex marriage, and worked with leaders of the Vermont General Assembly on passage of the 2009 Marriage Equality Act.

After working on Peter Shumlin's successful campaign for governor in 2010, Robinson joined his staff as legal counsel, a position which included drafting and analyzing proposed legislation and regulations, making recommendations on whether to approve requests for pardons, and ensuring compliance with ethics rules. In 2011, Shumlin appointed Robinson as an associate justice of the Vermont Supreme Court. She served until 2021, when she resigned after having been confirmed as a judge on the United States Court of Appeals for the Second Circuit.

== Early life and education ==
Robinson was born in Karachi, Pakistan, in 1965, the daughter of Dr. Robert D. Robinson Jr. and Cynthia (Pittenger) Robinson. Robinson's father worked in Pakistan at the time of her birth, and she was raised in Indiana. In 1982, she graduated from Brebeuf Jesuit Preparatory School in Indianapolis. While at Brebeuf, Robinson was a member of the basketball and tennis teams, the French club, and the orchestra. She won honors in mathematics contests and won the Optimist's Club's oratorical contest. At graduation, Robinson was named a National Merit Scholar.

In 1986, Robinson received her Bachelor of Arts degree in philosophy and government from Dartmouth College, and she graduated summa cum laude and Phi Beta Kappa. During 1985, she spent a semester abroad as a student at the University of Edinburgh.

Robinson graduated from the University of Chicago Law School with a Juris Doctor in 1989, and was admitted to the Order of the Coif. She was a recipient of the Mechem Prize, a full merit scholarship. While in law school, Robinson was a member of the University of Chicago Law Review and then served as an associate editor.

== Legal career ==
After graduating from law school, Robinson was a law clerk for Judge David B. Sentelle of the United States Court of Appeals for the District of Columbia Circuit from 1989 to 1990. She was an associate attorney at Skadden, Arps, Slate, Meagher & Flom of Washington, D.C. from 1990 to 1991 and self employed as an attorney under contract by Hirschkop & Associates of Alexandria, Virginia from 1992 to 1993. Robinson was employed for 18 years at Langrock, Sperry & Wool, a law firm with offices in Burlington and Middlebury. While there, she worked on issues of workers' compensation, personal injury, constitutional law and, most prominently, gay and lesbian rights.

Robinson served as co-counsel in the case of Baker v. State, the landmark 1999 decision that led to Vermont becoming the first state to enact civil unions. She was subsequently involved in the 2009 legislative battle to enact same-sex marriage, chairing the Vermont Freedom to Marry advocacy organization and working closely with Peter Shumlin, a prominent supporter of same-sex marriage, who was then President pro tempore of the Vermont Senate.

In addition to practicing law, Robinson has also taught at the college level. She was a senior lecturer at Dartmouth College during the 2006 summer term and again during the 2009 spring term. Robinson served as a justice of the peace for the town of Ferrisburgh from 2003 to 2011. In 2008, she was a delegate to the Democratic National Convention and pledged to support Hillary Clinton.

From 1999 to 2010, Robinson served on the Vermont Board of Bar Examiners. She was an associate member from 1999 to 2003, and an examiner from 2003 to 2009. From 2009 to 2010 she served as the board's vice chair, and she served as chair in 2010. Robinson was active in Shumlin's successful 2010 gubernatorial campaign, then joined his administration as his general counsel.

== Judicial career ==
=== Vermont Supreme Court ===
On October 18, 2011, Shumlin announced he was appointing Robinson to the Associate Justice's seat on the Vermont Supreme Court that had been vacated by Denise R. Johnson's retirement in August 2011. Since the Senate was not in session at the time, Robinson's appointment was considered interim until the Senate convened and acted upon her nomination. She was sworn in as an interim member of the court on November 28, 2011. The Senate voted on her nomination on February 7, 2012, and approved it by a 26–0 vote. Four of the thirty senators were absent for the vote: all four announced their support for Robinson's nomination the following day. Her service terminated when she resigned after being confirmed as a judge on the United States Court of Appeals for the Second Circuit.

=== Federal judicial service ===
On August 5, 2021, President Joe Biden nominated Robinson to serve as a United States circuit judge for the United States Court of Appeals for the Second Circuit. President Biden nominated Robinson to the seat vacated by Judge Peter W. Hall, who assumed senior status on March 4, 2021. On September 14, 2021, a hearing on her nomination was held before the Senate Judiciary Committee. During Robinson's confirmation hearing, she faced questioning from Republican Senators over her views on religious freedom. As a lawyer in private practice, she had represented a woman who sued a local print shop for refusing to print cards for an organization called Vermont Catholics for Choice. The owners of the print shop, who were Catholic, said they did not believe Catholics could support abortion. On October 21, 2021, her nomination was reported out of committee by a 10–9 vote. On October 25, 2021, Majority Leader Chuck Schumer filed cloture on her nomination. On October 28, 2021, the United States Senate invoked cloture on her nomination by a 51–36 vote. On November 1, 2021, her nomination was confirmed by a 51–45 vote. She received her judicial commission on November 5, 2021. She is the first openly gay woman to serve on any federal circuit court.

== Personal life ==
=== Family ===
Robinson is a resident of Vermont. She and her wife Kym Boyman entered into a civil union in 2001 and got married in 2010.

=== Honors and awards ===
Robinson is the recipient of the following awards:

- Vermonter of the Year for 2009, The Burlington Free Press
- Doctor of Laws (LL.D.), Middlebury College, 2010
- Doctor of Humane Letters (DHL), Johnson State College, 2012
- LL.D., Burlington College, 2012
- LL.D., Vermont Law School, 2014

== See also ==
- List of LGBT state supreme court justices in the United States
- List of LGBT jurists in the United States

Legal offices
Preceded by Denise R. Johnson	Associate Justice of the Vermont Supreme Court; 2011–2021	Succeeded by Nancy Waples
Preceded by Peter W. Hall	Judge of the United States Court of Appeals for the Second Circuit; 2021–present	Incumbent
