= Louis P. Peck =

American judge (1918–2008)

Louis Provost Peck (December 24, 1918 – May 8, 2008) was a Vermont attorney and public official. He is notable for his service as an associate justice of the Vermont Supreme Court from 1981 to 1990.

== Early life ==
Louis Provost Peck was born in Montpelier, Vermont on December 24, 1918, the son of Mary Alice Provost (1886-1956) and W. Nelson Peck (1884-1958). His father owned and operated the Peck Brothers Hardware Store, and Louis Peck had a twin brother, John W. Peck.

Louis Peck graduated from Montpelier's St. Michael’s High School in 1937. He intended to begin studies at the University of Notre Dame, but had to delay starting college because he contracted polio. After his recovery, he began attendance at Notre Dame, but left school to serve in the military during World War II.

== Military service ==
Peck enlisted in the United States Army in 1941. He completed officer training, and was qualified in the field artillery branch. He then volunteered for paratrooper training, and was assigned to the 17th Airborne Division. Peck served in combat in France, Belgium, and Luxembourg, and during March 1945's Operation Varsity, he was wounded when his glider came under enemy fire.

Unable to move because his legs had been shattered by shrapnel and bullets, Peck was injured again when another glider crashed into him as it was landing. He spent more than two years recuperating in hospitals overseas and in the United States, and was discharged as a captain in 1947.

Peck's awards included the Purple Heart.

== Post-war ==
After his recuperation, Peck returned to the University of Notre Dame; he received his B.A. degree in 1950, and his LL.B. in 1951. (His LL.B. was later amended to J.D.) Peck had received his varsity letter in fencing before the war. Before leaving college for the army, he had been elected captain of the 1942 team. When he returned to Notre Dame after the war, he served as the coach of the freshman fencing team.

Peck was admitted to the bar in 1951, and practiced in Montpelier. A Republican, in 1952 he served as chairman of the organizing committee for Montpelier's Eisenhower for President organization. He served as city grand juror (prosecutor in Montpelier's municipal court) from 1952 to 1957, and was also a member of the city's board of listers. During the 1950s, he served as chairman of the Washington County Republican committee, and vice chairman of Montpelier's Republican party.

He served as deputy state's attorney of Washington County; in late 1954 and early 1955, he served as acting state's attorney while the incumbent was traveling out of state. A civic activist, Peck's volunteer efforts included a term as president of Montpelier's chamber of commerce.

In 1956, he was an unsuccessful candidate for the Republican nomination for the Vermont House of Representatives; during the 1957 session of the Vermont General Assembly, he was a draftsman on the legislature's staff.

Later in 1957, Peck joined the office of the Vermont Attorney General as the attorney general's chief legal assistant, and he served until 1965. Among his major responsibilities in this position was serving as chief counsel for the Vermont Agency of Transportation, ensuring that the planning and construction of Interstate Highways 89 and 91 complied with both state and federal laws.

== Continued career ==
In 1965, Attorney General John P. Connarn appointed Peck as his deputy. Peck served as deputy attorney general until January 1967, and then returned to his post as chief legal assistant and counsel for the Vermont Agency of Transportation. He was later appointed as assistant attorney general for governmental affairs, and then chief assistant attorney general in charge of advisory opinions and appeals. From 1969 to 1981, Peck was a member of the Vermont National Bank board of directors.

== Judicial career ==
In September 1981, Governor Richard A. Snelling appointed Peck as an associate justice of the Vermont Supreme Court, filling the vacancy created by the retirement of Robert W. Larrow. Peck's appointment marked a break with Vermont's longstanding tradition of appointing judges of the Vermont Superior Court to the Supreme Court. (Larrow's 1974 appointment was also a break with tradition; previously the chief judge of the superior court was chosen by seniority, and the chief judge was appointed to the Supreme Court when a vacancy occurred. Larrow was serving on the Superior Court at the time of his appointment to the Supreme Court, but was not the chief judge.)

Peck's tenure was best known for his challenge to Vermont's mandatory retirement law for judges. The state constitution required judges to retire at age 70; when Peck refused to retire after turning 70, the state sued to remove him. Peck argued that federal laws prohibiting age discrimination should take precedence over the state constitution. His challenge was heard by the United States Court of Appeals for the Second Circuit, which agreed in July 1989 that he could not be compelled to retire. Having made his legal point and established a precedent for future age discrimination claims, Peck retired in 1990, and was replaced by Denise R. Johnson.

== Playwright and actor ==
Peck was a longtime member of the Montpelier Theatre Guild and Actor’s Equity, and authored and directed numerous plays. He also appeared in productions at The Stowe Playhouse and Goddard College. During his work in local and regional theater, Peck acted in more than a hundred plays.

== Retirement and death ==
In retirement, Peck continued to reside in Montpelier. He died at the Woodridge Nursing Home in Berlin, Vermont on May 8, 2008.

== Family ==
In 1952, Peck married Iride Joan Falacci (1924-2003) of Montpelier. They were the parents of daughters Katherine, Barbara and Nancy.

== Sources ==
=== Newspapers ===
- "Named Fencing Captain". Indianapolis Star. Indianapolis, IN. Associated Press. April 4, 1941 – via Newspapers.com.
- "Louis P. Peck graduated Sunday from Notre Dame University". Burlington Free Press. Burlington, VT. June 6, 1950 – via Newspapers.com.
- "Guy Page, Jr., Sister, Pass Bar Exams". Burlington Free Press. Burlington, VT. Morning Press Bureau. September 29, 1951 – via Newspapers.com.
- "Eisenhower Club Forming in Capital". Burlington Free Press. Burlington, VT. January 24, 1952 – via Newspapers.com.
- "Henry Whitney New Head of Montpelier Aldermanic Board". Burlington Free Press. Burlington, VT. March 14, 1952 – via Newspapers.com.
- "Louis B. Peck (sic), Montpelier Atty., Weds Miss Falacci". Burlington Free Press. Burlington, VT. May 5, 1952 – via Newspapers.com.
- "Paterson Heads GOP". Burlington Free Press. Burlington, VT. May 3, 1954 – via Newspapers.com.
- "Dead Man's Pals Charged With Jacking Deer". Burlington Free Press. Burlington, VT. November 22, 1954 – via Newspapers.com.
- "Louis P. Peck New Head of Montpelier C of C". Burlington Free Press. Burlington, VT. January 15, 1955 – via Newspapers.com.
- "Moretown Man, 36 Collapses and Dies at Kitchen Table". Burlington Free Press. Burlington, VT. March 9, 1955 – via Newspapers.com.
- "Montpelier City Council Names Louis Peck to Board of Listers". Burlington Free Press. Burlington, VT. March 26, 1955 – via Newspapers.com.
- "Washington Cty. Republicans Give $2200 to Raise". Burlington Free Press. Burlington, VT. October 18, 1955 – via Newspapers.com.
- "Deaths and Funerals: Mrs. W. Nelson Peck". Burlington Free Press. Burlington, VT. April 13, 1956 – via Newspapers.com.
- "Senator Mildred Hayden Loses Out in Washington County Senate Race". Burlington Free Press. Burlington, VT. September 12, 1956 – via Newspapers.com.
- "Appointed Draftsman". Burlington Free Press. Burlington, VT. December 18, 1956 – via Newspapers.com.
- "L. P. Peck, Montpelier, is Asst. Atty. General". Burlington Free Press. Burlington, VT. Morning Press Bureau. August 20, 1957 – via Newspapers.com.
- "W. Edson McKee Named Montpelier City Grand Juror". Burlington Free Press. Burlington, VT. August 29, 1957 – via Newspapers.com.
- "W. Nelson Peck, Retired Capital Merchant, Dies". Burlington Free Press. Burlington, VT. January 17, 1958 – via Newspapers.com.
- "Louis P. Peck Named Deputy Attorney General". Burlington Free Press. Burlington, VT. Morning Press Bureau. December 9, 1965 – via Newspapers.com.
- "Peck Resigns as Deputy Atty. General". Burlington Free Press. Burlington, VT. January 5, 1967 – via Newspapers.com.
- Swayze, Joe (February 2, 1972). "Town Charter Changes are Now in Effect". Bennington Banner. Bennington, VT – via Newspapers.com.
- Carlson, Stephen (March 7, 1974). "Legislature Names Robert W. Larrow to Supreme Court". Burlington Free Press. Burlington, VT. Free Press Capital Bureau – via Newspapers.com.
- Graff, Christopher (September 10, 1981). "Governor Taps Peck for Court". Burlington Free Press. Burlington, VT. Associated Press – via Newspapers.com.
- "Taking Note: Vermont National Bank". Burlington Free Press. Burlington, VT. December 13, 1981 – via Newspapers.com.
- Graff, Christopher (July 21, 1989). "Justice Peck Can Remain on the Bench". Burlington Free Press. Burlington, VT. Associated Press – via Newspapers.com.
- Zentz, Andrea (December 4, 1990). "First Female Judge Joins Vt. High Court". Burlington Free Press. Burlington, VT. Free Press Capital Bureau – via Newspapers.com.
- "Obituary, Louis P. Peck". Burlington Free Press. Burlington, VT. May 13, 2008 – via Newspapers.com.

=== Books ===
- Douglas, James H. (1981). Vermont Legislative Directory (1981). Montpelier, VT: Vermont Secretary of State.
- Cooley, Harry H. (1967). Vermont Legislative Directory (1967). Montpelier, VT: Vermont Secretary of State.

=== Internet ===
- "Purple Heat Medal, Louis Peck". Freedomandunity.org/. Montpelier, VT: Vermont Historical Society. 1999.

Political offices
Preceded by Robert W. Larrow	Justice of the Vermont Supreme Court; 1981–1990	Succeeded by Denise R. Johnson
