= Denise R. Johnson =

American judge

Associate Justice of the Vermont Supreme Court
- In office December 3, 1990 – August 31, 2011
- Appointed by: Madeleine Kunin
- Preceded by: Louis P. Peck
- Succeeded by: Beth Robinson

Personal details
- Born: July 13, 1947 (age 79) Wyandotte, Michigan
- Education: Wayne State University, University of Connecticut School of Law (J.D.), University of Virginia School of Law (LL.M.)

Denise Reinka Johnson (born July 13, 1947) is a Vermont attorney and judge. She was an associate justice of the Vermont Supreme Court from 1990 to 2011, and was the first woman to serve on this court. One of Johnson's most significant moments was her opinion in Baker v. Vermont in which a majority of the Supreme Court of Vermont ruled the state must establish civil unions for same sex couples. Johnson dissented, arguing that the court should have granted the plaintiffs marriage licenses instead.

== Biography ==
Denise Reinka Johnson was born in Wyandotte, Michigan on July 13, 1947, the daughter of William and Irene Reinka. She graduated from Wyandotte’s Theodore Roosevelt High School in 1965, and received a Bachelor of Arts degree in English from Wayne State University in 1969. She received a Juris Doctor degree from the University of Connecticut School of Law in 1974 and was admitted to the bar in Connecticut.

From 1974 to 1978 Johnson practiced in New Haven, Connecticut with the New Haven Legal Assistance Association. In 1978 she moved to Vermont and began a teaching position at Vermont Law School.

In 1980 Johnson became a Vermont Assistant Attorney General, and she served as the Chief of the Civil Rights Division. She was Chief of the Attorney General’s Public Protection Division from 1982 to 1988. Johnson moved to private practice in 1988, and from 1988 to 1990 was the first Chairperson of the Vermont Human Rights Commission.

In 1990 Johnson was appointed an associate justice of the Vermont Supreme Court by Governor Madeleine Kunin, succeeding Louis P. Peck. She was the first woman to serve on the court, and she served until retiring in 2011. In 1995 she received a LL.M. degree in Law and its Administration from the University of Virginia School of Law.

While serving on the state Supreme Court, Johnson was involved in several notable decisions. She agreed with the majority in 1999’s Baker v. Vermont, which established that denying marriage rights to same-sex couples was discriminatory, and directed the Vermont General Assembly to provide a solution, except that she dissented as to the remedy, preferring marriage licenses issue. This decision led to Vermont’s 2000 civil unions law, the first in the nation to allow same-sex couples to enter into partnerships similar to marriage. Johnson had opposed the portion of the court’s decision directing the legislature to create a solution, unsuccessfully arguing that the court had its own duty to remedy constitutional violations.

Johnson resides in Middlesex, Vermont and has been involved in several international legal initiatives and programs, including teaching advanced seminars and lecturing at universities in Italy, a conference on judicial independence in Belarus, and a judicial reform program in Armenia.

== See also ==
- List of female state supreme court justices
