= Nancy Waples =

American judge (born 1960)

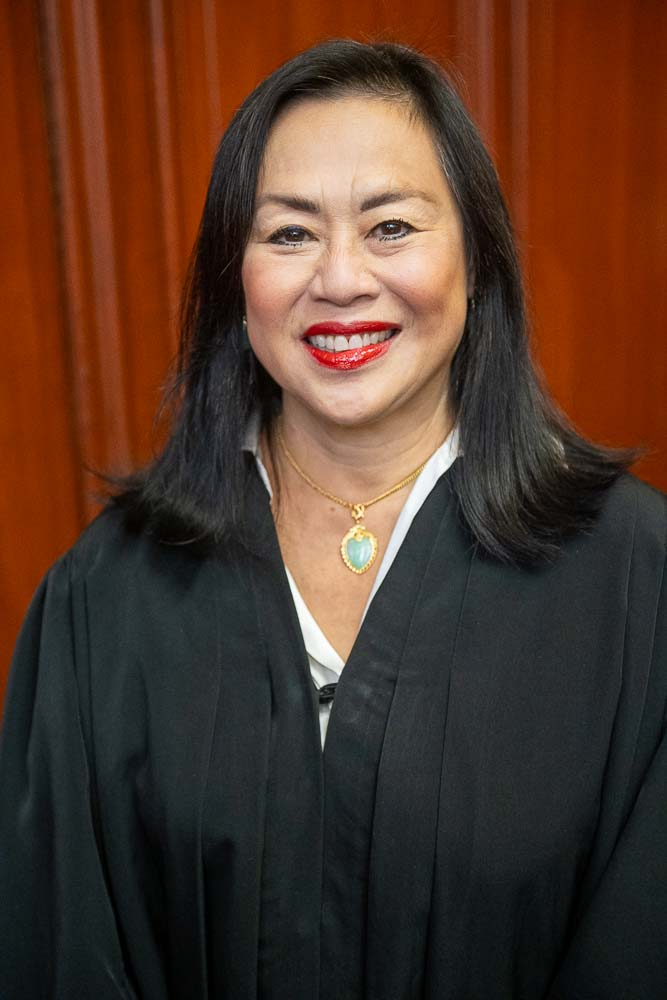

Associate Justice of the Vermont Supreme Court
- Incumbent
- Assumed office April 15, 2022
- Appointed by: Phil Scott
- Preceded by: Beth Robinson

Personal details
- Born: Nancy Jear; October 7, 1960 (age 66) Toronto, Canada
- Spouse: Gregory Waples
- Children: 2
- Education: College of William and Mary (BA); St. John's University (JD)

Nancy Jear Waples (born October 7, 1960) is an American lawyer who has served as an associate justice of the Vermont Supreme Court since 2022.

== Early life and education ==
Waples is the daughter of Chinese immigrants So Kam "Susie" Jear and Yee Roy Jear; she was born in Toronto, Canada and became a U.S. citizen in 1977. She graduated with a Bachelor of Arts from the College of William & Mary in 1982, and she earned a Juris Doctor from St. John's University School of Law in 1987.

== Legal career ==
Waples started her legal career serving as a prosecutor in the Manhattan District Attorney's office, working in the appeals bureau and trial division under well-known District Attorney Robert Morgenthau. She later served as an Assistant United States Attorney in the U.S. Attorney's office in the District of Vermont, where she served in the criminal division. Prior to her appointment as a judge she worked as a lawyer with the law firm Hoff Curtis where she focused on criminal defense.

== Vermont judicial service ==
=== Superior court ===
On December 29, 2014, Governor Peter Shumlin appointed Waples to the Vermont Superior Court to fill the vacancy left by the resignation of judge Geoffrey W. Crawford, who was appointed to the Vermont Supreme Court.

=== Supreme Court ===
On February 25, 2022, Governor Phil Scott announced the appointment of Waples as an associate justice of the Vermont Supreme Court, filling the seat vacated by the resignation of Justice Beth Robinson on November 5, 2021, after Robinson was appointed to the United States Court of Appeals for the Second Circuit. Waples is the first woman of color to serve on the Vermont Supreme Court.

The Vermont Senate confirmed Waples' appointment on March 25, 2022. She was sworn into office on April 15, 2022.

== Family ==
Waples is married to attorney Gregory L. Waples. They are the parents of two sons, both of whom practice as attorneys in New York City.

Legal offices
| Preceded by Beth Robinson | Associate Justice of the Vermont Supreme Court; 2022–present | Incumbent |
