= New Haven Legal Assistance Association =

New Haven Legal Assistance Association, Inc. (LAA) is a nonprofit organization incorporated with funding from the Ford Foundation on April 7, 1964, to "secure justice for and to protect the rights of those residents of New Haven County unable to engage legal counsel." LAA provides free legal services in the fields of child and family law, benefits, employment, health, elder, disabilities, consumer, housing, and civil rights to eligible individuals and families in the greater New Haven area. It maintains partnerships with Yale and Quinnipiac Law Schools.

== History ==
In 1964, the year of the LAA's founding, the American Bar Foundation estimated that some 1,400,000 indigents were tried each year without lawyers in the United States. Seeking a remedy, the government and private charitable organizations began to finance “neighborhood law offices” to accommodate the vast number of individuals requiring legal assistance.

The LAA, financed by the Ford Foundation in 1964, was one of the first legal services programs to be established. On May 1, 1964, it opened its first office. At the ceremony, Supreme Court Justice Arthur Goldberg lauded the opening as “the start of a new process – a process which will expand the rule of law to all segments of the population.” In 1965, when the federal government began funding legal services through the Office of Economic Opportunity, LAA was used as a model for more than 300 programs that were opened around the country.

Throughout the 1960s, the LAA continued to expand in an effort to meet the overwhelming demand for its services. LAA added attorneys (reaching a high of 30 lawyers) and opened additional neighborhood offices (for a total of seven). However, in the early 1970s, large government funding cuts forced the LAA to reduce its staff and number of neighborhood offices. Cuts continued in the early 1980s under the Reagan administration.

The mission of New Haven Legal Assistance Association, Inc. is to provide high-quality legal services to individuals and groups unable to obtain legal services because of limited income, age, disability, discrimination and other barriers.

In 1983, the LAA moved into its current offices at Court and State Streets in New Haven.

== Notable court cases ==
1967

- Alvarado v. Dunn
- State v. Hudson

1969

- Solman v. Shapiro

1971

- Boddie v. Connecticut : In 1971, the LAA argued the case of Boddie v. Connecticut before the United States Supreme Court.
- Gonzalez v. Harder
- Wallace v. Johnson
- Campagnuolo v. Harder
- Rivera v. Dunn

1972

- Lynch v. Household Finance Corporation
- Marotti v. White
- Barber v. White
- Porta v. White
- Givens v. W.T. Grant Co.
- O’Brien v. Trevethen

1973

- In re Kokoszka
- Connecticut Union of Welfare Employees, et al. v. White

1974

- Ives v. W.T. Grant Co.
- Burrell v. Norton

1975

- New Haven Tenants Representative Council v. New Haven Housing Authority
- U.S. v. Dixwell Housing Corporation

1976

- Foskey v. Hills
- Morales v. Hills
- Sanchez v. Maher
- Sockwell v. Maloney

1978

- Davis v. Village Park II Realty Co.

1980

- Morales v. Lukas
- Martinez v. Maher

1981

- City of New Haven v. Gonzalez
- Rudd v. Holiday of Bridgeport, Inc.
- Connelly v. New Haven Housing Authority

1982

- Community Labor Alliance v. Employment Security Board of Review
- R.M. v. New Haven Board of Education

1983

- Jones v. Maher
- Nelson v. Regan
- McNamara v. Peraro
- Mutts v. Dale Funding Corp.

1984

- Hoskie v. New Haven Housing Authority
- Dukes v. Durante

1986

- Staffier v. Kastens
- Grant v. Harris

1987

- White v. Heintz
- Nelson v. Heintz
- Jones v. Heintz

1988

- Stevenson v. Ansonia Housing Authority
- Hoyeson v. Prete
- Brookshire v. J-Mac Realty
- Dow v. Green

1989

- Harrison v. Town of Old Saybrook
- Hilton v. City of New Haven
- Beasley v. Harris
- Welfare v. Ginsberg

1990

- Connelly v. Housing Authority of the City of New Haven

1992

- In re Baby Girl B.
- Mercado v. Commissioner of Income Maintenance

1995

- Hilton v. City of New Haven
- Christian Community Action v. Cisneros
- Ward v. Thomas
- Nelson v. Commissioner, Department of Social Services
- State v. Colton

1996

- Grillo v. Thomas
- Bristol Savings Bank v. Savinelli, et al.
- Dime Savings Bank v. Buber
- State v. Person

1997

- Kostok v. Giardi
- Ladd v. Thomas

1998

- NAACP, et al. v. Milford Housing Authority, et al.
- Frank v. Thomas

1999

- Desario v. Thomas

2001

- Hargrove v. Town of North Haven

2003

- Tappin v. Homecomings Financial Network, Inc.
- Pragano v. Wilson-Coker
- Rabin v. Wilson-Coker
- Edgewood Village Association v. Housing Authority of the City of New Haven
- Karen L. v. Health Net of the Northeast, Inc., et al.

2004

- State v. Peeler

2006

- State v. Soldi
- Health Net of Connecticut v. Freedom of Information Commission

2007

- Raymond v, Rowland, et al.
- McKesson Health Solutions v. Starkowski

2008

- Housing Authority of the City of New Haven v. Goodwin

2009

- State v. Connor
- State v. Terwilliger
- State v. Calabrese
- Urena v. DeBenedetto

2011

- State v. Bryan
- In Re Lukas K
- Valley Housing, et al. v. City of Derby
- Dixon v. Zabka
- Wilkins v. Housing Authority of the City of New Haven
