= Jessie Bigwood =

American lawyer

- Born: 1874; Plattsburgh, New York
- Died: September 23, 1953 (aged 78–79); Toronto, Canada
- Occupation: Lawyer
- Parent(s): Frank Lafountain and Helen Payette

Jessie Lafountain Bigwood (1874 – September 23, 1953) was Vermont's first female lawyer.

She was born in 1874 to Frank Lafountain and Helen Payette in Plattsburgh, New York. At the age of sixteen, she graduated early from high school and thereafter attended the Burlington Business School to study bookkeeping and stenography. She served as a government reporter at Fort Ethan Allen. In 1898, she married Frederick H. Bigwood and began working for V.A. Bullard, Esq. Bigwood took a law course at Boston University in 1900, and by 1902, became the first female lawyer in Vermont after successfully completing her oral examination. Bigwood died on September 23, 1953, in Toronto, Canada. During the final months of her life, a widowed Bigwood supplemented her pension by working as a nurse's aide.

== See also ==
- List of first women lawyers and judges in Vermont
