= Philomène Daniels =

Philomène Austin "Captain Phil" Daniels (September 14, 1843 – October 29, 1929) was a Canadian-born steamboat captain in Vermont. She was the first American woman to be licensed as a pilot and master for steamboat navigation.

Of Basque descent, she was born Philomène Ostiguy dit Domingue in Saint-Mathias, Canada East. She moved to Vergennes with her family during the 1850s. In 1862, she married Louis Daniels, Jr., who was also of French-Canadian descent. Daniels and her husband owned and operated the Daniels Boat Line on Lake Champlain and Otter Creek. They started with one vessel, the Water Lily, and eventually expanded their operation to four vessels. Daniels was licensed in April 1877 and began working as a steamboat pilot. After her husband died in 1903, she continued to operate the business until she married Charles E. M. Caisse, a Canadian-born Vermont blacksmith. Around that time, she turned the boat line, which continued to operate until 1916, over to her son Mitchell and daughter-in-law Helen Lavigne.

In 1883, Daniels reported a sighting of a floating object thought to be Champ, a lake monster supposedly resident in Lake Champlain. According to Daniels, the object passed underneath the boat, resurfaced and subsequently disappeared.

Her second husband died in 1916. She continued to live in Vergennes with her son Mitchell until her death from bronchial pneumonia at the age of 96.

Her former home, known as the Capts. Louis and Philomene Daniels House, has been listed on the National Register of Historic Places.
