= Marriage Equality Act (Vermont) =

An Act Relating to Civil Marriage

Vermont General Assembly
- Long title: "An Act to Protect Religious Freedom and Recognize Equality in Civil Marriage"
- Citation: Act 3, Regular Session, Session Laws of Vermont 2009
- Territorial extent: State of Vermont
- Passed by: Vermont General Assembly
- Passed: April 6, 2009
- Vetoed by: Governor Jim Douglas
- Vetoed: April 6, 2009
- Veto overridden: April 7, 2009
- Commenced: September 1, 2009

Legislative history
- Bill title: S.115
- Bill citation: Senate Bill No. 115
- Introduced by: Peter Shumlin, John F. Campbell, Claire D. Ayer

Summary
- "The purpose of this act is to recognize legal equality in the civil marriage laws and to protect the religious freedom of clergy and religious societies authorized to solemnize civil marriages."

Keywords
- same-sex marriage
- Status: In force

The Marriage Equality Act is a 2009 Vermont state law which legalized the officiating of marriages between same-sex couples in the state. The law went into effect on September 1, 2009. Vermont became the fourth state to legalize same-sex marriage, the first to do so by legislation rather than a court ruling.

== Prior status ==
Prior to the Act, same-sex couples in Vermont were allowed since 2000 to engage in civil unions, which granted some of the rights of married couples.

== Marriage legislation ==
On February 9, 2007, several house members introduced a bill to legalize same-sex marriage, but no action was taken. On July 25, 2007, legislative leaders announced the creation of an 11-member committee to study whether the state should do so. The Vermont Commission on Family Recognition and Protection held 8 public hearings and conducted a seminar at Vermont Law School. Opponents of same-sex marriage did not participate, saying the panel was not impartial. At one hearing, Peter Teachout, a law professor, suggested that the notion of two "tracks", civil union and marriage, could easily be discredited by creating the two without specifying whether same-sex couples or different-sex couples would get which. "Just flip a coin at the end and decide who gets marriage and who gets civil unions. Let's see how many people vote for the two-track system then." Another testified that 8 states recognized Vermont's civil unions as the equivalent of marriage. The commission reported on April 21, 2008, and rather than make a recommendation it said: "It is the role of Vermont's policy-makers and elected officials to read and reflect on this report and in their best judgment determine what steps to take in their role as public servants of the people of Vermont." It detailed the differences between civil unions and marriage and noted that a same-sex couple in a civil union lacked "access to less tangible incidents of marriage, including its terminology (e.g. marriage, wedding, married, celebration, divorce), and its social, cultural and historical significance". It noted that marriage was a status understood in other jurisdictions that lacked any equivalent for civil unions. Opponents said that a popular referendum remained the proper way to resolve the issue.

When Representative Mark Larson, on behalf of 59 co-sponsors, introduced a bill to legalize same-sex marriage on February 6, 2009, Governor Jim Douglas said economic and budgetary issues should be the legislature's first concern. The State Senate approved its version of the legislation on March 23 by a vote of 26 to 4. Kris Mineau, president for the Massachusetts Family Institute, said that advocates of same-sex marriage "have wisely targeted the New England states, because of their progressive stance on social issues. But we have not conceded defeat." Douglas announced his intention to veto the bill on March 25 for the first time. He said it was unusual to promise a veto before legislation passed but "During these extraordinary times, the speculation about my decision has added to the anxiety of the moment and further diverts attention from our most pressing issues". On April 3, the House passed an amended version of the bill 95–52, several votes shy of a veto-proof two-thirds majority. On April 6, 2009, the Vermont Senate approved the amendments made by the House. The governor vetoed the legislation the same day. He said he was "sending it to the Legislature urging them to do what their consciences lead them to do, most importantly to do it quickly and get on with the business of the state." He said he was not lobbying legislators: "I think this is such an emotional, divisive, personal issue, it's something that individuals have to decide how to vote on based on their personal convictions and faith and I think each legislator ought to decide personally what to do."

On April 7, 2009, the Senate overrode the veto by a 23–5 vote and the House overrode it 100–49, the first time since 1990 that a Vermont governor's veto was overridden. Six of those voting in favor of the legislation were Republicans. House Speaker Shap Smith said that votes changed in the House not because of specific pressures but because "it was to some degree just a vote to recognize the work that the Legislature had done". Representative Jeff Young, who switched his vote, said "I had to vote with my caucus" in order to win support for his other priorities. Brian Brown of the National Organization for Marriage said:

To the millions of Americans who care about marriage, we say get ready: President Obama and Democrats will use Vermont as an excuse to overturn the bipartisan federal Defense of Marriage Act. The next step is to ask the Supreme Court to impose gay marriage on all 50 states.
