= Pierre Chaignon =

French Jesuit priest and author (1791–1883)

Pierre Chaignon, S.J.

Personal life
- Born: 8 October 1791 Saint-Pierre-la-Cour, France
- Died: 20 September 1883 (aged 91) Angers, France

Religious life
- Religion: Roman Catholic
- Order: Society of Jesus
- Ordination: 14 August 1819

Pierre Chaignon, S.J. (1791–1883) was a French Jesuit priest and spiritual writer.

== Life ==
Pierre Chaignon was born in Saint-Pierre-la-Cour, Mayenne, France, on 8 October 1791.

He was professed into the Society of Jesus on 14 August 1819 at the age of 27, and spent his life as a priest in the spiritual direction of other priests, giving an estimated three hundred retreats to French clergy over the course of thirty years. He wrote a book of spiritual meditations for priests entitled Méditationes sacerdotales and established a Union of Prayer for Deceased Priests which was canonically erected into a confraternity in 1861.

He died at Angers on 20 September 1883.

== Bibliography ==
- Méditationes Sacerdotales (English: Sacerdotal Meditations or Meditations for the Use of the Secular Clergy)
- Le Salut Facilité aux Pécheurs par la Dévotion au Très Saint et Immaculé Coeur de Marie (English: The Easy Salvation of Sinners by Devotion of the Most Sacred and Immaculate Heart of Mary)
- Les Six Dimanches de St. Louis de Gonzague (English: Six Sundays of St. Aloysius Gonzaga)
- Le Prêtre è l'Autel (English: The Priest and the Altar or The Sacrifice of the Mass Worthily Celebrated)
- Paix de l'Ame (English: Peace of Soul)
