= Louis de Goesbriand =

French Catholic bishop (1816–1899)

Servant of God Louis de Goesbriand
- Bishop of Burlington
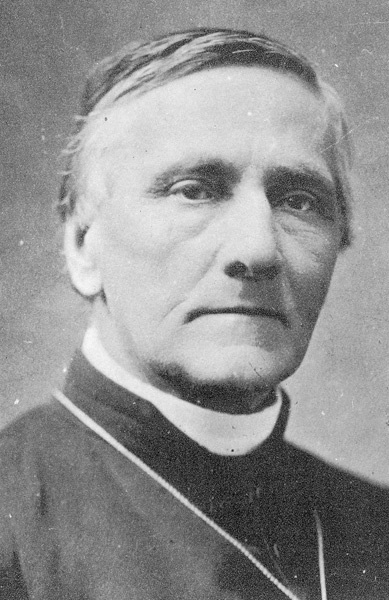
- Church: Catholic Church
- See: Diocese of Burlington
- Appointed: October 30, 1853
- Term ended: November 3, 1899
- Successor: John Stephen Michaud

Orders
- Ordination: July 13, 1840 by Giuseppe Rosati
- Consecration: October 30, 1853 by Gaetano Bedini

Personal details
- Born: August 4, 1816 Saint-Urbain, Finistère, France
- Died: November 3, 1899 (aged 83) Burlington, Vermont, U.S.
- Education: Seminary of Saint-Sulpice
- Motto: Deus providebit (God will provide)

Louis Joseph Marie Théodore de Goesbriand (August 4, 1816 – November 3, 1899) was a French-born prelate of the Catholic Church. He served as the first bishop of the Diocese of Burlington in Vermont from 1853 until his death in 1899. His cause for canonization was initiated by the Diocese of Burlington in 2019.

== Biography ==
=== Early life ===
Louis de Goesbriand was born on August 4, 1815, in Saint-Urbain, Finistère, in France to a wealthy family. He had nine siblings. After deciding to enter the priesthood, he studied at the Seminary of Saint-Sulpice in Paris. In 1840, Bishop Jean-Marie Graveran of the Diocese of Quimper released de Goesbriand to immigrate to the United States as a missionary.

=== Priesthood ===
On July 13, 1840, de Goesbriand was ordained to the priesthood in Paris by Bishop Giuseppe Rosati for the Diocese of Saint Paul. After he arrived in the United States, De Goesbriand did pastoral work for the Diocese of Cincinnati in Cincinnati, Ohio, from 1840 to 1847. In 1848 he was appointed rector of St. Francis de Sales Seminary in Wickliffe, Ohio and vicar general for the diocese.

=== Bishop of Burlington ===
On July 29, 1853, de Goesbriand was appointed as the first bishop of the newly erected Diocese of Burlington by Pope Pius IX. He received his episcopal consecration on October 30, 1853, at the Old St. Patrick's Cathedral in New York City from Archbishop Gaetano Bedini, with Bishops John McCloskey and Louis Rappe serving as co-consecrators. De Goesbriand began his new diocese with five priests, ten churches, and about 20,000 parishioners.

In January 1855, de Goesbriand traveled to Europe to recruit priests from Ireland and France to serve to Vermont. He held the first diocesan synod in Vermont in October 1855. He also attended the Plenary Councils of Baltimore in Baltimore, Maryland, in 1866 and 1884, and the First Vatican Council in Rome from 1869 to 1870. In 1893, De Goesbriand delegated administration of the diocese to Coadjutor Bishop John Stephen Michaud.

In 1892, de Goesbriand purchased land at Fort Sainte Anne on Isle La Motte in order to preserve its history. A small chapel was built. In August 1894, de Goesbriand consecrated the Diocese of Burlington to Saint Peter. He spent his entire family fortune constructing churches and orphanages and assisting the poor, dying with only four dollars left to his name.

Between 1891 and 1897, de Goesbriand translated several works of Reverend Pierre Chaignon from French to English, including Meditations for the Use of the Secular Clergy and The Sacrifice of the Mass Worthily Celebrated.

=== Death and legacy ===
Louis de Goesbriand died on November 3, 1899, at St. Joseph's Orphan Home in Burlington at age 83, then the oldest bishop in the United States. He is buried at Resurrection Park Cemetery in South Burlington, Vermont.

The diocese had least 50 priests and 30 new parishes when de Goesbriand died. In the 1920s, De Goesbriand Memorial Hospital in Burlington was created in his name.

Catholic Church titles
Preceded by none	Bishop of Burlington; 1853–1899	Succeeded by John Stephen Michaud
