= French-Canadian Americans =

Americans of French-Canadian birth or descent

Américains franco-canadiens (French)
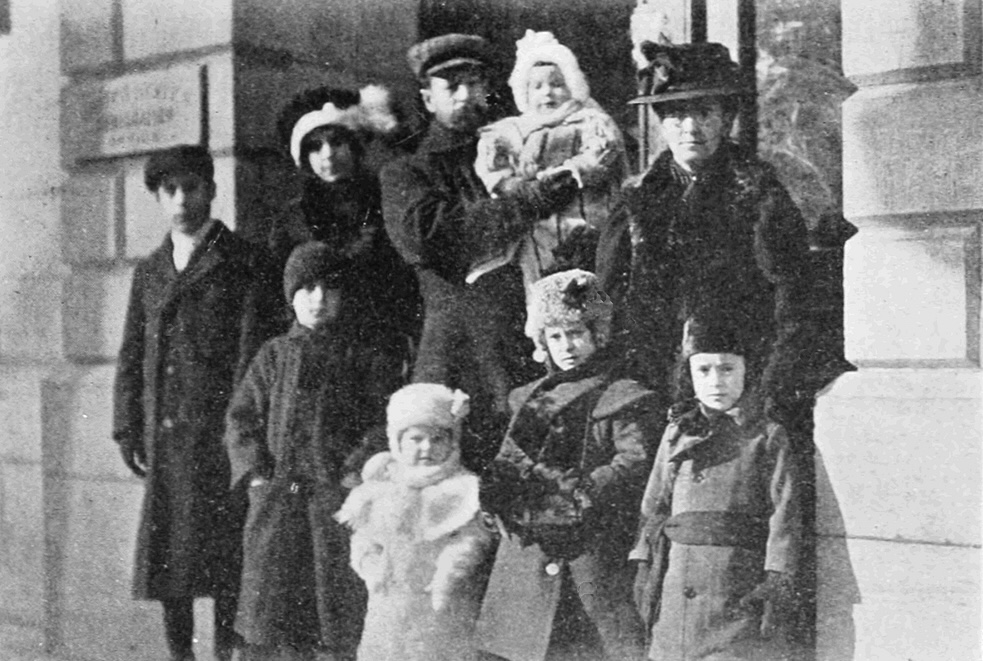
- Immigrant family from Montreal

Total population
- 1,998,012 (2020)

Regions with significant populations
- New England (especially Maine, Massachusetts, New Hampshire and Vermont), New York, Florida, Michigan, California and Louisiana

Languages
- English (Canadian and American) · French · Franglais

Religion
- Predominantly Roman Catholicism, minority of Protestantism

Related ethnic groups
- French and Canadian diasporas Especially other French Canadians, French Americans, Canadian Americans, Saint Pierre and Miquelon Islanders, French Louisianians, Métis Americans

French-Canadian Americans (French: Canadiens-Français des États-Unis; also referred to as Franco-Canadian Americans or Canadien Americans) are Americans of French Canadian descent. About 2 million U.S. residents cited this ancestry in the 2020 census. In the 2010 census, the majority of respondents reported speaking French at home. Americans of French-Canadian descent are most heavily concentrated in New England, New York State, Louisiana and the Midwest. Their ancestors mostly arrived in the United States from Quebec between 1840 and 1930, though some families became established as early as the 17th and 18th centuries.

The term Canadien (French for "Canadian") may be used either in reference to nationality or ethnicity in regard to this population group. French-Canadian Americans, because of their proximity to Canada and Quebec, kept their language, culture, and religion alive much longer than any other ethnic group in the United States apart from Mexican Americans. Many "Little Canada" neighborhoods developed in New England cities, but gradually disappeared as their residents eventually assimilated into the American mainstream. A revival of the Canadian identity has taken place in the Midwestern states, where some families of French descent have lived for many generations. These states had been considered part of Canada until 1783. A return to their roots seems to be taking place, with a greater interest in all things that are Canadian or Québécois.

== French-Canadian population in New England ==
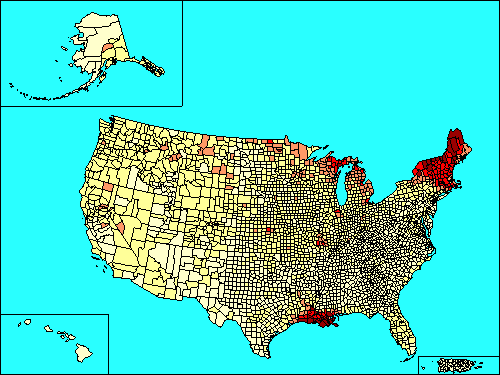
Distribution of Franco Americans according to the 2000 census

In the late 19th century, many Francophones arrived in New England from Quebec and New Brunswick to work in textile mill cities in New England. In the same period, Francophones from Quebec soon became a majority of the workers in the saw mill and logging camps in the Adirondack Mountains and their foothills. Others sought opportunities for farming and other trades such as blacksmiths in Upstate New York. By the mid-20th century, French-Canadian Americans comprised 30 percent of Maine's population. Some migrants became lumberjacks but most concentrated in industrialized areas and into enclaves known as Little Canadas in cities like Lewiston, Maine, Holyoke, Massachusetts, and Woonsocket, Rhode Island.

Driven by depleted farmlands, poverty and a lack of local economic opportunitunities, rural inhabitants of these areas sought work in the expanding mill industries. Newspapers in New England carried advertisements touting the desirability of wage labor work in the textile mills. In addition to industry's organized recruitment campaigns, the close kinship network of French-Canadians facilitated transnational communication and the awareness of economic opportunity for their friends and relatives. Individual French-Canadian families who desired dwellings developed French Canadian neighborhoods, called Petit Canadas, and sought out local financing. Most arrived through railroads such as the Grand Trunk Railroad.

French-Canadian women saw New England as a place of opportunity and possibility where they could create economic alternatives for themselves distinct from the expectations of their farm families in Canada. By the early 20th century some saw temporary migration to the United States to work as a rite of passage and a time of self-discovery and self-reliance. Most moved permanently to the United States, using the inexpensive railroad system to visit Quebec from time to time. When these women did marry, they had fewer children with longer intervals between children than their Canadian counterparts. Some women never married, and oral accounts suggest that self-reliance and economic independence were important reasons for choosing work over marriage and motherhood. These women conformed to traditional gender ideals in order to retain their 'Canadienne' cultural identity, but they also redefined these roles in ways that provided them increased independence in their roles as wives and mothers.

The French-Canadians became active in the Catholic Church where they tried with little success to challenge its domination by Irish clerics. They founded such newspapers as 'Le Messager' and 'La Justice.' The first hospital in Lewiston, Maine, became a reality in 1889 when the Sisters of Charity of Montreal, the "Grey Nuns", opened the doors of the Asylum of Our Lady of Lourdes. This hospital was central to the Grey Nuns' mission of providing social services for Lewiston's predominately French-Canadian mill workers. The Grey Nuns struggled to establish their institution despite meager financial resources, language barriers, and opposition from the established medical community. Immigration dwindled with the U.S. immigration restrictions after World War I.

The French-Canadian community in New England tried to preserve some of its cultural norms. This doctrine, like efforts to preserve Francophone culture in Quebec, became known as la Survivance.

== Cities ==
City	Percentage of population
Madawaska, Maine	75%
Frenchville, Maine	70%
Van Buren, Maine	65%
Fort Kent, Maine	63%
Berlin, New Hampshire	53.4%
Lewiston, Maine	50%
Auburn, Maine	46.2%
Biddeford, Maine	46%
Greene, Maine	43.1%
Hallandale Beach, Florida	42.1%

== States ==
State	
Maine	23.9%
New Hampshire	23.2%
Vermont	21.1%
Rhode Island	17.2%
Massachusetts	12.9%
Connecticut	9.9%

== French Canadian immigration to New England ==
Distribution of French Canadians in New England, 1860–1880
State	Francophones	Percentage	Francophones	Percentage
Maine	7,490	20.0%	29,000	13.9%
New Hampshire	1,780	4.7%	26,200	12.6%
Vermont	16,580	44.3%	33,500	16.1%
Massachusetts	7,780	20.8%	81,000	38.9%
Rhode Island	1,810	5.0%	19,800	9.5%
Connecticut	1,980	5.3%	18,500	8.9%
Total	37,420	100%	208,100	100%

Distribution of French Canadians in New England, 1900–1930
State	Francophones	Percentage	Francophones	Percentage
Maine	58,583	11.3%	99,765	13.4%
New Hampshire	74,598	14.4%	101,324	13.6%
Vermont	41,286	8.0%	46,956	6.4%
Massachusetts	250,024	48.1%	336,871	45.3%
Rhode Island	56,382	10.9%	91,173	12.3%
Connecticut	37,914	7.3%	67,130	9.0%
Total	518,887	100%	743,219	100%

== Notable French Canadian Americans ==
- John C. Frémont, first Republican nominee for President of the United States, former United States senator from California, former Military Governor of California, former Governor of the Arizona Territory
- Jack Kerouac, American Beat Generation novelist and poet
- John Cena, professional wrestler; has French-Canadian ancestry through his mother
- Ross Perot, business magnate, politician, and philanthropist
- Bugs Moran, crime boss and former leader of the North Side Gang in Chicago; had French-Canadian ancestry through his mother while his father immigrated from France.
- Alex Trebek, former host of Jeopardy!
- Annie Proulx, prolific writer, winner of the PEN/Faulkner Award for Fiction for her first novel, Postcards. Her second novel, The Shipping News (1993), won both the Pulitzer Prize for Fiction and the U.S. National Book Award for Fiction. Her short story "Brokeback Mountain" was adapted as an Academy Award, BAFTA and Golden Globe Award-winning motion picture released in 2005.
- Madonna, singer; has French-Canadian ancestry through her mother

== See also ==
- Francophone Canadians
- History of the Franco-Americans
- Canadian ethnicity
- French Vermonters
