= John Stephen Michaud =

American prelate

His Excellency, The Right Reverend John Stephen Michaud
- Bishop of Burlington; Titular Bishop of Modra
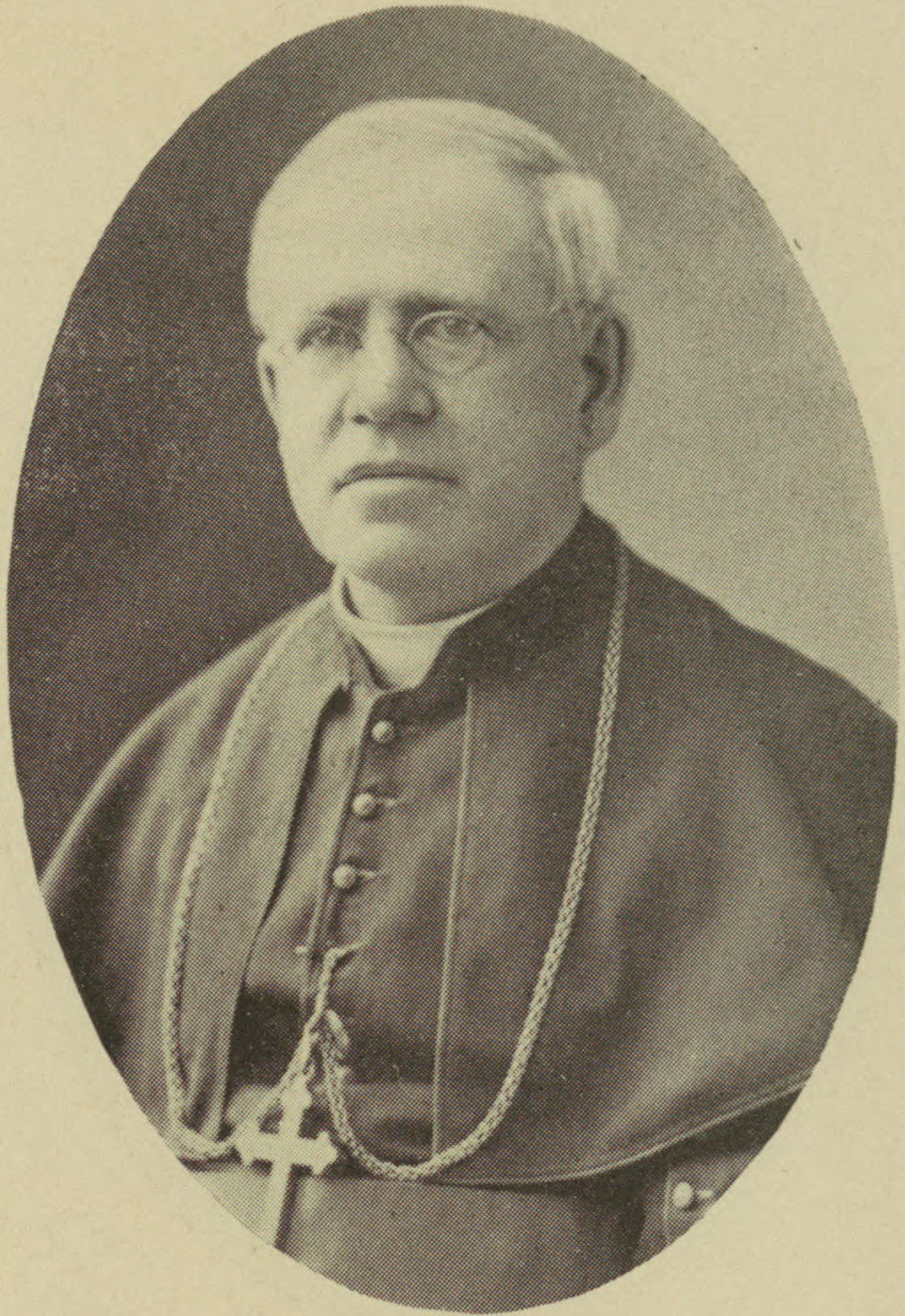
- Church: Roman Catholic Church
- See: Diocese of Burlington
- In office: November 3, 1899—December 22, 1908
- Predecessor: Louis De Goesbriand
- Successor: Joseph John Rice
- Previous post: Coadjutor Bishop of Burlington (1892-1899)

Orders
- Ordination: June 7, 1873 by Edgar Wadhams
- Consecration: June 29, 1892 by John Joseph Williams

Personal details
- Born: November 24, 1843 Burlington, Vermont, U.S.
- Died: December 22, 1908 (aged 65) New York City, U.S.
- Education: Bryant and Stratton Commercial College; Collège de Montréal; College of the Holy Cross (BA)
- Motto: Pax vobis (Peace be with you)
- Coat of arms

John Stephen Michaud (November 24, 1843 – December 22, 1908) was an American prelate of the Roman Catholic Church. He served as bishop of the Diocese of Burlington in Vermont from 1899 until his death in 1908.

== Biography ==
=== Early life ===
John Michaud was born on November 24, 1843, in Burlington, Vermont, to Stephen and Catherine (née Rogan) Michaud. He attended a school run by Reverend Jeremiah O'Callaghan, the first resident priest of Vermont, and served as an altar boy to Bishop Louis De Goesbriand. Michaud worked for several lumber companies in Burlington.

Michaud later studied at the Bryant and Stratton Commercial College campus in Vermont. In September 1865, he entered the College of Montreal in Montreal, Quebec. Returning to the United States, Michaud attended the College of the Holy Cross in Worcester, Massachusetts, earning a Bachelor of Arts degree in 1870. He then went to Saint Joseph's Provincial Seminary in Troy, New York.

=== Priesthood ===
Michaud was ordained to the priesthood for the Diocese of Burlington at Saint Joseph's Seminary by Bishop Edgar Wadhams on June 7, 1873. After his ordination, the diocese assigned Michaud to in Newport, Albany, Barton and Lowell, all in Vermont, where he established their first Catholic churches. After recovering from smallpox, Michaud fulfilled other pastoral assignments during the 1870s. Michaud returned to Burlington in 1879 to build the St. Joseph's Orphanage, completed in 1883. Michaud also performed pastoral work for Vermont parishes in Bennington, North Bennington, Fairfield, Underhill and Charlotte. He was later named pastor of St. Stephen's Parish in Winooski, Vermont. After a sabbatical to Europe, he returned to Vermont in 1885 to become pastor of St. Francis de Sales Parish in Bennington.

=== Bishop of Burlington ===
On May 4, 1892, Michaud was appointed coadjutor bishop of Burlington and titular bishop of Modra by Pope Leo XIII. He received his episcopal consecration on June 29, 1892, at the Cathedral of the Immaculate Conception in Burlington from Archbishop John Williams, with Bishops Denis Bradley and Henry Gabriels serving as co-consecrators. He automatically became the second bishop of Burlington upon Bishop De Goesbriand death on November 3, 1899.

During his tenure, Michaud completed the cathedral, built the Fanny Allen Hospital in Burlington and staffed it with the Religious Hospitalers of St. Joseph. The Sisters of Charity of Providence opened another new hospital in St. Johnsbury, Vermont; the Loretto Home for the Aged in Rutland, Vermont, was served by the Sisters of St. Joseph. In 1904, Michaud invited the Society of Saint Edmund to establish Saint Michael's College in Colchester, Vermont. In 1905, the Daughters of Charity of the Sacred Heart of Jesus came to Newport, where they opened a mission to serve as teachers, nurses and catechists for the Northeast Kingdom region of the state.

=== Death ===
In 1908, Michaud was diagnosed with kidney disease. He died on December 22, 1908, in New York City at age 63. He is buried at Resurrection Park Cemetery in South Burlington. During his tenure, Michaud expanded the number of churches in the diocese from 72 to 94. There were 75,000 Catholics, 102 priests, 286 religious sisters, and 20 parochial schools serving some 7000 students.

Catholic Church titles
Preceded by Louis De Goesbriand	Bishop of Burlington; 1899—1908	Succeeded by Joseph John Rice
