= List of Bernie Sanders 2020 presidential campaign endorsements =

Sanders for President
- Campaign: 2020 United States presidential election (Democratic Party primaries)
- Candidate: Bernie Sanders; U.S. Senator from Vermont (2007–present); U.S. Representative from Vermont's at-large congressional district (1991–2007); Mayor of Burlington (1981–1989)
- Affiliation: Democratic Party
- Status: Inactive
- Announced: February 19, 2019
- Suspended: April 8, 2020
- Headquarters: Burlington, Vermont Washington, D.C.
- Slogan(s): Not me. Us. Feel the Bern

Website
- berniesanders.com

This is a list of notable individuals and organizations who voiced their endorsement of Bernie Sanders' campaign for the Democratic Party's nomination for the 2020 U.S. presidential election before he dropped out of the race on April 8, 2020.

== Federal officials ==
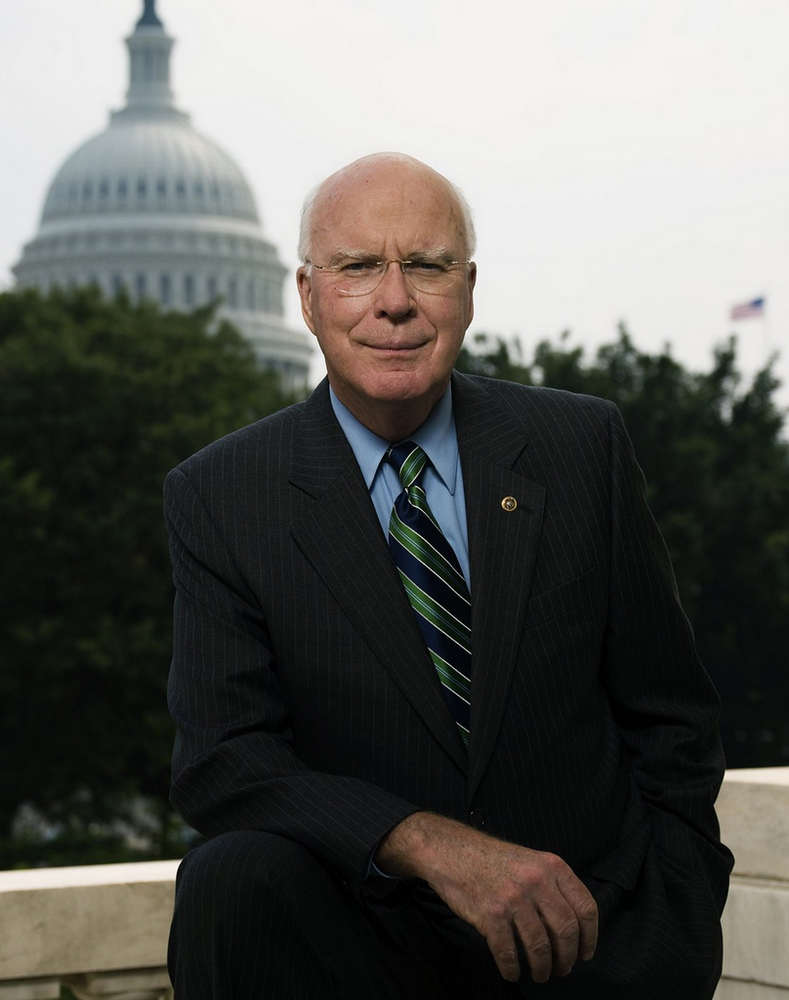
Patrick Leahy

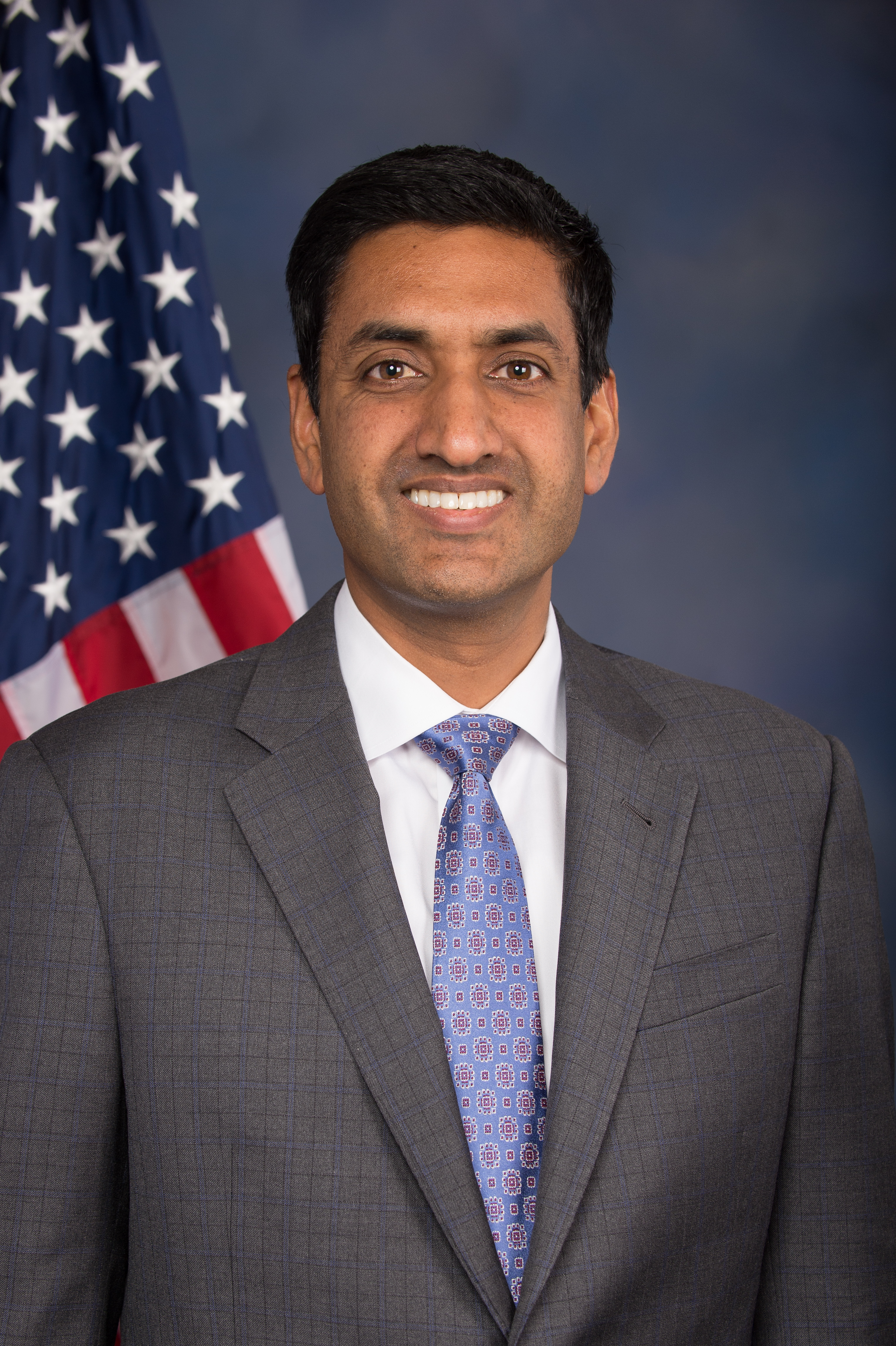
Ro Khanna

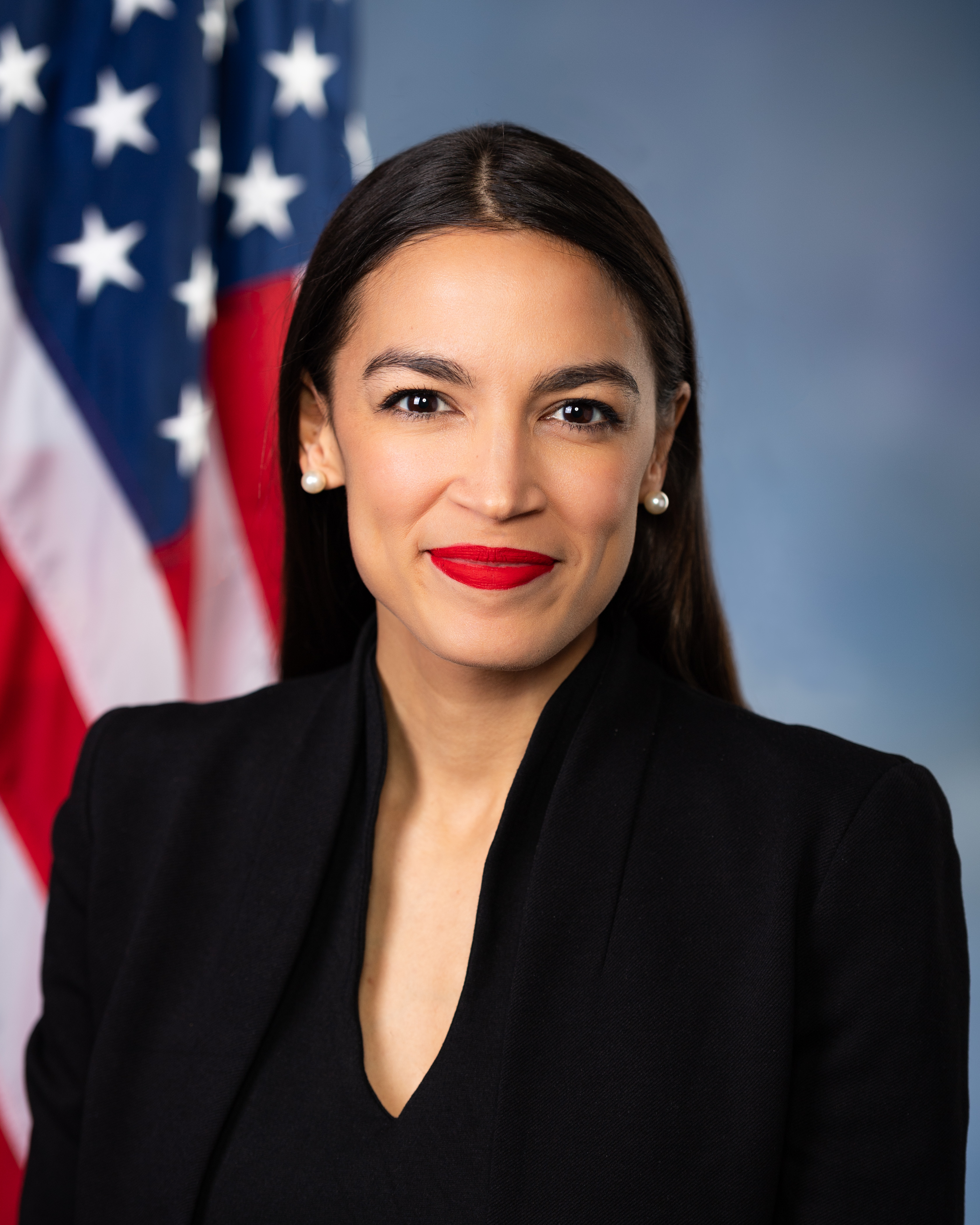
Alexandria Ocasio-Cortez

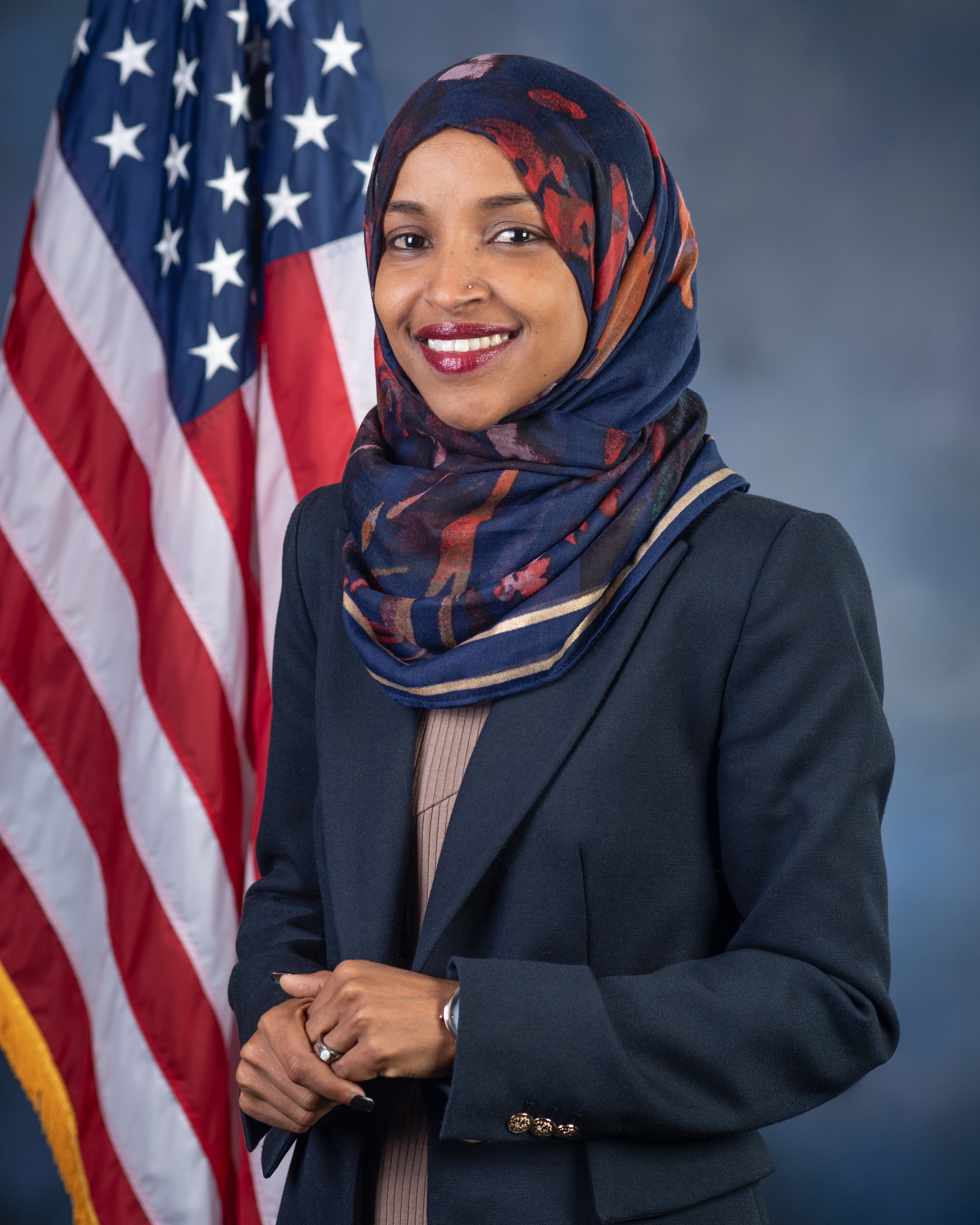
Ilhan Omar

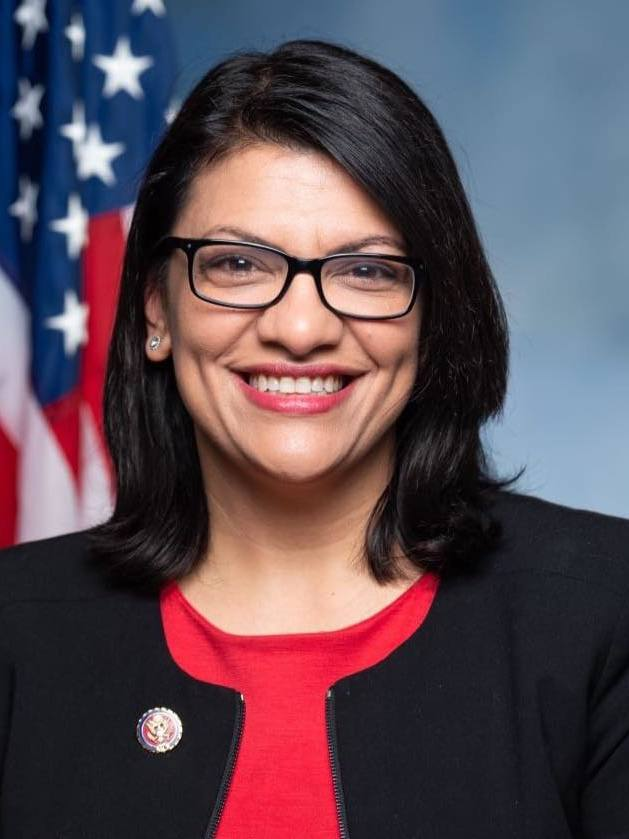
Rashida Tlaib

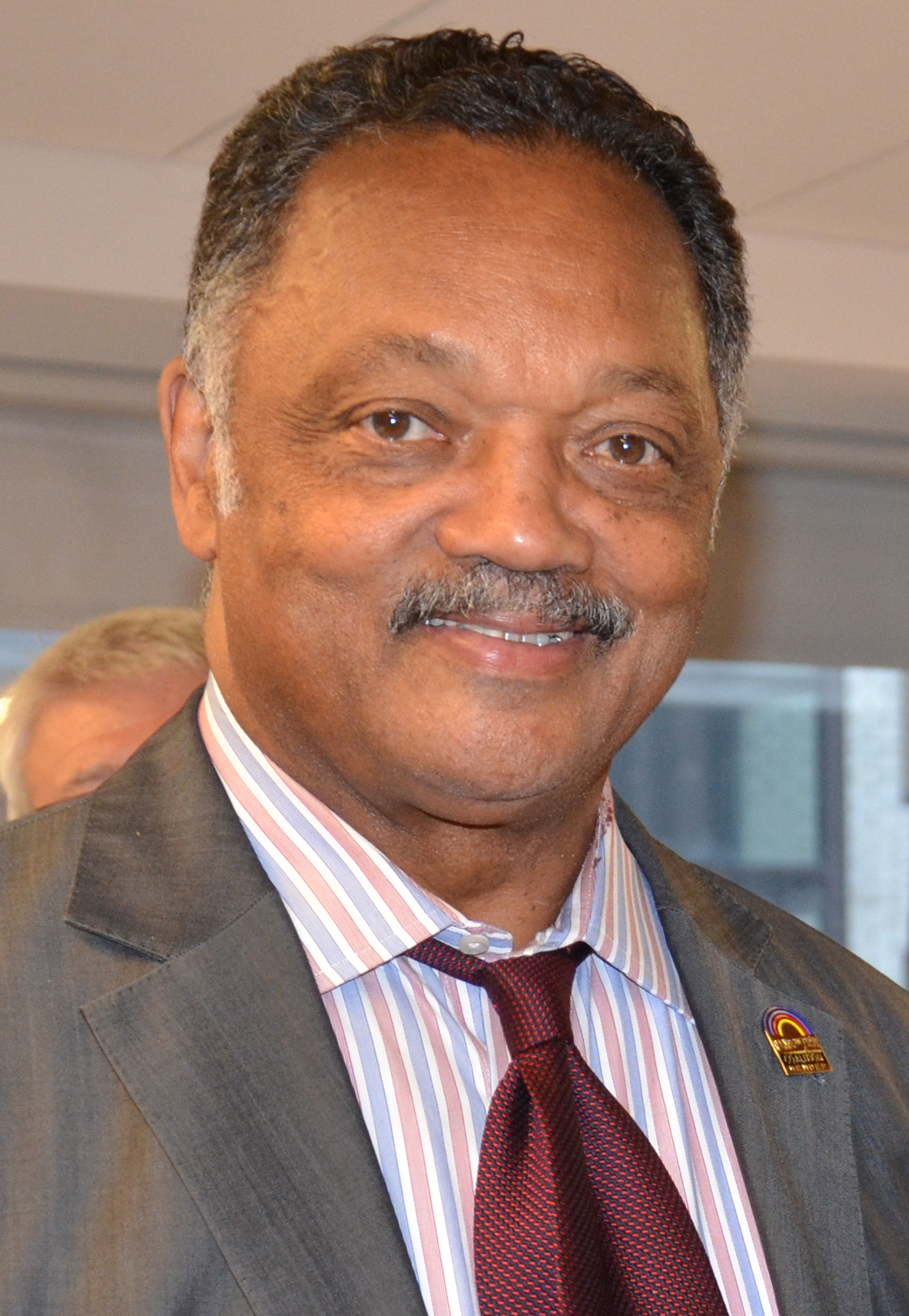
Jesse Jackson

=== U.S. senators ===
==== Current ====
- Patrick Leahy, U.S. senator from Vermont (1975–2023), ranking member of the Senate Appropriations Committee (2017–2023), president pro tempore of the United States Senate (2012–2015), chair (2007–2015, 2001–2003) and ranking member (2015–2017, 2003–2007, 1997–2001) of the Senate Judiciary Committee, chair (1987–1995) and ranking member (1995–1997) of the Senate Agriculture Committee

==== Former ====
- Mike Gravel, U.S. senator from Alaska (1969–1981), 2020 and 2008 candidate for president (co-endorsement with Tulsi Gabbard)
- Donald Riegle, U.S. senator from Michigan (1976–1995), chair of the Senate Banking Committee (1989–1995), U.S. representative from MI-07 (1967–1976)

=== U.S. representatives ===
==== Current ====
- Chuy García, U.S. representative from IL-04 (2019–present)
- Pramila Jayapal, U.S. representative from WA-07 (2017–present), chair of the Congressional Progressive Caucus (2019–2025)
- Ro Khanna, U.S. representative from CA-17 (2017–present) and Bernie Sanders 2020 presidential campaign national co-chair
- Alexandria Ocasio-Cortez, U.S. representative from NY-14 (2019–present)
- Ilhan Omar, U.S. representative from MN-5 (2019–present)
- Mark Pocan, U.S. representative from WI-2 (2013–present), chair of the Congressional Progressive Caucus (2017–2021)
- Mark Takano, U.S. representative from CA-41 (2013–present), chair (2019–2023) and ranking member (2016–2017) of the House Veterans' Affairs Committee
- Rashida Tlaib, U.S. representative from MI-13 (2019–present)
- Peter Welch, U.S. representative from VT-AL (2007–2023), 1990 nominee for governor of Vermont

=== U.S. shadow congresspersons ===
==== Former ====
- Jesse Jackson Sr., shadow U.S. senator from the District of Columbia (1991–1997), 1988 and 1984 candidate for president, founder of Rainbow/PUSH

=== Former cabinet-level officials ===
- Robert Reich, U.S. secretary of labor (1993–1997) (co-endorsement with Elizabeth Warren)

== State officials ==
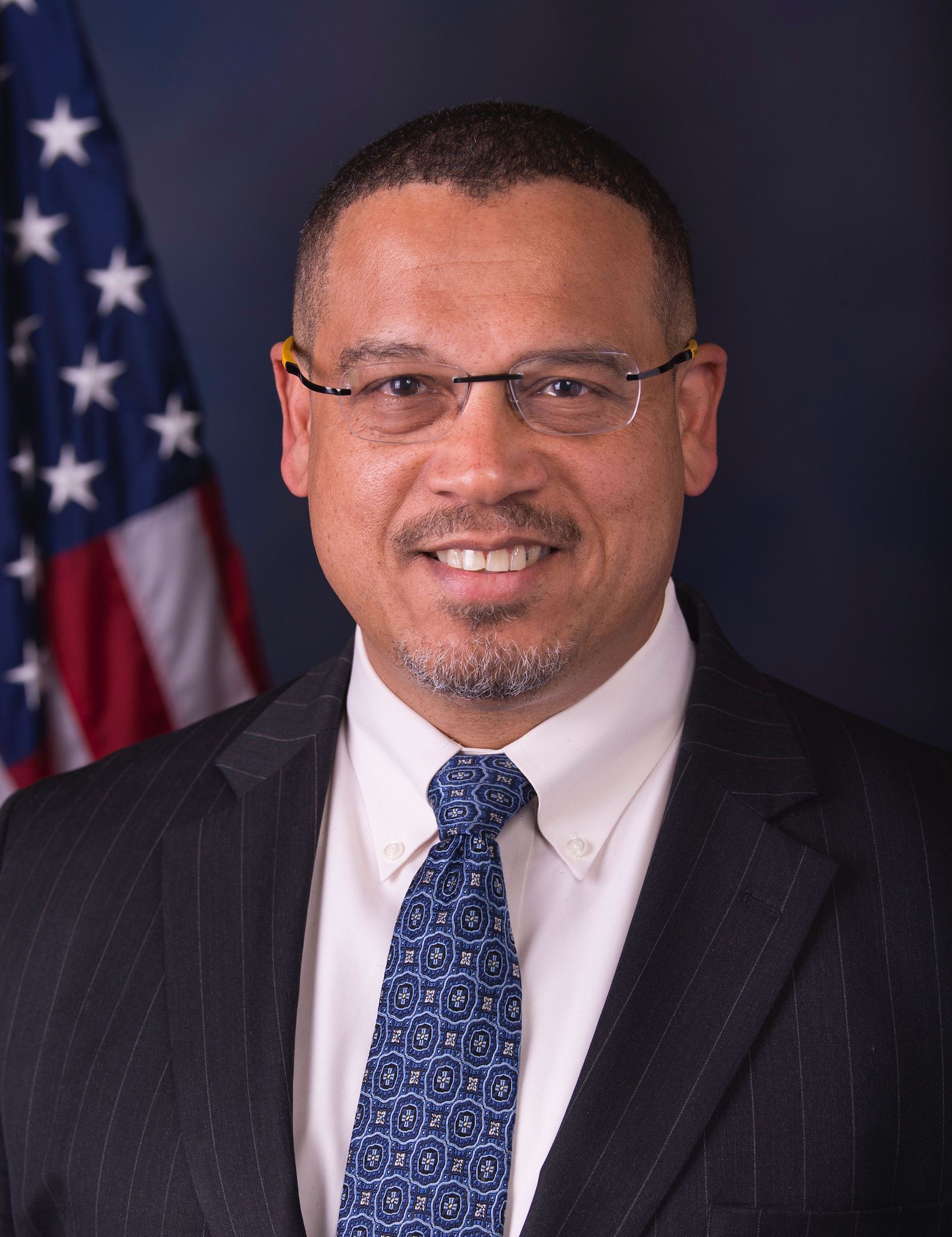
Keith Ellison

=== State executive officials ===
==== Current ====
- T. J. Donovan, attorney general of Vermont (2017–2022)
- Keith Ellison, attorney general of Minnesota (2019–present), U.S. representative from MN-5 (2007–2019), chair of the Congressional Progressive Caucus (2011–2017), deputy DNC chair (2017–2018)
- Doug Hoffer, Vermont auditor of accounts (2013–present)
- Beth Pearce, treasurer of Vermont (2011–2024)
- Tony Vazquez, member of the California State Board of Equalization (2019–present)
- Andru Volinsky, member of the Executive Council of New Hampshire from District 2 (2017–present), candidate for governor of New Hampshire in 2020
- David Zuckerman, lieutenant governor of Vermont (2017–2021), candidate for governor of Vermont in 2020 (VPP)

==== Former ====
- Jim Hightower, 8th Texas Agriculture Commissioner (1983–1991)

=== State legislators ===
==== Current ====
- Ako Abdul-Samad, Iowa representative from District 35 (2007–2025)
- Gabriel Acevero, Maryland delegate from District 39 (2019–present)
- Joshua Adjutant, New Hampshire representative from Grafton District 17 (2018–2023)
- Rasheen Aldridge, Missouri representative from District 78 (2020–2023)
- Terry Alexander, South Carolina representative from District 59 (2007–present)
- Carol Ammons, Illinois representative from District 103 (2015–present)
- Saud Anwar, Connecticut senator from District 3 (2019–present)
- Tim Ashe, Vermont senator from Chittenden (2009–2021), Vermont Senate president (2017–2021)
- Chris Balch, New Hampshire representative from Hillsborough District 38 (2018–2020)
- Justin Bamberg, South Carolina representative from District 90 (2014–present)
- Sam Bell, Rhode Island senator from District 5 (2019–present)
- Charles Booker, Kentucky state representative from District 43 (2019–2021), 2020 Democratic candidate for the US Senate in Kentucky
- Amanda Bouldin, New Hampshire representative from Hillsborough District 12 (2015–present)
- Andrew Bouldin, New Hampshire representative from Hillsborough District 12 (2018–2022)
- David Bowen, Wisconsin assemblyman from District 10 (2014–2023)
- Margie Bright Matthews, South Carolina senator from District 45 (2015–present)
- Ryan Buchanan, New Hampshire representative from Merrimack District 15 (2018–present)
- Ruth Buffalo, North Dakota representative from District 27 (2018–2022)
- Hunter Cantrell, Minnesota representative from District 56A (2018–2021)
- Lee Carter, Virginia delegate from District 50 (2018–2022)
- Wendy Chase, New Hampshire representative from Strafford District 18 (2018–present)
- Justin Chenette, Maine senator from District 31 (2016–2020)
- Ben Chipman, Maine senator from District 27 (2016–present)
- Kansen Chu, California assemblymember from District 25 (2014–2020)
- Skip Cleaver, New Hampshire representative from Hillsborough District 35 (2016–2022)
- Benjamin Collings, Maine representative (2016–present)
- Mike Connolly, Massachusetts representative from Middlesex District 26 (2017–present)
- Scott Cuddy, Maine representative from District 98 (2018–present)
- Robert Cushing, New Hampshire representative from Rockingham District 21 (2012–2022)
- Mike D'Agostino, Connecticut state representative from District 91 (2013–2025)
- Raymond Dehn, Minnesota representative from District 59B (2013–present)
- Jamie Eldridge, Massachusetts Senator from Middlesex and Worcester District (2009–present)
- Arthur Ellison, New Hampshire representative from Merrimack District 27 (2018–present)
- Nika Elugardo, Massachusetts representative from Suffolk District 15 (2019–present)
- Paul Feeney, Massachusetts Senator from Bristol and Norfolk District (2017–present)
- Sallie Fellows, New Hampshire representative from Grafton District 8 (2018–present)
- Elizabeth Fiedler, Pennsylvania representative from District 184 (2019–present)
- Sherry Frost, New Hampshire representative from Strafford District 16 (2016–present)
- Michael Gianaris, New York senator from District 12 (2011–present)
- Wendell Gilliard, South Carolina representative from District 111 (2009–present)
- Aisha Gomez, Minnesota representative from District 62B (2019–present)
- Elizabeth Guzmán, Virginia delegate from District 31 (2018–present)
- Will Guzzardi, Illinois representative from District 39 (2015–present)
- Abdullah Hammoud, Michigan representative from District 15 (2017–present)
- Bob Hasegawa, Washington senator from District 11 (2013–present)
- Hodan Hassan, Minnesota representative from District 62A (2019–present), assistant majority leader
- Leon Howard, South Carolina Representative from District 76 (1995–present)
- Sara Innamorato, Pennsylvania representative from District 21 (2019–present)
- Jeff Irwin, Michigan senator from District 18 (2019–present)
- Troy Jackson, Maine senator from District 1 (2008–2014, 2016–present), president of the Maine Senate (2018–present)
- Reggie Jones-Sawyer, California assemblymember from District 59 (2012–present) (previously endorsed Kamala Harris)
- Ash Kalra, California assemblymember from District 27 (2016–present)
- Cam Kenney, New Hampshire representative from Strafford District 6 (2018–present)
- Christopher Kessler, Maine representative from District 32 (2018–present)
- Ron Kim, New York assemblymember from District 40 (2013–present)
- Mark King, New Hampshire representative from Hillsborough District 33 (2016–present)
- Jeff Kurtz, Iowa representative from District 83 (2019–present)
- Summer Lee, Pennsylvania representative from District 34 (2019–present)
- Martin Looney, Connecticut senator from District 11 (1993–present) and president pro tempore of the Connecticut Senate (2015–present)
- Liz Lovelett, Washington senator from District 40 (2019–present)
- Carlos Mariani, Minnesota representative from District 65B (1991–present)
- Paul Mark, Massachusetts representative from Berkshire District 2 (2011–present)
- John Marty, Minnesota senator from District 63 (1987–1993), District 54 (1993–2013) and District 66 (2013–present), 1994 nominee and 2010 candidate for governor of Minnesota
- Krystle Matthews, South Carolina representative from District 117 (2019–present)
- Genevieve McDonald, Maine representative from District 134 (2018–present)
- Cezar McKnight, South Carolina representative from District 101 (2014–present)
- David Miramant, Maine senator from District 12 (2014–present)
- Michael Moran, Massachusetts representative from Suffolk District 18 (2005–present)
- Walter T. Mosley, New York assemblymember from District 57 (2013–present)
- Wayne Moynihan, New Hampshire representative from Coos District 2 (1996–1998, 2012–present)
- Nancy Murphy, New Hampshire representative from Hillsborough District 21 (2018–present)
- Rena Newell, tribal representative of the Passamaquoddy to the Maine House of Representatives (2016–present) (Note: Maine tribal representatives are nonvoting in the Maine House of Representatives.)
- Joe Nguyen, Washington senator from District 34 (2019–present)
- Fran Nutter-Upham, New Hampshire representative from Hillsborough District 33 (2018–present)
- Aarón Ortíz, Illinois representative from District 1 (2019–present)
- Jerry Ortiz y Pino, New Mexico senator from District 12 (2005–present)
- Chris Pearson, Vermont senator from Chittenden (2017–present) (VPP)
- Robert Peters, Illinois senator from District 13 (2019–present)
- Yousef Rabhi, Michigan representative from District 53 (2017–present)
- Delia Ramirez, Illinois representative from District 4 (2019–present)
- Jessica Ramos, New York senator from District 13 (2019–present)
- Marcia Ranglin-Vassell, Rhode Island representative from District 5 (2017–present)
- Ellen Read, New Hampshire representative from Rockingham District 17 (2016–present)
- Cecilia Rich, New Hampshire representative from Strafford District 18 (2018–present) (previously endorsed Cory Booker)
- Michael Rivers, South Carolina representative from District 121 (2016–present)
- Isaac Robinson, Michigan representative from District 4 (2019–2020)
- Angela Romero, Utah state representative from District 26 (2013–present)
- Jacob Rosecrants, Oklahoma representative from District 46 (2017–present)
- Deane Rykerson, Maine representative from District 1 (2012–present)
- Lindsay Sabadosa, Massachusetts representative from Hampshire District 1 (2019–present)
- Julia Salazar, New York senator from District 18 (2019–present)
- Ibraheem Samirah, Virginia delegate from District 86 (2019–present)
- James Sanders Jr., New York senator from District 10 (2013–present)
- Janice Schmidt, New Hampshire representative from Hillsborough District 28 (2016–present)
- Luis Sepúlveda, New York senator from District 32 (2017–present) (previously endorsed Bill de Blasio)
- Emily Sirota, Colorado representative from District 9 (2019–present)
- Timothy J. Smith, New Hampshire representative from Hillsborough District 17 (2012–present)
- Catherine Sofikitis, New Hampshire representative from Hillsborough District 34 (2016–present)
- Phil Steck, New York assemblymember from District 110 (2013–present)
- Vaughn Stewart, Maryland delegate for District 19 (2019–present)
- Mary Sullivan, Vermont state representative from Chittenden (2015–present), DNC member from Vermont
- Mike Sylvester, Maine representative from District 39 (2016–present)
- Rachel Talbot Ross, Maine representative from District 40 (2016–present)
- Ivory Thigpen, South Carolina representative from District 79 (2016–present)
- Dan Toomey, New Hampshire representative from Hillsborough District 32 (2018–present)
- Sparky Von Plinsky, New Hampshire representative from Cheshire District 7 (2018–present)
- Shedron Williams, South Carolina representative from District 122 (2018–present)

==== Former ====
- Tom Ammiano, California assemblymember from Districts 17 and 13 (2008–2014)
- Clem Balanoff, Illinois representative from District 35/32 (1989–1995)
- Wenona Benally, Arizona representative from District 7 (2017–2019)
- Jeanine Calkin, Rhode Island senator from District 30 (2017–2018)
- Maralyn Chase, Washington senator from District 32 (2011–2019), Washington state representative from District 32 (2001–2011)
- Mark Dion, Maine representative from District 113 (2010–2016)
- Carina Driscoll, Vermont representative from Chittenden District 7–4 (2001–2003), stepdaughter of Bernie Sanders
- Eileen Ehlers, New Hampshire representative from Merrimack District 9 (2006–2008)
- Lucy Flores, Nevada assemblymember from District 28 (2011–2015) (previously endorsed Elizabeth Warren)
- Vincent Fort, Georgia senator from District 39 (1996–2017)
- Sylvia Gale, New Hampshire representative from Hillsborough District 28 (2012–2014)
- Rod Halvorson, Iowa senator from District 7 (1995–1999) and representative from Districts 13 and 46 (1979–1995)
- Beverly Hannon, Iowa senator from District 22 (1985–1993)
- Kaniela Ing, Hawaii representative from District 11 (2012–2018)
- Tishaura Jones, former Missouri state representative from District 63 (2009–2013) and treasurer of St. Louis (2013–present) (previously endorsed Elizabeth Warren)
- Mark MacKenzie, New Hampshire representative from Hillsborough District 17 (2016–2018), N.H. AFL–CIO President Emeritus
- Patrick K. McGowan, Maine representative from District 29 (1980–1990)
- Michael Merrifield, Colorado senator from District 11 (2015–2019), Colorado representative from District 18 (2002–2010)
- Mindi Messmer, New Hampshire representative from Rockingham District 24 (2016–2018)
- Kathleen O'Connor Ives, Massachusetts senator from Essex District 1 (2013–2018)
- John Patrick, Maine senator from District 18 (2010–2016)
- Christine Pellegrino, New York assemblymember from District 9 (2017–2019)
- Joe Perry, Maine senator from District 32 (2004–2010)
- C. J. Prentiss, Ohio senator from District 21 (1999–2006), Ohio representative from District 8 (1991–1998)
- Aaron Regunberg, Rhode Island representative from District 4 (2015–2019)
- Joe Salazar, Colorado representative from District 31 (2013–2019)
- Jimmy Tarlau, Maryland delegate from District 47A (2015–2019)
- Nina Turner, Ohio senator from District 25 (2008–2014), president of Our Revolution, Democratic National Committee member, 2020 national co-chair
- John Tuthill, New Hampshire representative from Sullivan District 11 (1998–2000) (Independent)
- Litesa Wallace, Illinois representative from District 67 (2014–2019)
- Mariko Yamada, California assemblymember from District 4 and 8 (2008–2014)

== Local and municipal officials ==
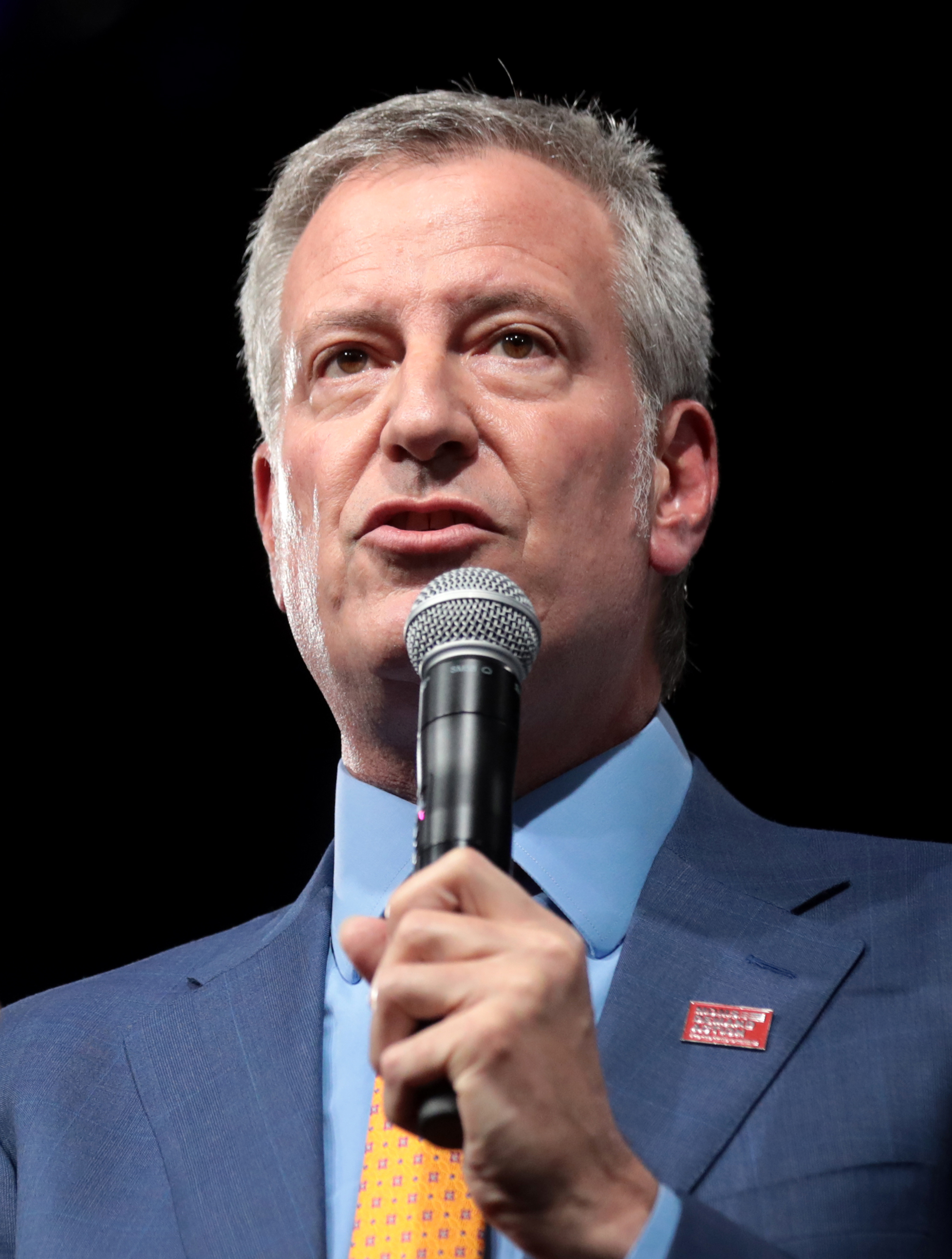
Bill de Blasio

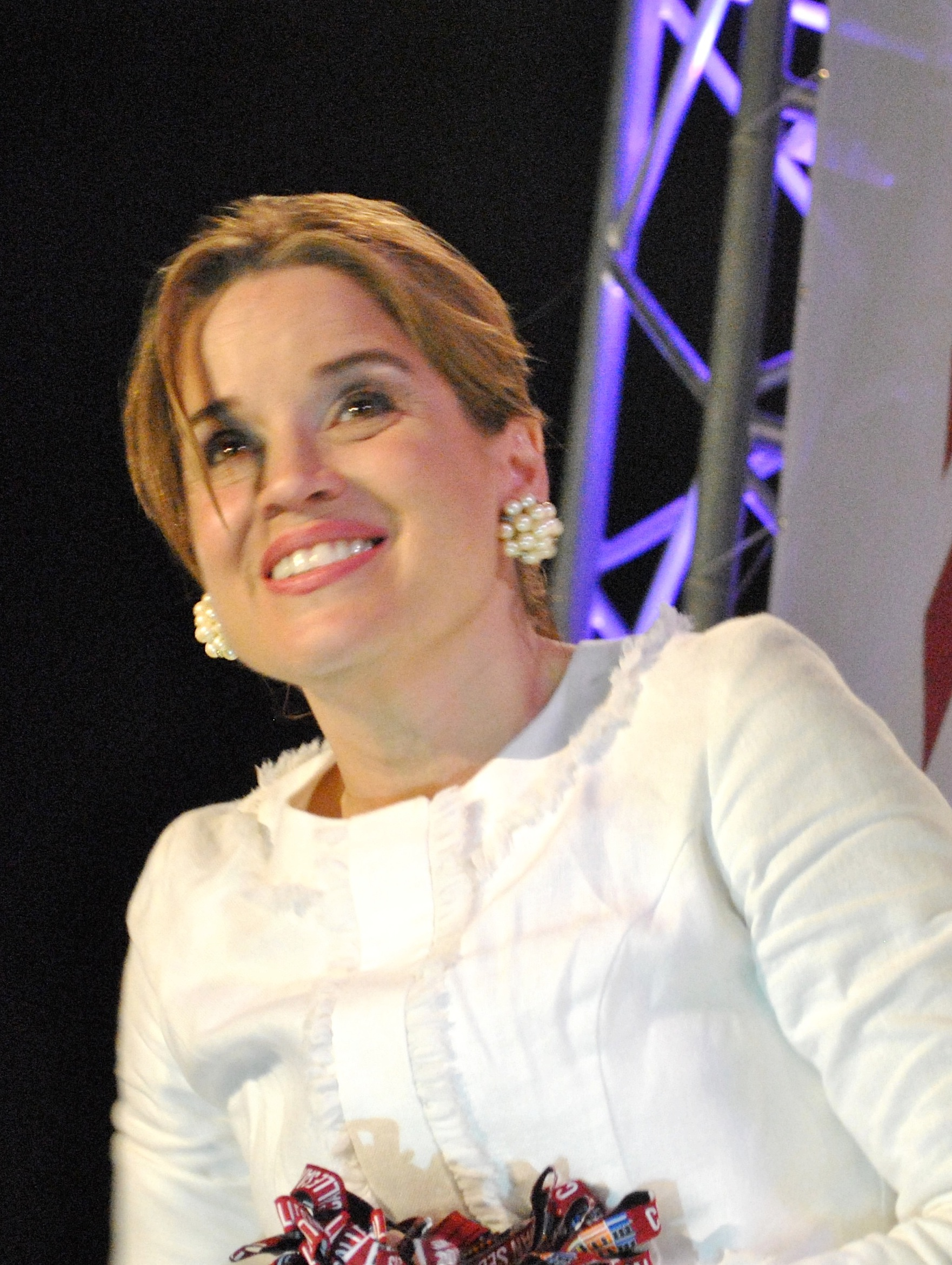
Carmen Yulín Cruz

=== Mayors ===
==== Current ====
- Jesse Arreguín, mayor of Berkeley, CA (2016–2024)
- Carmen Yulín Cruz, mayor of San Juan, PR (2013–2020), 2020 national co-chair
- Bill de Blasio, mayor of New York City, NY (2014–2021) and 2020 presidential candidate
- Wilda Diaz, mayor of Perth Amboy, NJ (2008–2020)
- Chokwe Antar Lumumba, mayor of Jackson, MS (2017–2025)
- Ted Terry, mayor of Clarkston, GA (2014–2020), 2020 candidate for Senate, Democratic National Committee member

==== Former ====
- Gayle McLaughlin, mayor of Richmond, CA (2007–2015) (former Green)
- Gus Newport, mayor of Berkeley, CA (1979–1986)

=== Municipal executive officials ===
==== Current ====
- Chesa Boudin, district attorney of San Francisco, CA (2020–2022)
- Tishaura Jones, treasurer of St. Louis, MO (2013–2021) (previously endorsed Elizabeth Warren)
- Tom Nelson, Outagamie County executive (2011–present)
- Jumaane Williams, public advocate of New York City, NY (2019–present)

==== Former ====
- Abdul El-Sayed, health officer and executive director of the Detroit Health Department (2015–2018)

=== Municipal legislators ===
==== Current ====
- Mike Bonin, member of the Los Angeles City Council (2013–present)
- Justin Brannan, member of the New York City Council (2018–present)
- Kendra Brooks, member of the Philadelphia City Council (2019–present) (WFP)
- Alondra Cano, member of the Minneapolis City Council (2014–present)
- Greg Casar, member of the Austin City Council (2015–2022)
- Candi CdeBaca, member of the Denver City Council (2019–present)
- Gil Cedillo, member of the Los Angeles City Council (2013–present), California Senator (2002–2010), California Assemblyperson (1998–2002, 2010–2012)
- Costa Constantinides, member of the New York City Council (2014–present) (previously endorsed Elizabeth Warren)
- Jeremiah Ellison, member of the Minneapolis City Council (2018–present)
- Jon Fishman, member of Lincolnville, Maine Board of selectmen (2017–present), drummer in Phish
- Noel Gallo, member of the Oakland City Council (2013–present)
- Lorena González, Member of the Seattle City Council (2015–present), President of the Seattle City Council (2020–present)
- Helen Gym, member of the Philadelphia City Council (2016–present)
- Matt Haney, member of the San Francisco Board of Supervisors (2017–present)
- Safiya Khalid, member of the Lewiston City Council (2019–present)
- Brad Lander, member of the New York City Council for District 39 (2009–present) (previously endorsed Elizabeth Warren)
- Gordon Mar, member of the San Francisco Board of Supervisors (2019–present)
- Teresa Mosqueda, member of the Seattle City Council (2017–present)
- Aaron Peskin, member of the San Francisco Board of Supervisors (2001–2009, 2015–present), president of the San Francisco Board of Supervisors (2005–2009)
- Dean Preston, member of the San Francisco Board of Supervisors (2019–present)
- Carlos Ramirez-Rosa, member of the Chicago City Council (2015–present)
- Rossana Rodriguez-Sanchez, member of the Chicago City Council (2019–present)
- Hillary Ronen, member of the San Francisco Board of Supervisors (2017–present)
- Helen Rosenthal, member of the New York City Council (2014–present)
- Susan Sadlowski Garza, member of the Chicago City Council (2015–present)
- Tara Samples, member of the Akron, Ohio City Council (2014–present), 2018 candidate for Lieutenant Governor of Ohio
- Mark Sanchez, member of the San Francisco Board of Education from 2001 to 2009 and 2016–present, president of the board from 2007 to 2009 and 2020–present, vice president of the board (2018–2019)
- Kshama Sawant, member of the Seattle City Council (2014–present) (SA)
- Tick Segerblom, member of the Clark County Commission (2019–present), Nevada Senator (2013–2018), Nevada Assemblyperson (2007–2013)
- Byron Sigcho-Lopez, member of the Chicago City Council (2019–present)
- Jeanette B. Taylor, member of the Chicago City Council (2019–present)
- Andre Vasquez, member of the Chicago City Council (2019–present)
- Girmay Zahilay, member of the King County Council from District 2 (2019–present)

==== Former ====
- John Avalos, member of San Francisco Board of Supervisors (2009–2017)
- Jovanka Beckles, member of the Richmond, California City Council (2010–2018)
- Cecil Bothwell, member of the Asheville, North Carolina City Council (2009–2017)
- David Campos, member of San Francisco Board of Supervisors (2008–2016), San Francisco Democratic Party chair
- Rafael Espinal, member of the New York City Council (2014–2020)
- Jim Keady, member of the Asbury Park, New Jersey City Council (2005–08), Nike sweatshops activist
- Jane Kim, member of the San Francisco Board of Supervisors (2011–2019)

== Party officials ==
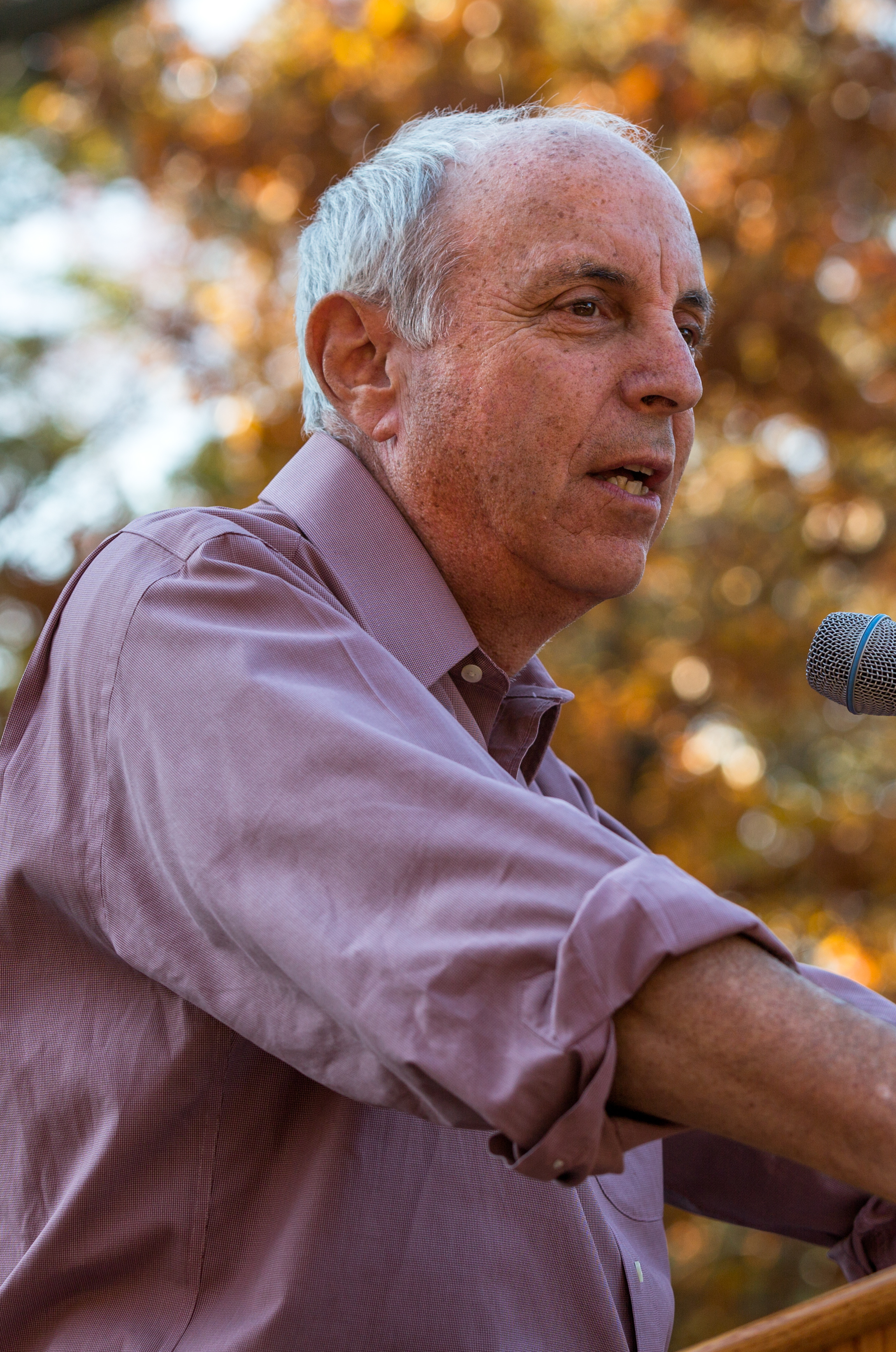
Larry Cohen

=== DNC members ===
==== Current ====
- Larry Cohen, DC, union leader and CWA president
- Michelle Deatrick, MI, chair and founder, DNC Environment and Climate Crisis Council, vice chair of Washtenaw County Commission
- Megan E. Green, DNC member from Missouri
- Ray McKinnon, DNC member from North Carolina
- Susie A. Shannon, DNC member from California
- Jeri D. Shepherd, DNC member from Colorado
- Yasmine P. Taeb, DNC member from Virginia, human rights attorney, senior policy counsel at the Center for Victims of Torture
- Terry L. Tucker, DNC member from Colorado
- Curtis Wylde, DNC member from Missouri
- James Zogby, DC, founder and president of Arab American Institute

==== Former ====
- Derek Eadon, chair of the Iowa Democratic Party (2017) (previously endorsed Julian Castro)

=== Other party officials ===
- Arun Chaudhary, political operative and filmmaker
- Peter Daou, former strategist for Hillary Clinton, John Kerry and Arlen Specter
- Faiz Shakir, political aide and 2020 campaign manager
- Brianna Westbrook, Arizona Democratic Party vice chair and candidate for Arizona's 8th congressional district in 2018

== International politicians ==
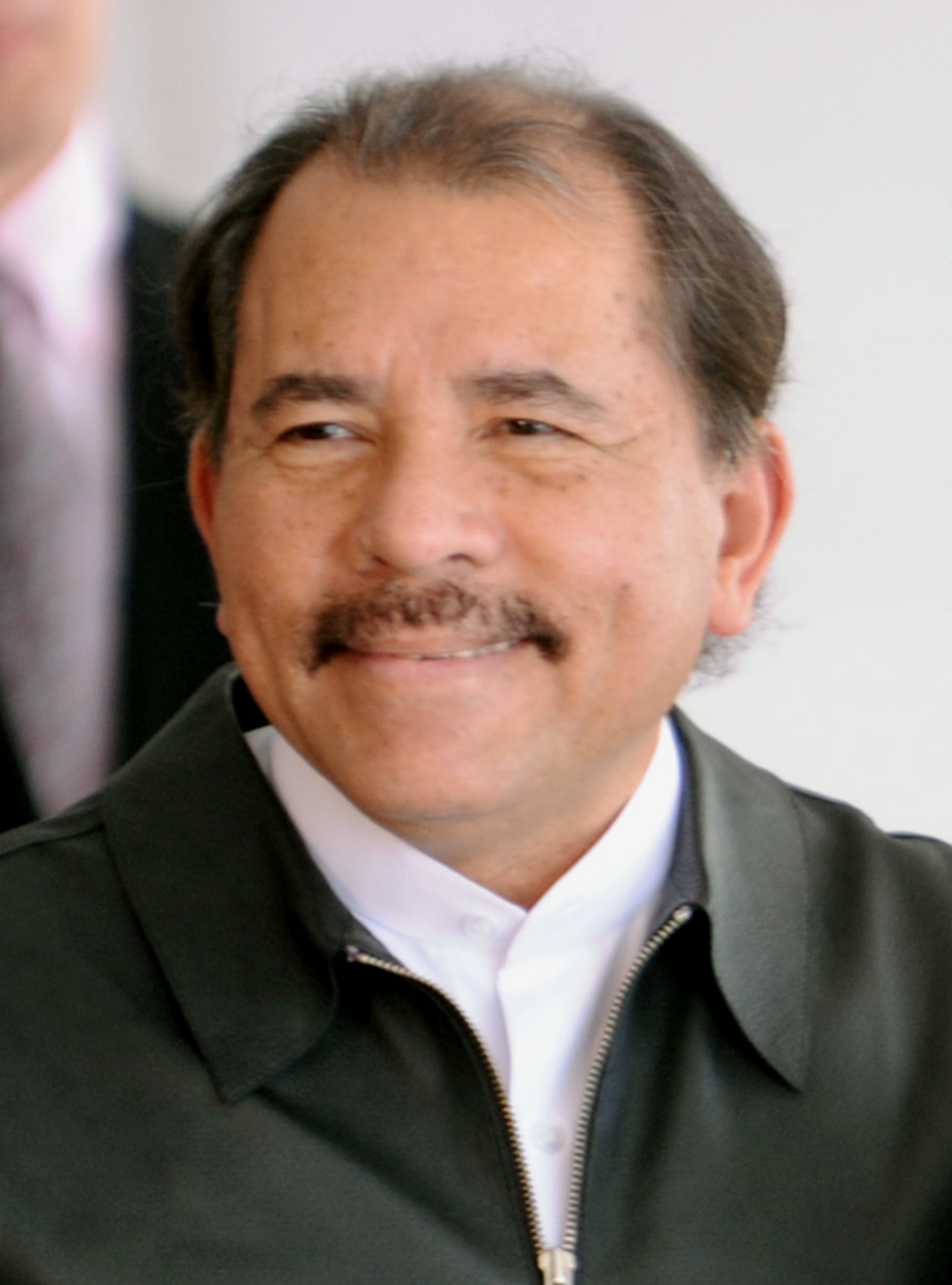
Daniel Ortega

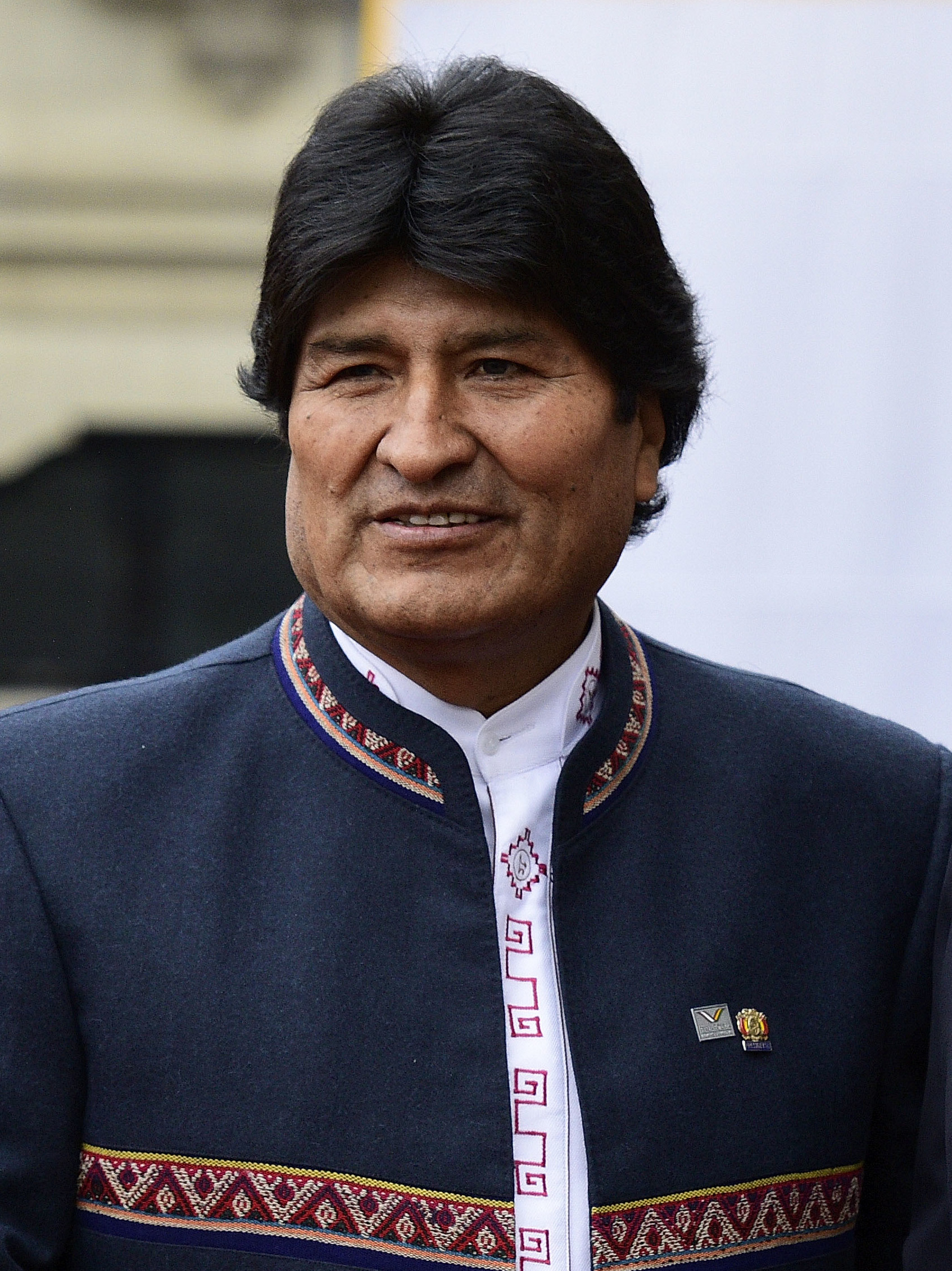
Evo Morales

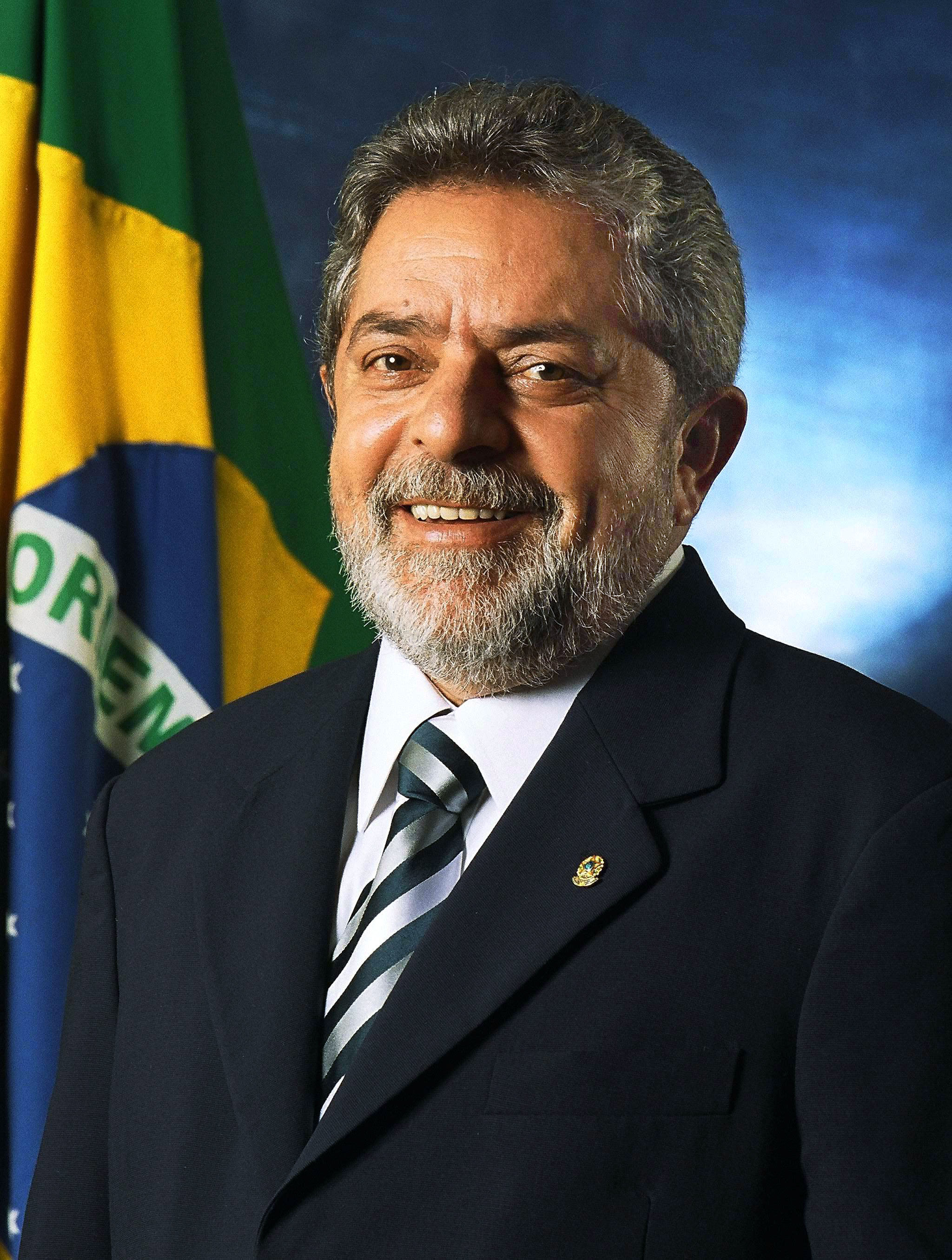
Luiz Inácio Lula da Silva

=== Heads of state and government ===
==== Current ====
- Daniel Ortega, president of Nicaragua (1985–1990, 2007–present) (FSLN)

==== Former ====
- Rafael Correa, president of Ecuador (2007–2017) (PAIS)
- Luiz Inácio Lula da Silva, president of Brazil (2003–2010, 2023-present) (PT)
- Evo Morales, president of Bolivia (2006–2019) (MAS-IPSP)

=== Members of national and supranational parliaments ===
==== Current ====
- Diane Abbott, Labour member of the British Parliament for Hackney North and Stoke Newington (1987–present), shadow home secretary (2016–2020)
- Niki Ashton, New Democrat member of the Canadian House of Commons for Churchill—Keewatinook Aski (2008–2025)
- Richard Burgon, Labour member of the British Parliament for Leeds East (2015–present), shadow secretary of state for justice (2016–2020)
- Dan Carden, Labour member of the British Parliament for Liverpool Walton (2017–present), shadow secretary of state for international development (2018–2020)
- Martin Kolberg, Labour member of the Norwegian Parliament for Buskerud (2009–present)
- Stefan Liebich, Left member of the German Bundestag for Berlin-Mitte (2009–present)
- Audun Lysbakken, Socialist Left Party member of the Norwegian Parliament for Hordaland and leader of the Socialist Left Party
- John McDonnell, Labour member of the British Parliament for Hayes and Harlington (1997–present) and shadow chancellor of the exchequer (2015–2020)
- Jean-Luc Mélenchon, La France Insoumise member of the French National Assembly for Bouches-du-Rhône's 4th constituency (2017–2022)
- Ali Milani, Labour councillor and 2019 United Kingdom general election parliamentary candidate for Uxbridge and South Ruislip, the constituency of Prime Minister Boris Johnson
- Gustavo Petro, Humane Colombia member of the Senate of Colombia (2018–2022), mayor of Bogotá (2012–2015) and candidate in the 2010 and 2018 Colombian presidential election
- Jonas Sjöstedt, Left member of the Swedish Riksdag for Västerbotten (2010–2020) and leader of the Left Party of Sweden (2012–2020)
- Håkan Svenneling, Left member of the Swedish Riksdag for Värmland County (2014–present)
- Bastiaan van Apeldoorn, Socialist member of the Dutch Senate (2015–present)
- Yanis Varoufakis, leader of MeRA25, member of the Hellenic Parliament for Thessaloniki A (2015, 2019–2023), economist, former finance minister and author

==== Former ====
- Nessa Childers, Independent member of the European Parliament from Dublin (2009–2019)
- Giuseppe Civati, Democratic member of the Italian Chamber of Deputies (2013–2018), founder of Possible
- Laura Pidcock, Labour member of the British Parliament for North West Durham (2017–2019), shadow minister for Labour (2018–2019)
- Rui Tavares, Left Bloc and independent member of the European Parliament from Portugal (2009–2014), founder of LIVRE

=== Other international politicians ===
==== Current ====
- Ross Greer, Green member of the Scottish Parliament for West Scotland (2016–present)
- Richard Leonard, Labour member of the Scottish Parliament for Central Scotland (2016–present), Leader of the Scottish Labour Party (2017–2021)
- Gabriel Nadeau-Dubois, member of the National Assembly of Quebec for Gouin (2017–present) (spokesperson of Québec solidaire)
- Larry Sanders, Green Party of England and Wales health spokesperson (2016–present) (brother of Bernie Sanders)

== Notable individuals ==
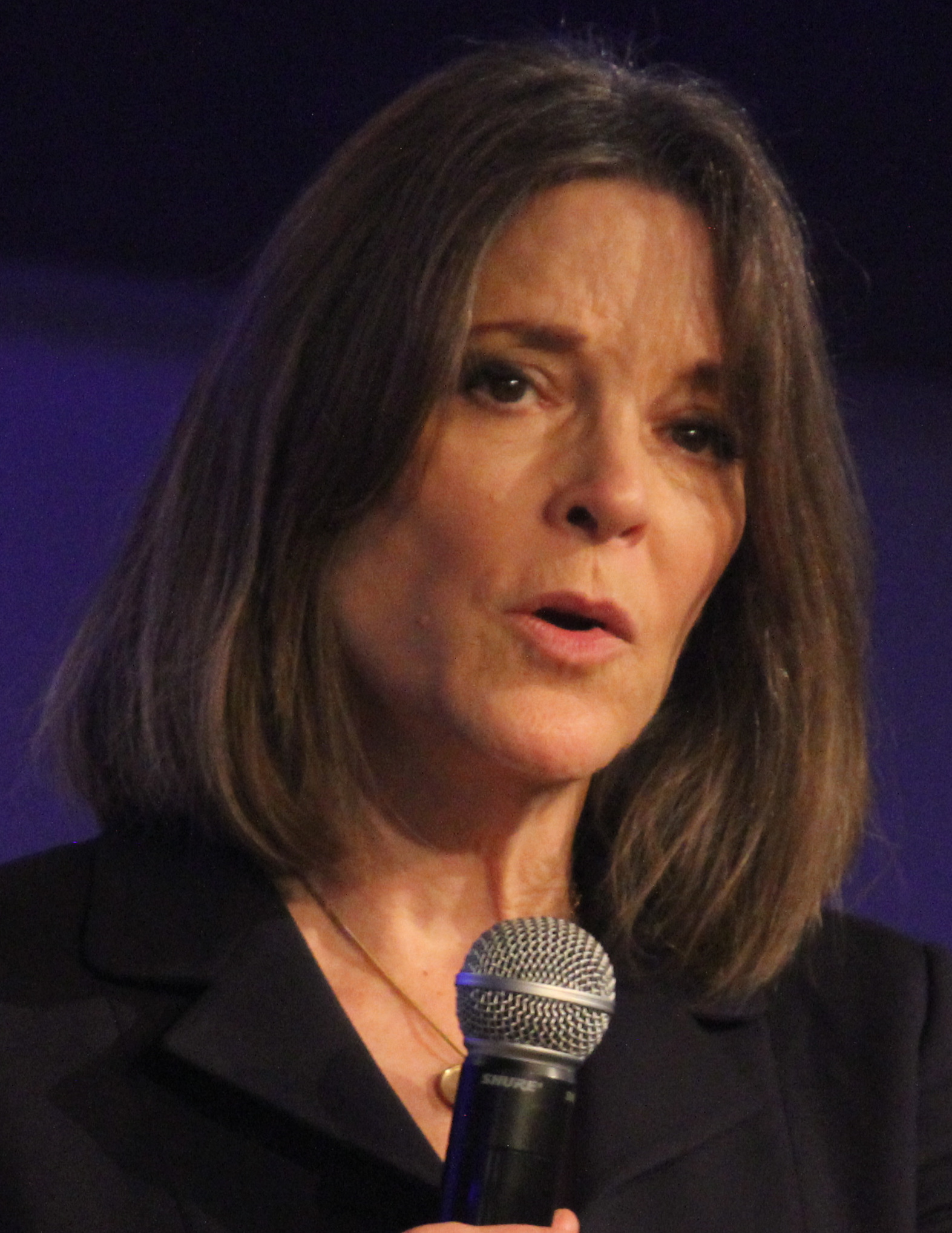
Marianne Williamson

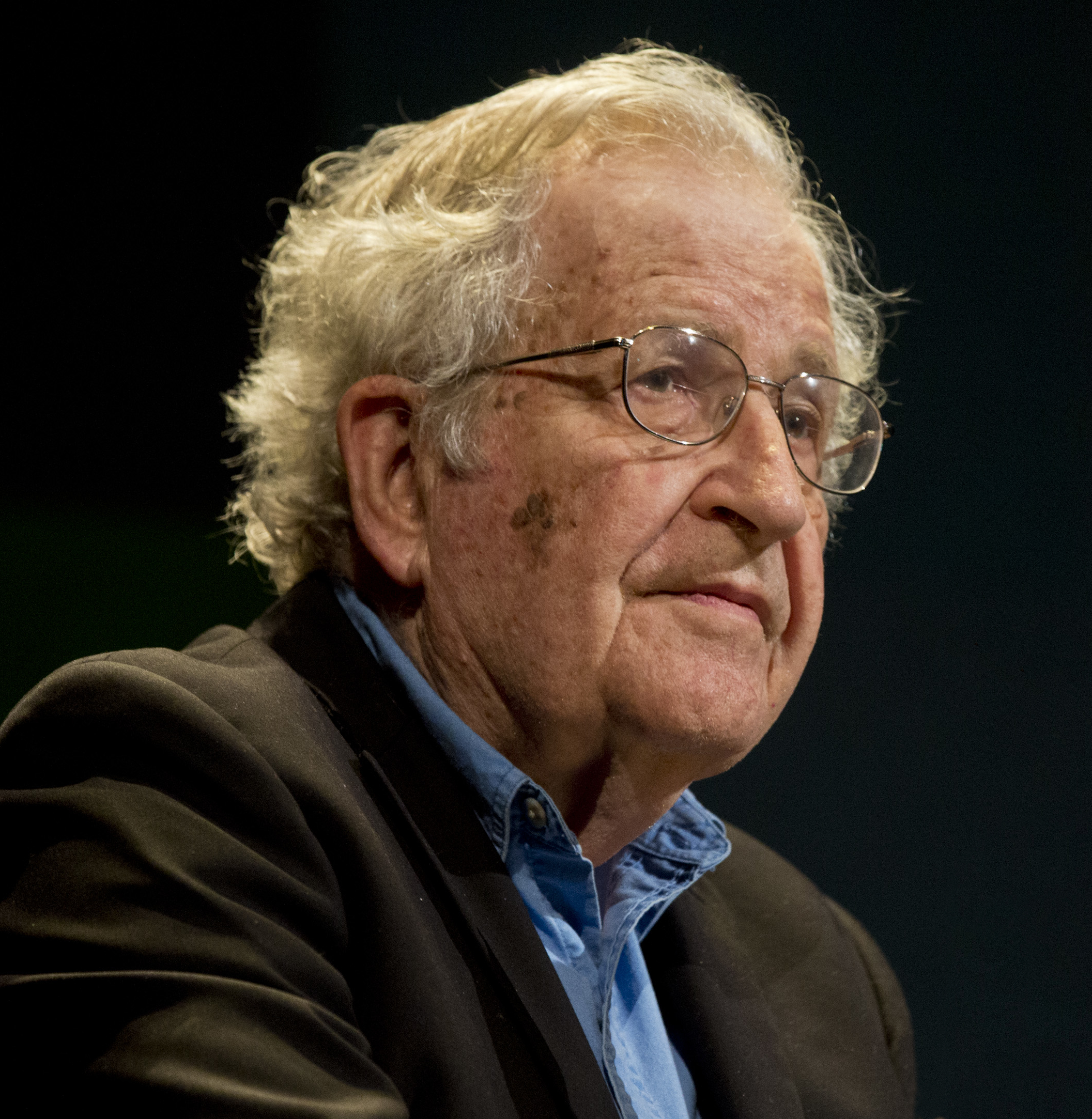
Noam Chomsky

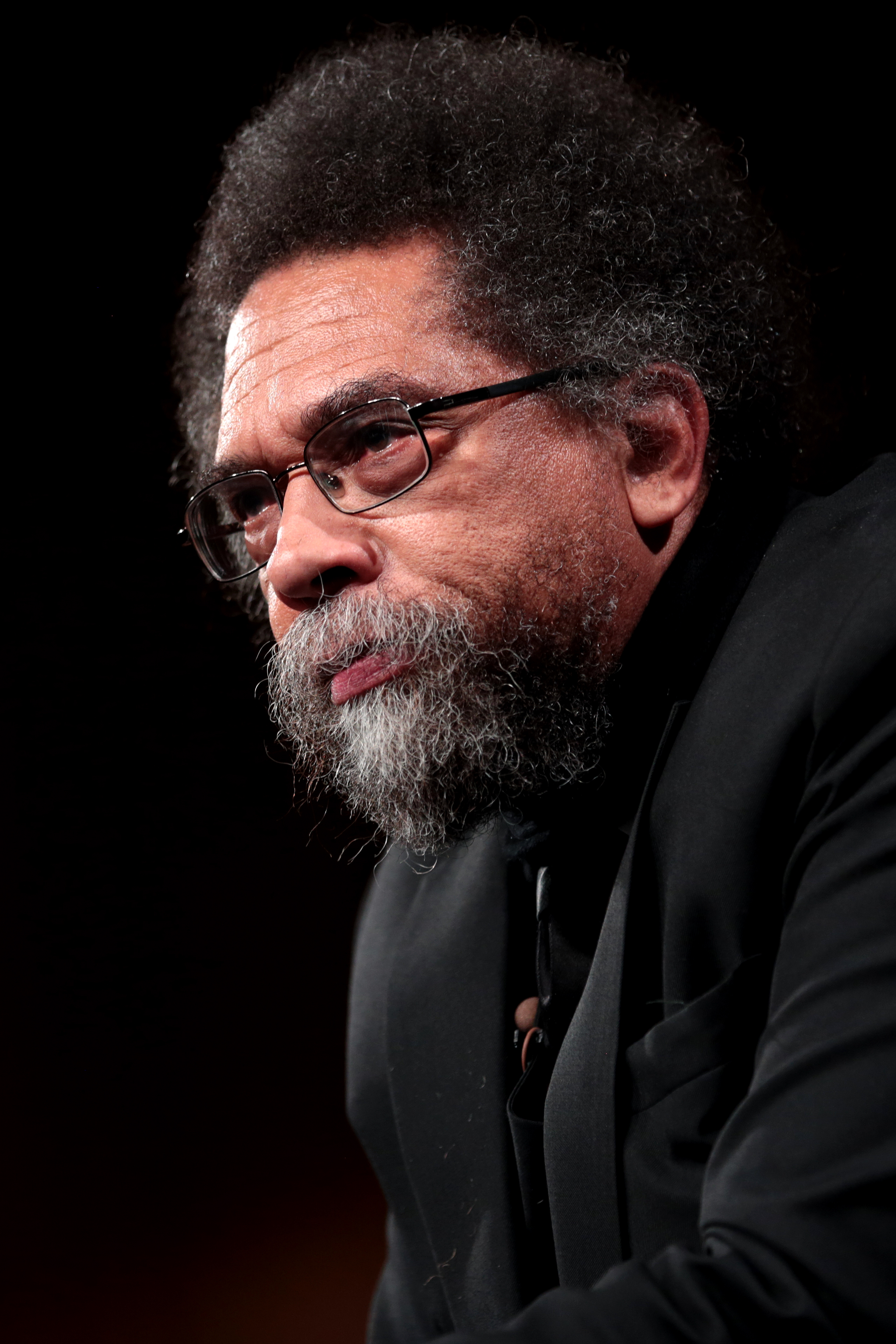
Cornel West

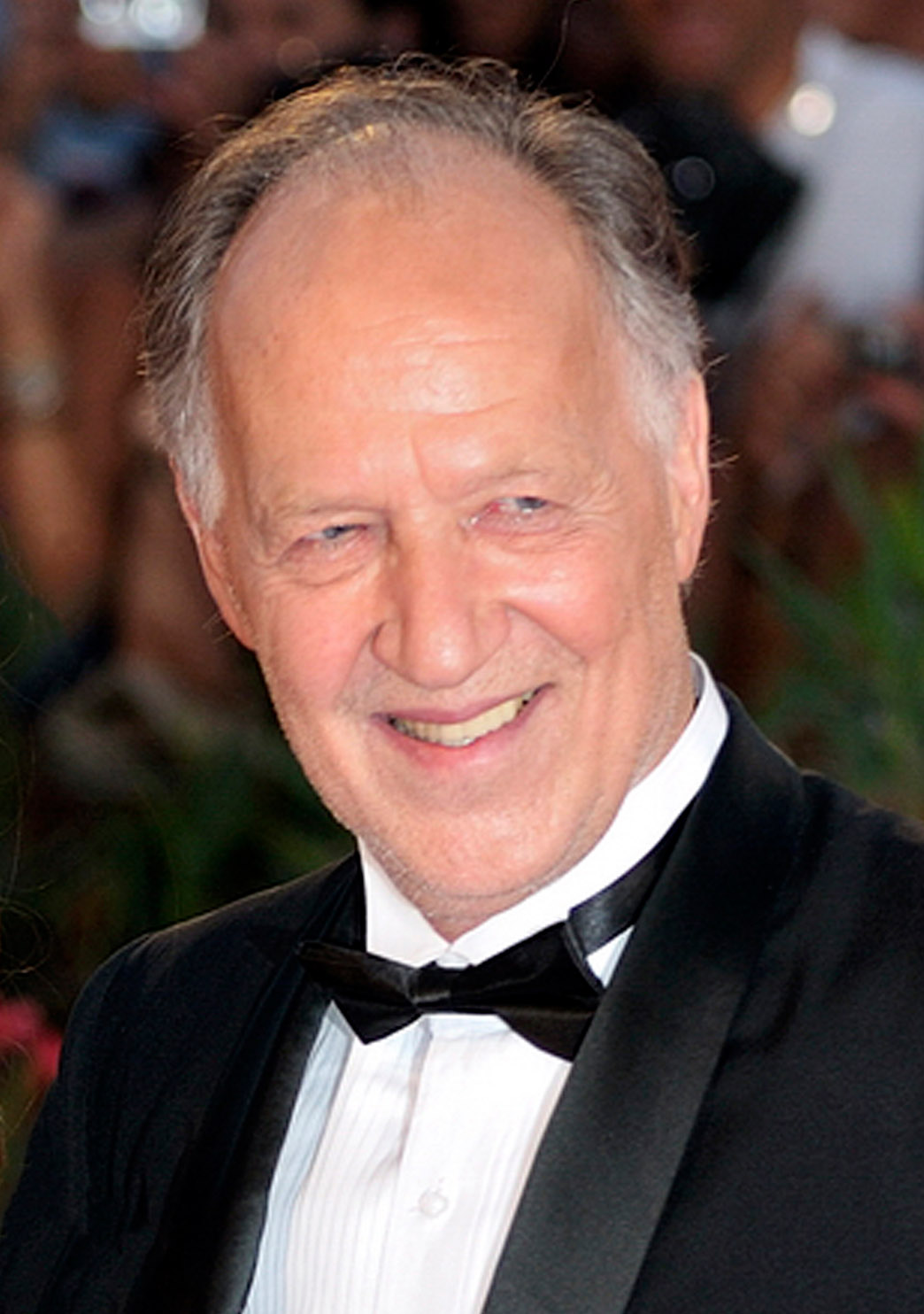
Werner Herzog

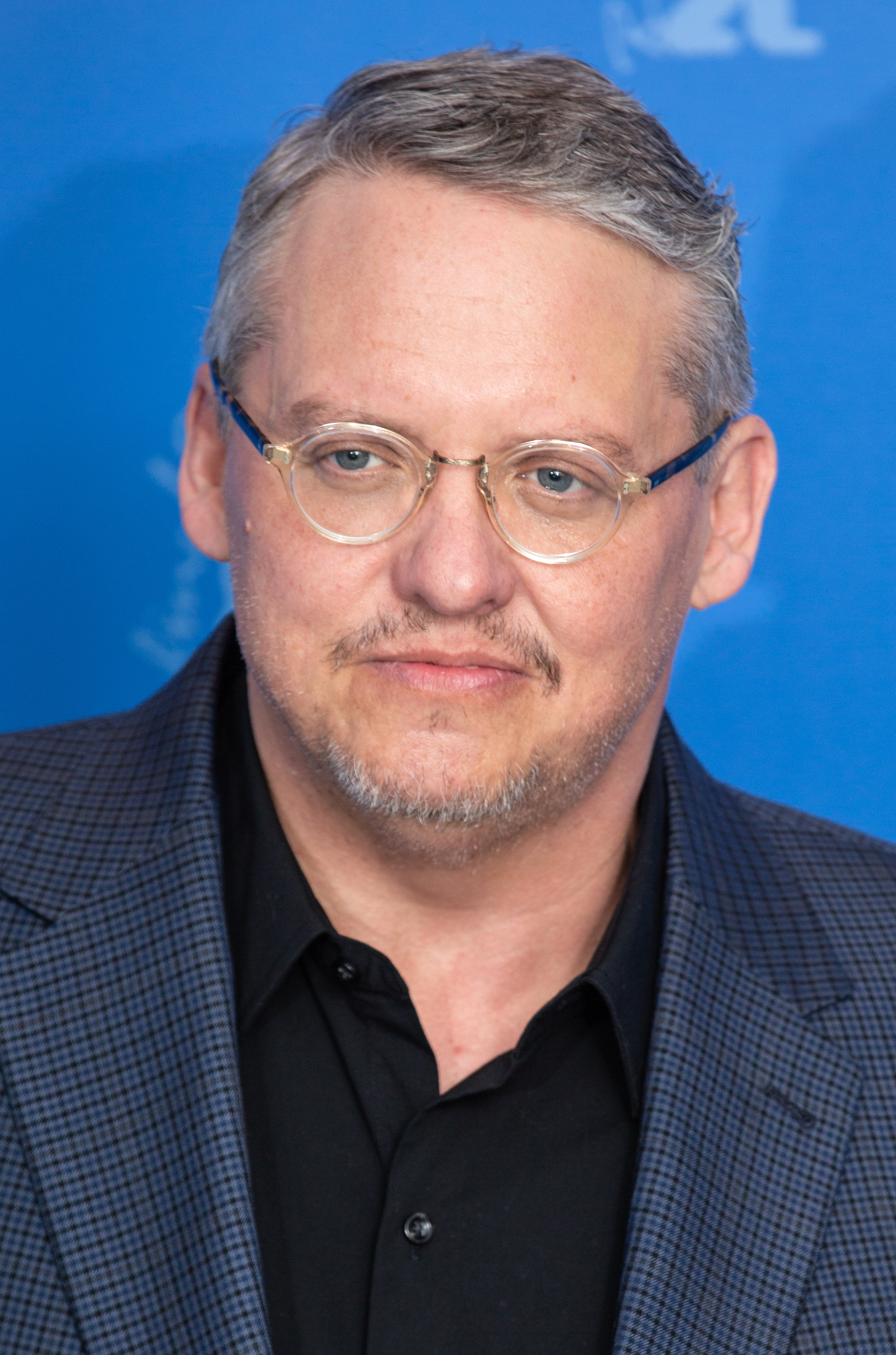
Adam McKay

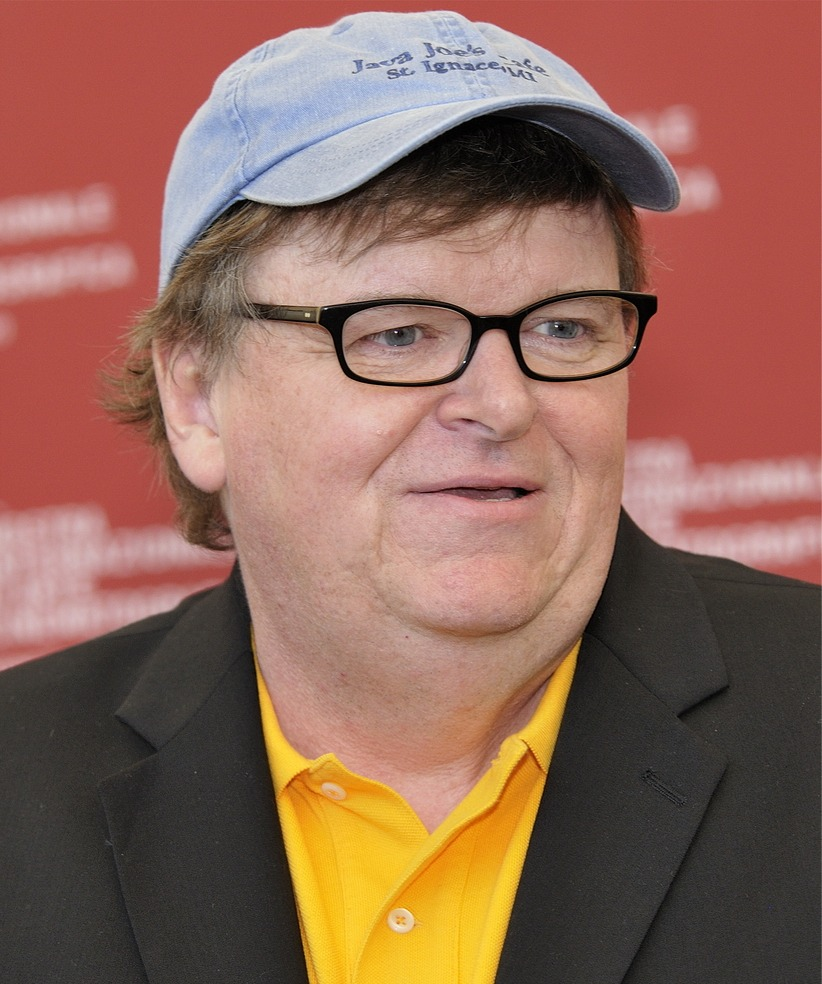
Michael Moore

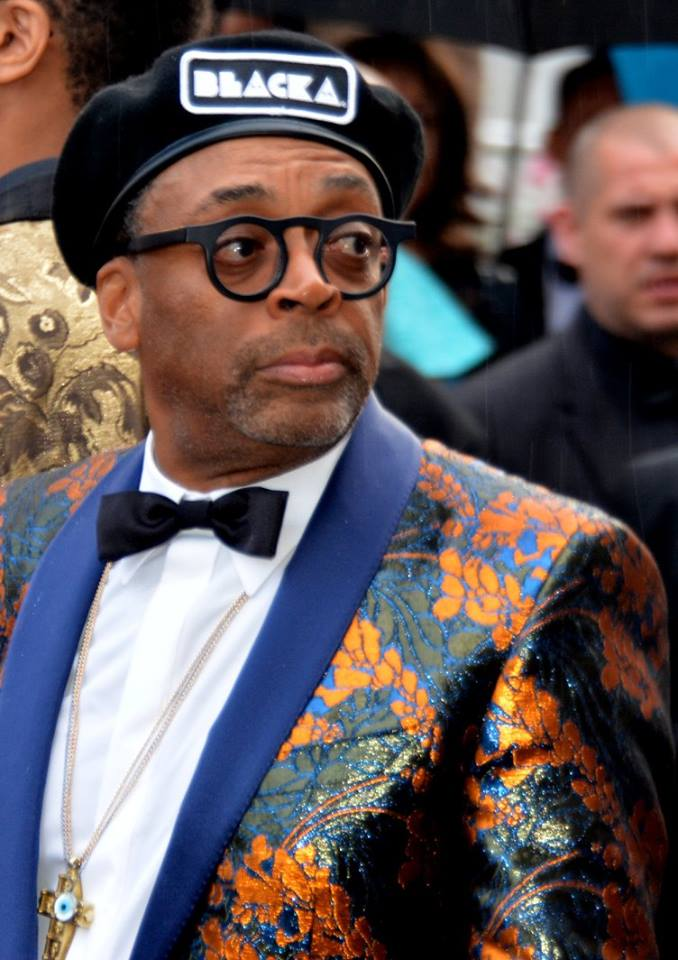
Spike Lee

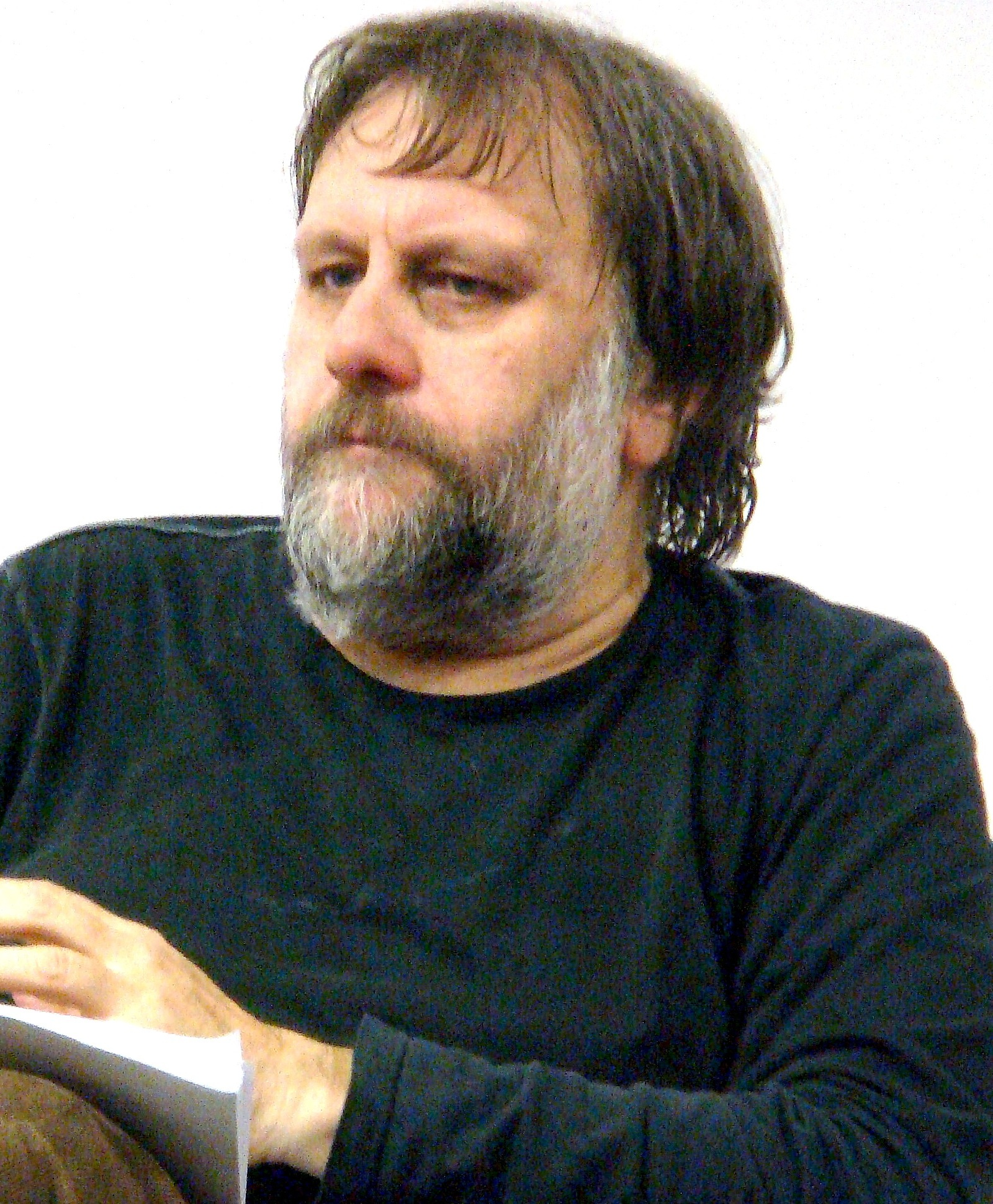
Slavoj Žižek

=== Activists, humanitarians, and labor leaders ===
- Ana Maria Archila, activist and executive director of the Center for Popular Democracy
- Ady Barkan, healthcare activist and attorney (previously endorsed Elizabeth Warren)
- Jabari Brisport, activist, actor, teacher, and Democratic candidate for New York State Senate's 25th District
- Randy Bryce, ironworker, activist, and Democratic nominee for U.S. representative from WI-01 in 2018
- Cori Bush, political activist, nurse, pastor, and former U.S. representative from MO-1 (2021–2025)
- Tiffany Cabán, candidate for Queens County District Attorney in 2019 and criminal justice reform activist
- Bonnie Castillo, executive director of National Nurses United and California Nurses Association/National Nurses Organizing Committee
- Charles R. Chamberlain, political leader and executive director at Democracy for America
- Rosa Clemente, community organiser, journalist, hip-hop activist, and Green Party of the United States vice-presidential nominee in 2008
- Patrisse Cullors, activist and co-founder of the Black Lives Matter movement (co-endorsement with Elizabeth Warren)
- Ryan Deitsch, gun control activist and March for Our Lives co-founder
- RoseAnn DeMoro, former executive director of NNU and CNA/NNOC
- Barbara Ehrenreich, political commentator and author
- Noura Erakat, legal scholar, human rights attorney, activist, and writer
- Jodie Evans, political activist, author, and documentary film producer
- George Goehl, executive director of People's Action
- Miss Major Griffin-Gracy, trans woman activist and community leader for transgender rights, Stonewall riots veteran, and former executive director of the Transgender Gender Variant Intersex Justice Project
- Isra Hirsi, environmental activist and co-founder and co-executive director of U.S. Youth Climate Strike (daughter of Ilhan Omar)
- Leah Hunt-Hendrix, activist, political theorist, and movement builder
- Ben Jealous, 2018 nominee for governor of Maryland, president and chief executive officer of the National Association for the Advancement of Colored People (2008–2013)
- Cameron Kasky, gun control activist and March for Our Lives co-founder (previously endorsed Andrew Yang)
- Bob King, union leader and former UAW president
- Shaun King, writer and civil rights activist
- Naomi Klein, author and activist
- Nomiki Konst, political activist
- José La Luz, labor activist
- Winona LaDuke, environmentalist, economist, writer, executive director of Honor the Earth, and Green Party of the United States vice-presidential nominee in 1996 and 2000
- Jamie Margolin, climate activist
- Jane F. McAlevey, union organizer, scholar, author, and political commentator
- Maurice Mitchell, activist, musician, and national director of the Working Families Party
- David Oks, political activist and campaign manager of Mike Gravel 2020 presidential campaign
- Carmen Perez, activist and national co-chair of the 2017 Women's March
- Varshini Prakash, environmental activist and founder and executive director of Sunrise Movement
- Qasim Rashid, political activist and Democratic candidate for Virginia's 28th Senate district in 2019 and Virginia's 1st congressional district in 2020
- Linda Sarsour, political activist and former executive director of Arab American Association of New York
- Azadeh N. Shahshahani, human rights attorney and former president of the National Lawyers Guild
- Barbara Smith, lecturer, author, scholar, lesbian feminist, and socialist
- Richard Stallman, founder of GNU Project and Free Software Foundation
- Paula Jean Swearengin, social and environmental activist and Democratic candidate for U.S. Senate from West Virginia (2018, 2020)
- Delaney Tarr, gun control activist and March for Our Lives co-founder
- Jonathan Tasini, former president of National Writers Union
- Henry Williams, political activist and chief of staff of Mike Gravel 2020 presidential campaign
- Marianne Williamson, spiritual leader, author, political activist, and 2020 presidential candidate
- Eddy Zheng, immigrant and criminal justice activist and youth counselor

=== Journalists and commentators ===
- Elizabeth Bruenig, writer and commentator
- Matt Bruenig, lawyer, blogger, policy analyst, commentator, and founder of the left-wing think tank People's Policy Project
- Aya de Leon, novelist, hip-hop theater and spoken-word artist, and professor at the University of California Berkeley
- Laura Flanders, broadcast journalist
- Glenn Greenwald, Pulitzer Prize-winning journalist and founder of The Intercept
- Ana Kasparian, main-host and producer at The Young Turks
- Rania Khalek, journalist and political activist
- Abby Martin, journalist and TV presenter
- Paul Mason, commentator and radio personality
- Chirlane McCray, editor, poet, and First Lady of New York City (2014–present)
- John Nichols, journalist and writer
- Hasan Piker, Twitch streamer and political commentator
- Nathan J. Robinson, editor-in-chief of Current Affairs
- Sarah Schulman, novelist, playwright, gay activist, AIDS historian, Distinguished Professor of the Humanities at College of Staten Island, fellow at the New York Institute for the Humanities, and recipient of the Bill Whitehead Award
- Sam Seder, journalist, political commentator, and comedian
- David Sirota, political commentator, radio host, and 2020 campaign advisor and speechwriter
- Beverly Smith, writer, feminist, health advocate, instructor of Women's Health at the University of Massachusetts Boston, and author and member of the Combahee River Collective (twin sister of Barbara Smith)
- Norman Solomon, journalist, media critic, antiwar activist
- Bhaskar Sunkara, editor and publisher of Jacobin
- Mark Thompson, newscaster, anchor, and activist
- Opal Tometi, writer, human rights activist, strategist, community organizer, and co-founder of Black Lives Matter
- Cenk Uygur, co-host and founder of The Young Turks, co-founder of Justice Democrats, founder of Wolf PAC, candidate for California's 25th congressional district in 2020
- Antonia Zerbisias, journalist

=== Businesspeople ===
- Ben Cohen, co-founder of Ben & Jerry's and 2020 national co-chair
- Jerry Greenfield, co-founder of Ben & Jerry's
- Prabal Gurung, fashion designer
- Christine Hallquist, former CEO of Vermont Electric Cooperative and 2018 nominee for governor of Vermont
- Adriel Hampton, digital media, fundraising, and organizing entrepreneur, strategist for political campaigns, and 2022 candidate for governor of California
- Joe Sanberg, entrepreneur and investor, co-founder of Aspiration, Inc.
- Michael Sayman, app creator

=== Scholars and academics ===
- Melina Abdullah, civic leader, chair of Pan-African Studies Department at California State University, Los Angeles, and co-founder of the L.A. chapter of Black Lives Matter
- Abdul Alkalimat, professor of African-American studies and library and information science at the University of Illinois at Urbana–Champaign
- Eduardo Bonilla-Silva, professor of sociology at Duke University, former President of the American Sociological Association
- Hazel Carby, Charles C & Dorathea S Dilley Professor of African American Studies & American Studies at Yale University
- Noam Chomsky, linguist, philosopher, cognitive scientist, historian, social critic, and institute professor emeritus at MIT
- Carole Boyce Davies, professor, author, scholar, and Professor of English and Africana Studies at Cornell University
- Dána-Ain Davis, professor of Urban Studies at Queens College, City University of New York (CUNY)
- Norman Finkelstein, political scientist, activist, and Israeli–Palestinian conflict and Holocaust scholar
- Nancy Fraser, philosopher, feminist theorist
- James K. Galbraith, economist and professor at The University of Texas at Austin
- Dayo Gore, African-American feminist scholar, professor of Ethnic Studies and Critical Gender Studies at the University of California, San Diego
- Nikhil Goyal, sociologist
- Darrick Hamilton, microeconomist, social scientist, and executive director of the Kirwan Institute for the Study of Race and Ethnicity at Ohio State University
- Michael Hanchard, political scientist, Gustave C. Kuemmerle Professor, and Chair of the Africana Studies Department at the University of Pennsylvania
- Kelly Lytle Hernández, historian, Thomas E. Lifka Chair in History at the UCLA, and MacArthur Fellowship recipient
- Marc Lamont Hill, academic, author, activist, television personality, and Steve Charles Chair in Media, Cities and Solutions at the College of Media and Education at Temple University
- Elizabeth Hinton, historian, professor in the Departments of History and African and African American Studies at Harvard University, and 2017 recipient of the Ralph Waldo Emerson Award
- Gerald Horne, historian, Moores Professor of History and African American Studies at the University of Houston
- Peter Kalmus, climate scientist, writer, and activist
- Harvey J. Kaye, historian and sociologist at the University of Wisconsin–Green Bay
- Robin Kelley, academic, Distinguished Professor and Gary B. Nash Endowed Chair in U.S. History at the University of California, Los Angeles, former Hamsworth Chair of American History at Oxford University (2009), and Guggenheim Fellowship recipient
- Stephanie Kelton, professor of public policy and economics at Stony Brook University
- Deborah E. McDowell, Alice Griffin Professor of English and director of the Carter G. Woodson Institute at the University of Virginia
- Mireille Miller-Young, associate professor of Feminist Studies, University of California, Santa Barbara
- Leith Mullings, author, anthropologist, former president of the American Anthropological Association (2011–2013), Distinguished Professor of Anthropology Emerita at the Graduate Center of City University of New York
- Mark Anthony Neal, author, commentator and academic, and James B. Duke Distinguished Professor of African American Studies at Duke University
- Margo Okazawa-Rey, feminist, activist, writer, founding member of the Combahee River Collective, Barbara Lee Distinguished Chair in Women's Leadership at Mills College, and professor emerita of San Francisco State University
- Barbara Ransby, writer, historian, and Distinguished Professor of African American Studies, Gender and Women's Studies and History at the University of Illinois at Chicago
- Adolph L. Reed Jr., political science professor at the University of Pennsylvania
- Russell J. Rickford, scholar, author, associate professor of history at Cornell University, and 2010 co-winner of the American Book Award
- Jeffrey Sachs, economics professor at Columbia University
- Jane O'Meara Sanders, 4th president of Burlington College, wife of Bernie Sanders
- Kesho Y. Scott, professor emerita, Grinnell College, and 1988 winner of the American Book Award
- Lester Spence, media commentator and professor of Political Science and Africana Studies at Johns Hopkins University
- Ramesh Srinivasan, professor at UCLA, founder of Digital Cultures Lab
- Sandra Steingraber, biologist and author
- Susan O'Neal Stryker, author, filmmaker, theorist, and professor of Gender and Women's Studies, former director of the Institute for LGBT Studies, and founder of the Transgender Studies Initiative at the University of Arizona
- Keeanga-Yamahtta Taylor, academic and writer
- Zephyr Teachout, attorney, author, professor at Fordham University, and candidate for New York State attorney general in 2018
- Cornel West, philosopher, political activist, and social critic
- George Yancy, philosopher and Samuel Candler Dobbs Professor of Philosophy at Emory University
- Slavoj Žižek, philosopher, researcher at the Department of Philosophy of the University of Ljubljana Faculty of Arts, and International director of the Birkbeck Institute for the Humanities of the University of London

=== Writers, filmmakers, and visual artists ===
- Laylah Ali, visual artist and professor of Art at Williams College
- Ed Atkins, video artist and poet
- Kader Attia, French-Algerian artist
- Kevin Beasley, artist
- Hannah Black, visual artist and writer
- Amy Sterling Casil, science fiction writer
- Bill Corbett, writer, performer, voice of Crow T. Robot
- Molly Crabapple, artist
- Aria Dean, critic, artist, and curator
- DIS, collaborative art project
- Nicole Eisenman, artist, Guggenheim Fellowship recipient, MacArthur Fellow and 2013 recipient of the Carnegie Prize
- Janiva Ellis, painter
- Eve Ensler, playwright, performer, feminist, activist, and author of The Vagina Monologues
- Lawrence Ferlinghetti, poet, artist, social activist, and founder of City Lights Booksellers & Publishers
- Josh Fox, film director and environmental activist
- Nan Goldin, photographer, winner of the Hasselblad Award in 2007, winner of the Edward MacDowell Medal in 2012, Commandeur of the Ordre des Arts et des Lettres
- Lawrence Abu Hamdan, sound artist and visual artist, 2019 joint recipient of the Turner Prize
- Werner Herzog, film director, screenwriter, author, and opera director
- EJ Hill, contemporary artist
- Jim Jarmusch, film director, screenwriter, actor, producer, editor, and composer
- Ken Jennings, game show contestant and author (co-endorsement with Elizabeth Warren)
- Christine Sun Kim, sound artist
- Porochista Khakpour, novelist and Twitter essayist
- Bouchra Khalili, visual artist
- Jeff Koons, artist and sculptor
- Chris Kraus, writer and filmmaker
- Rachel Kushner, writer and Guggenheim Fellowship recipient
- Spike Lee, film director, writer and actor
- Park McArthur, artist
- Ryan McGinley, photographer
- Adam McKay, film director, producer and screenwriter
- Aja Monet, poet, writer, lyricist and activist
- Michael Moore, documentary filmmaker and author
- Carlos Motta, artist
- Daron Nefcy, writer, producer, animator
- Shailja Patel, Kenyan poet, playwright, theatre artist, and political activist
- Sondra Perry, artist
- Ariana Reines, poet, playwright, performance artist and translator
- Martha Rosler, visual artist, photographer and essayist
- Cameron Rowland, visual artist and MacArthur Fellow
- Jacolby Satterwhite, visual artist
- Shaun Scott, filmmaker, activist, and 2019 candidate for Seattle City Council
- Hito Steyerl, filmmaker, visual artist, writer, professor at the Berlin University of the Arts
- Diamond Stingily, artist and poet
- Astra Taylor, documentary filmmaker, writer, activist and musician
- Steven Thrasher, writer, editor, and faculty member of Northwestern University’s Medill School of Journalism
- Mayday Trippe, comic book artist and illustrator
- Wu Tsang, filmmaker, visual artist, performance artist and MacArthur Fellow
- Amalia Ulman, visual artist, performance artist and conceptual artist
- Kara Walker, visual artist and film-maker, member of the American Academy of Arts and Letters
- Leilah Weinraub, filmmaker, conceptual artist, and former CEO of fashion brand Hood By Air
- Agustina Woodgate, artist
- Anicka Yi, conceptual artist

== Celebrities ==
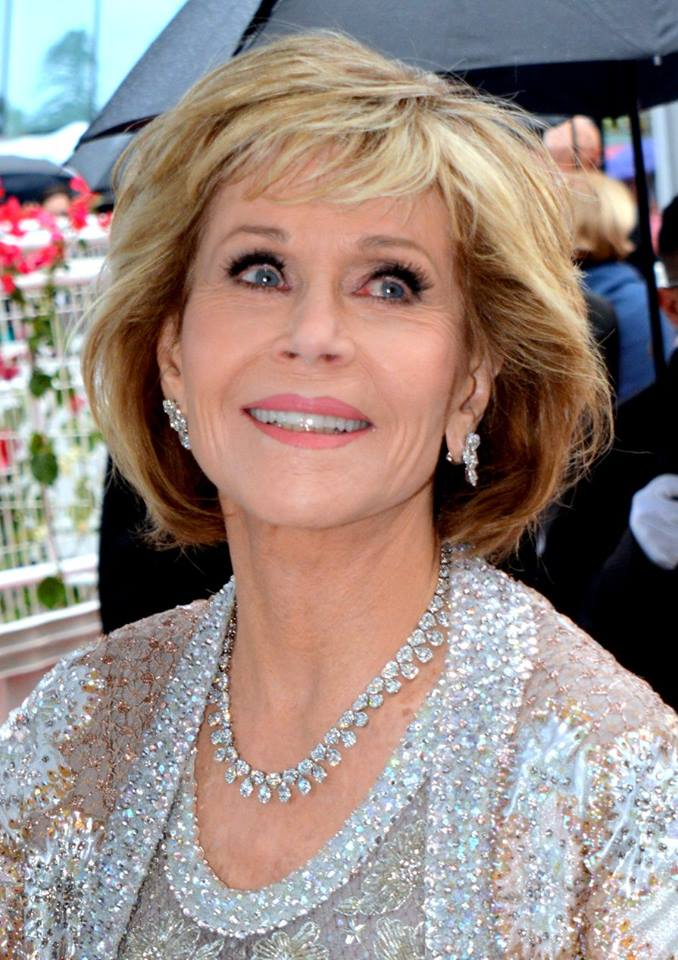
Jane Fonda

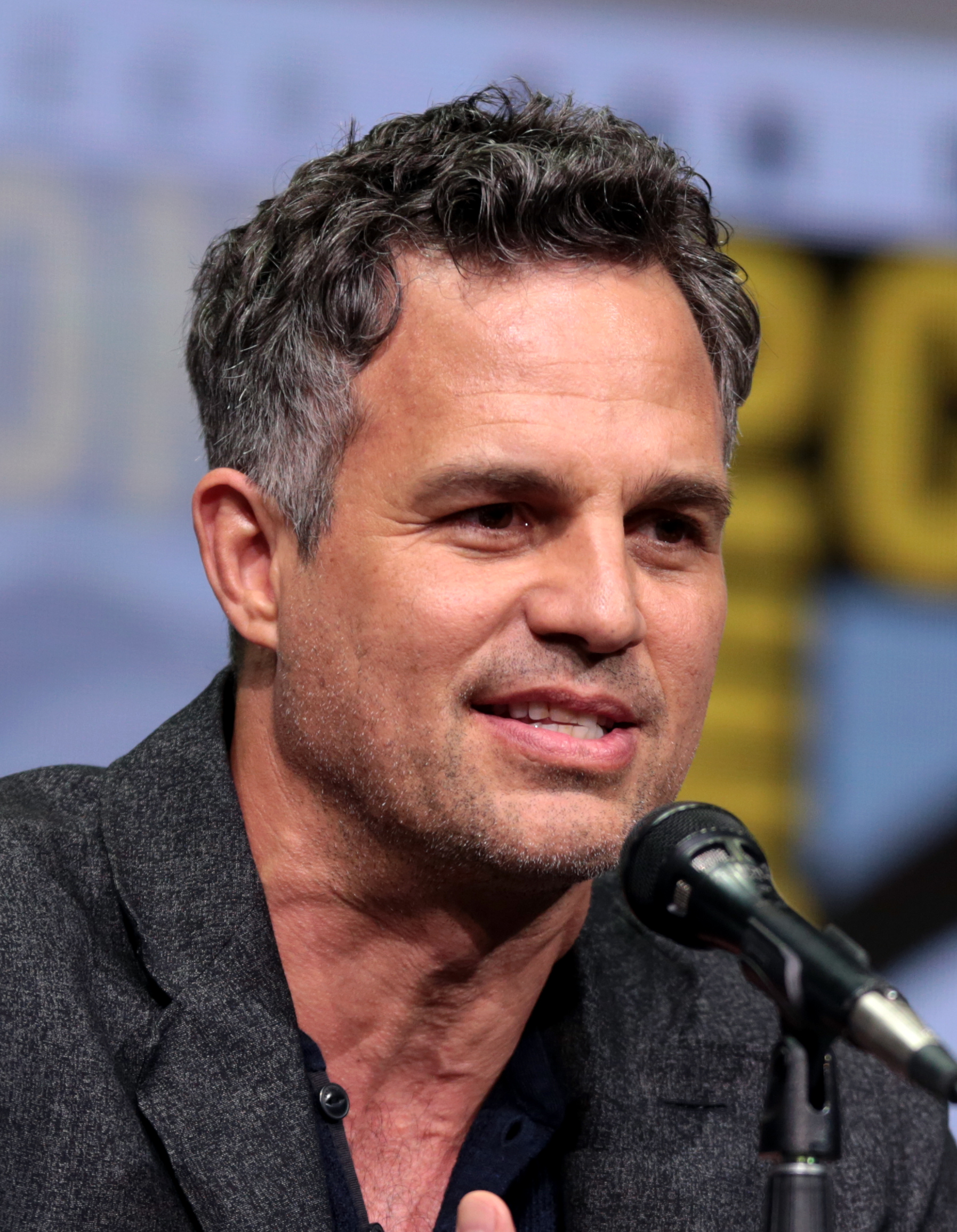
Mark Ruffalo

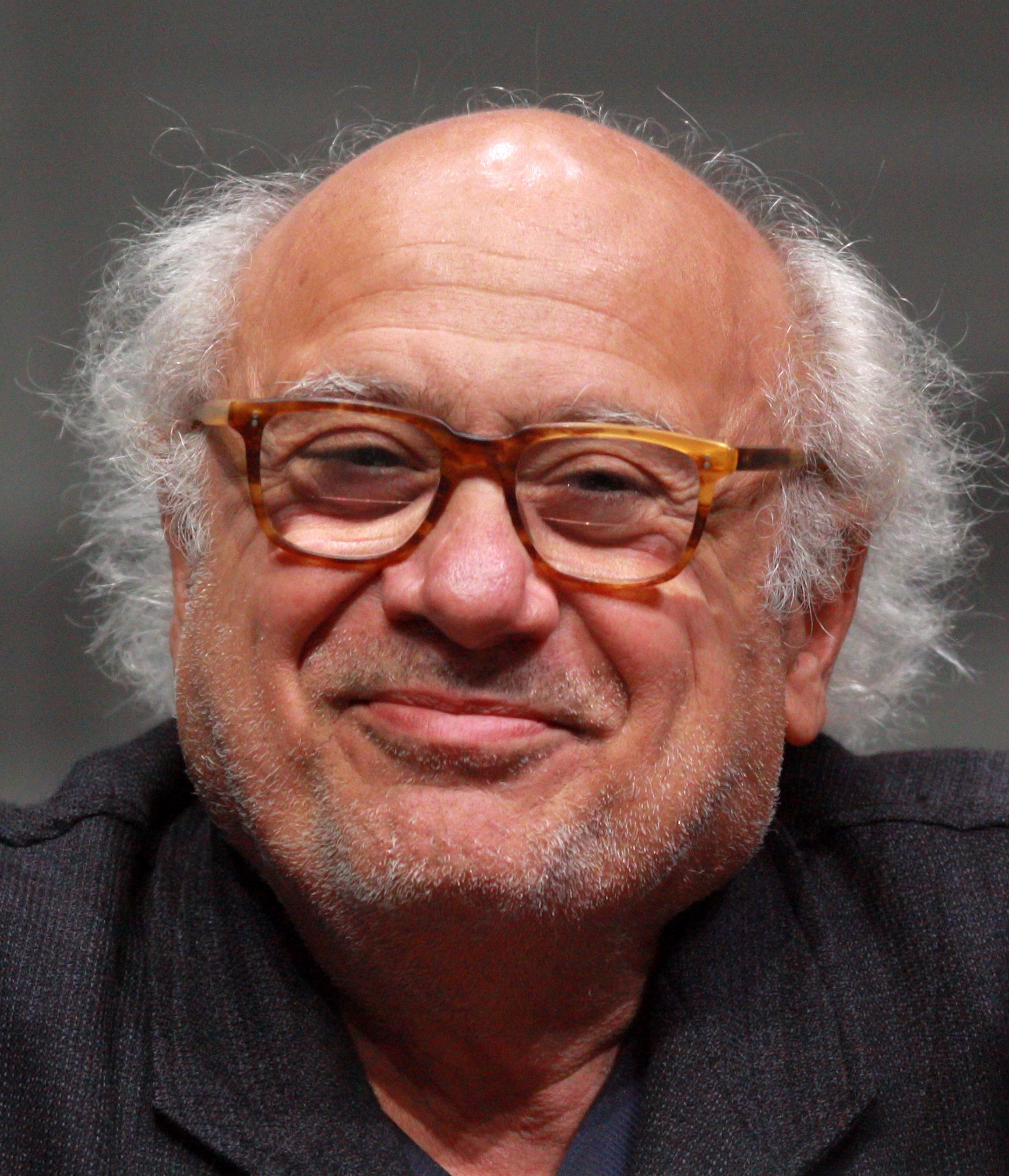
Danny DeVito

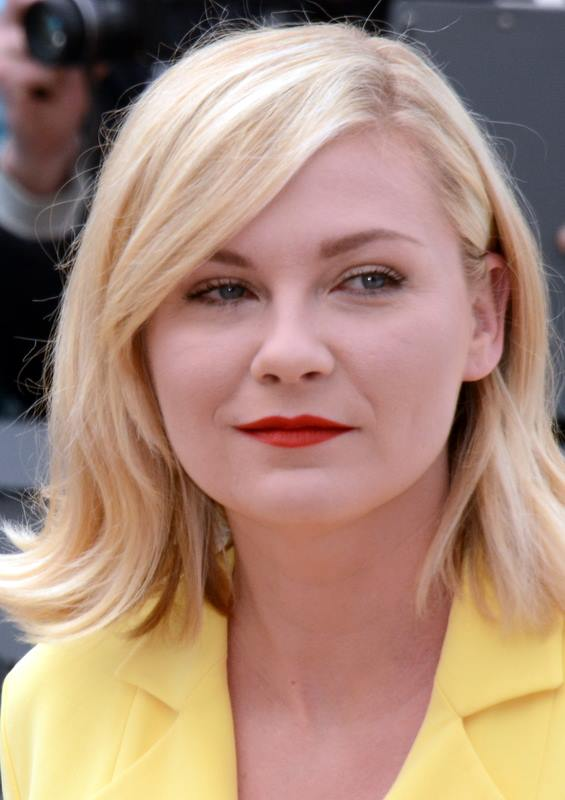
Kirsten Dunst

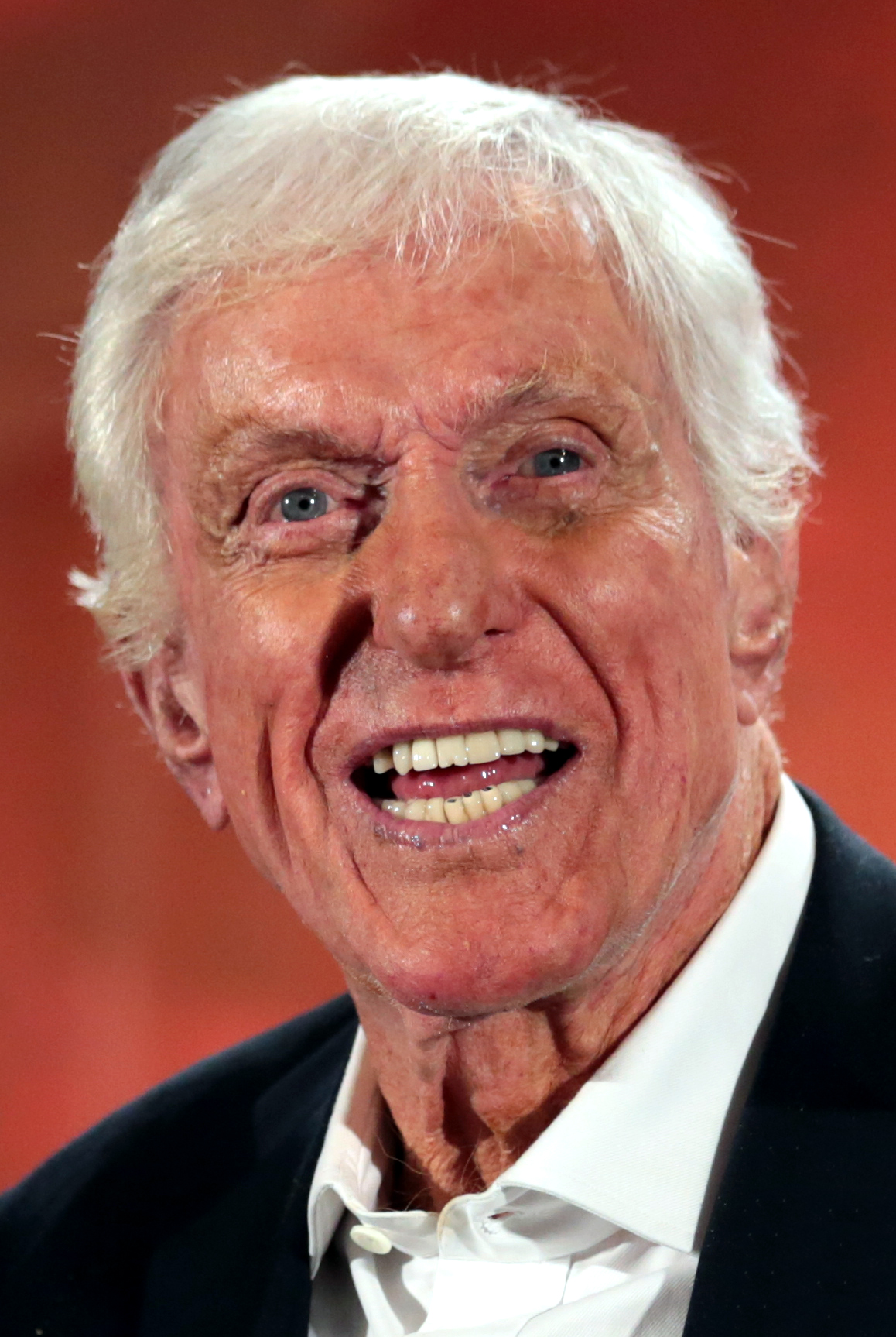
Dick Van Dyke

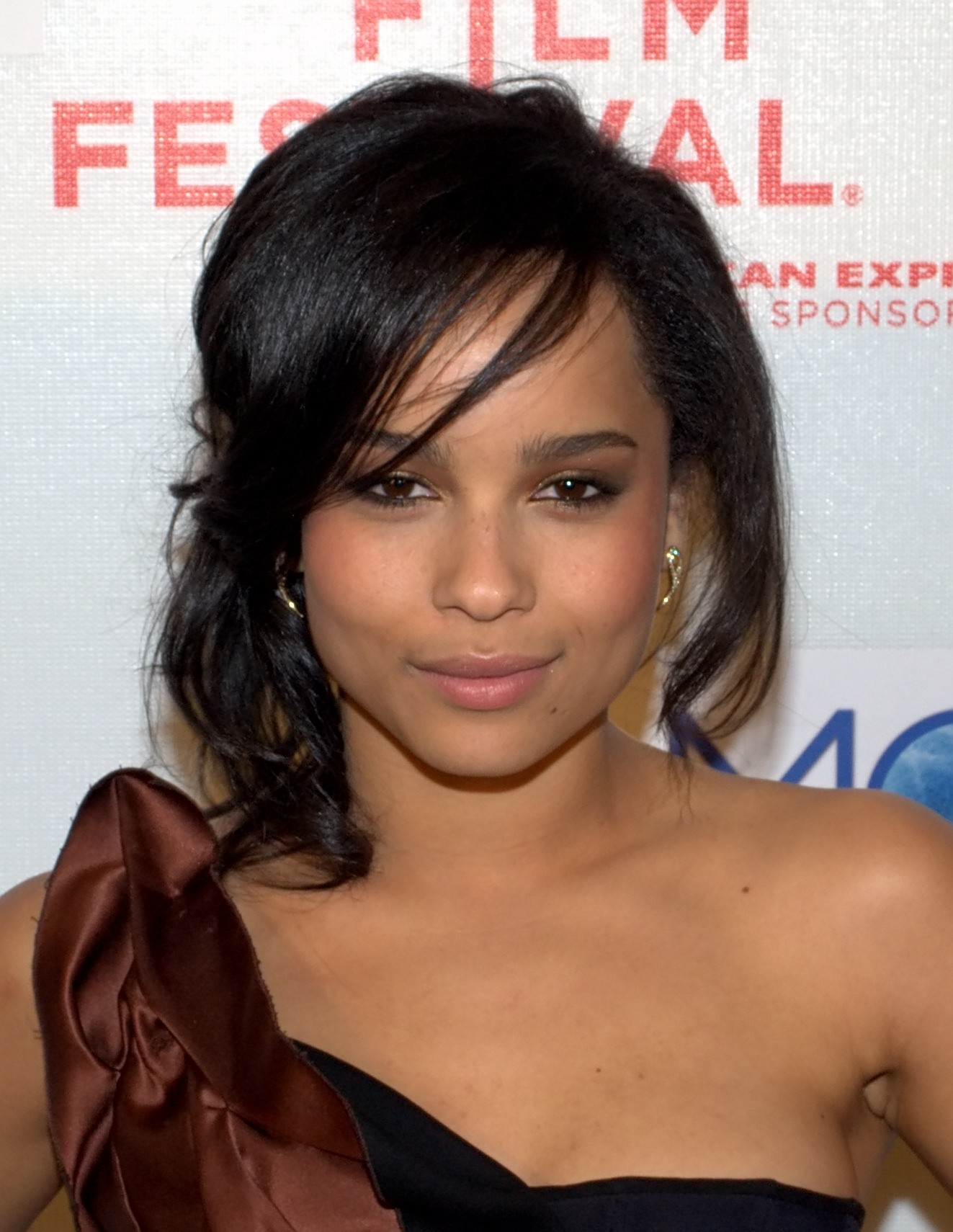
Zoë Kravitz

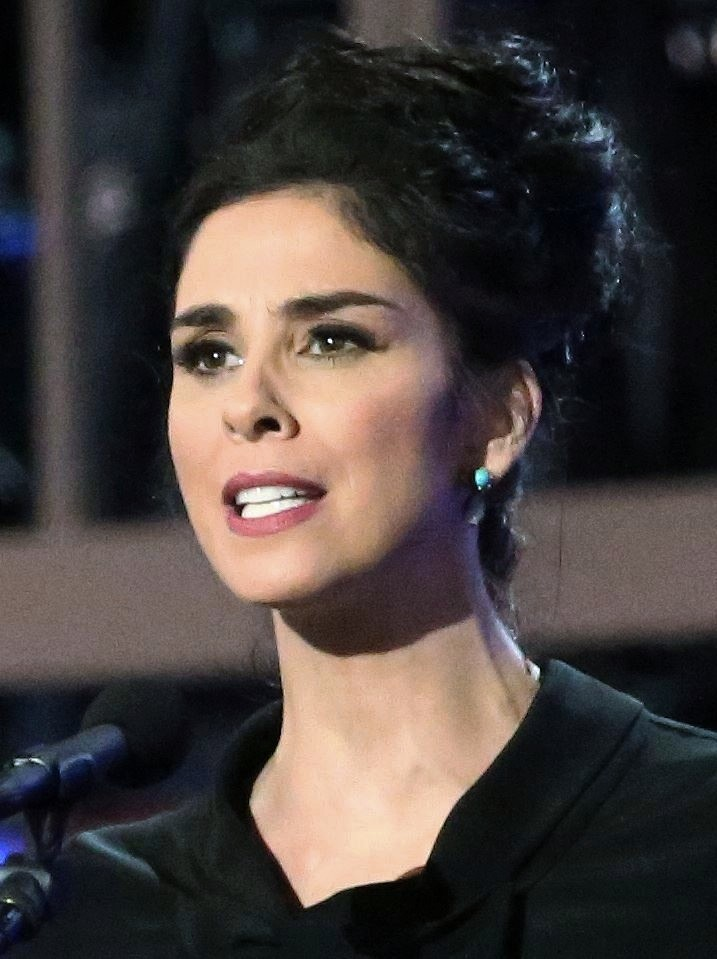
Sarah Silverman

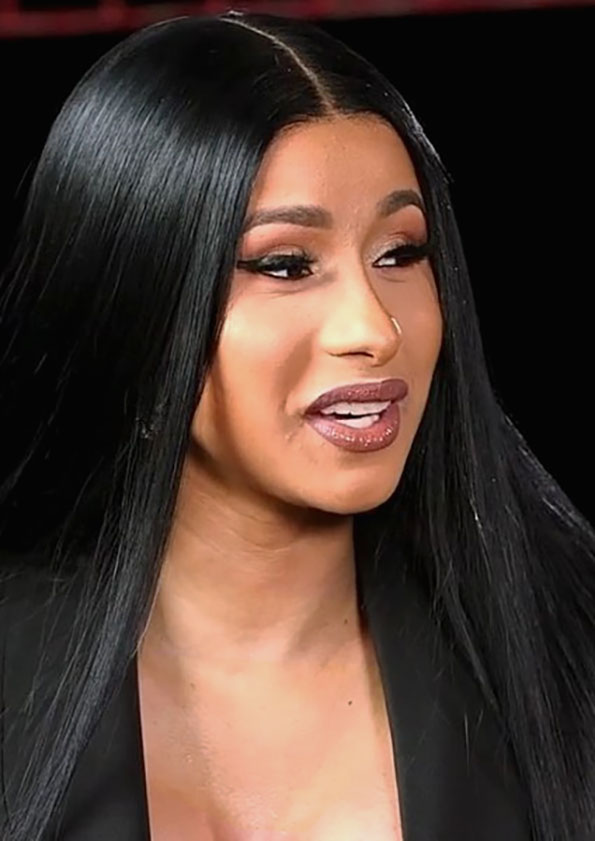
Cardi B

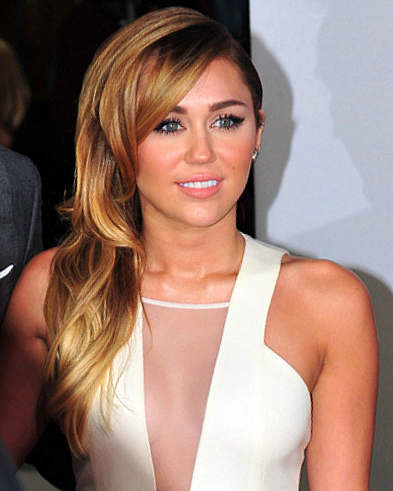
Miley Cyrus

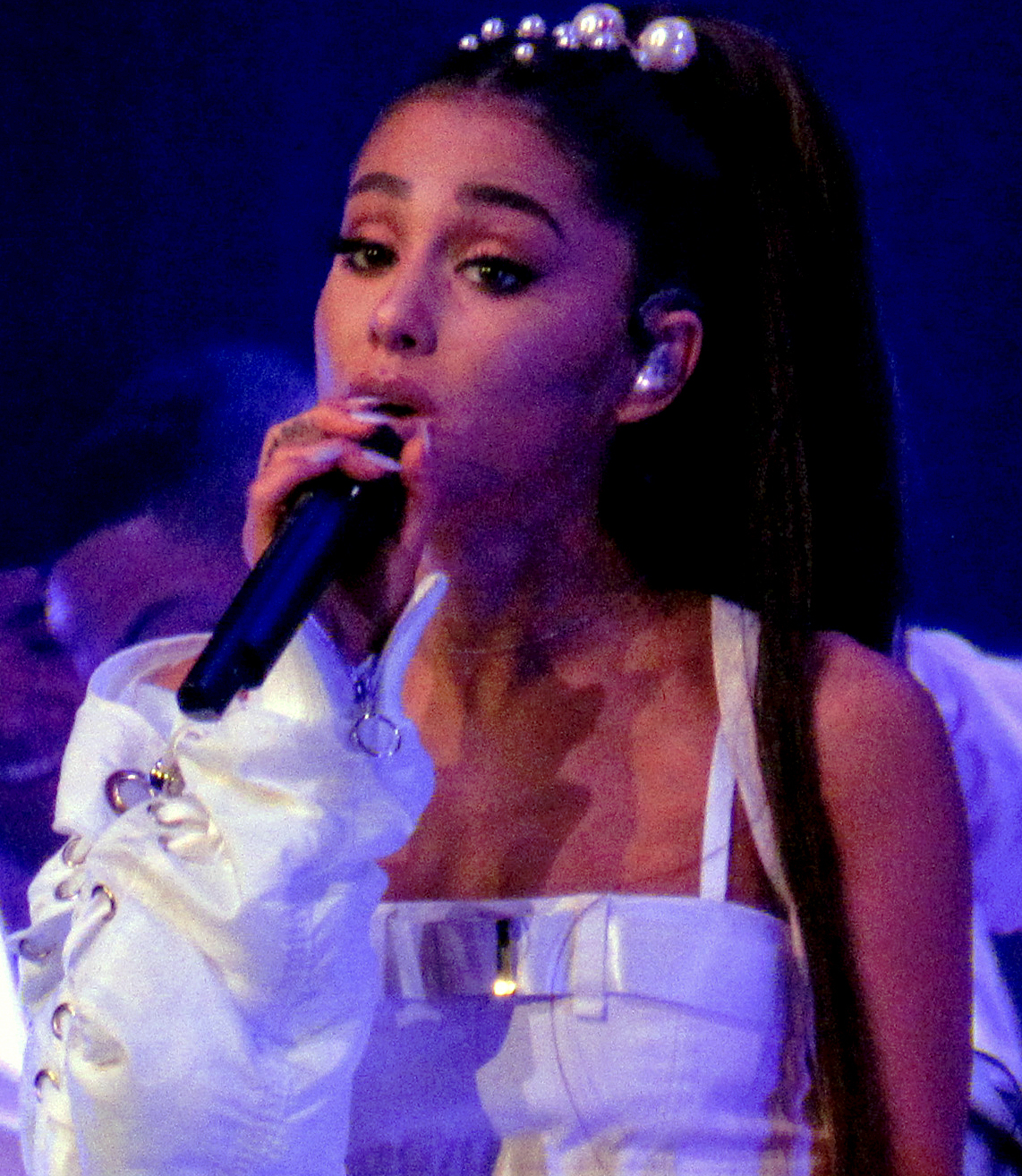
Ariana Grande

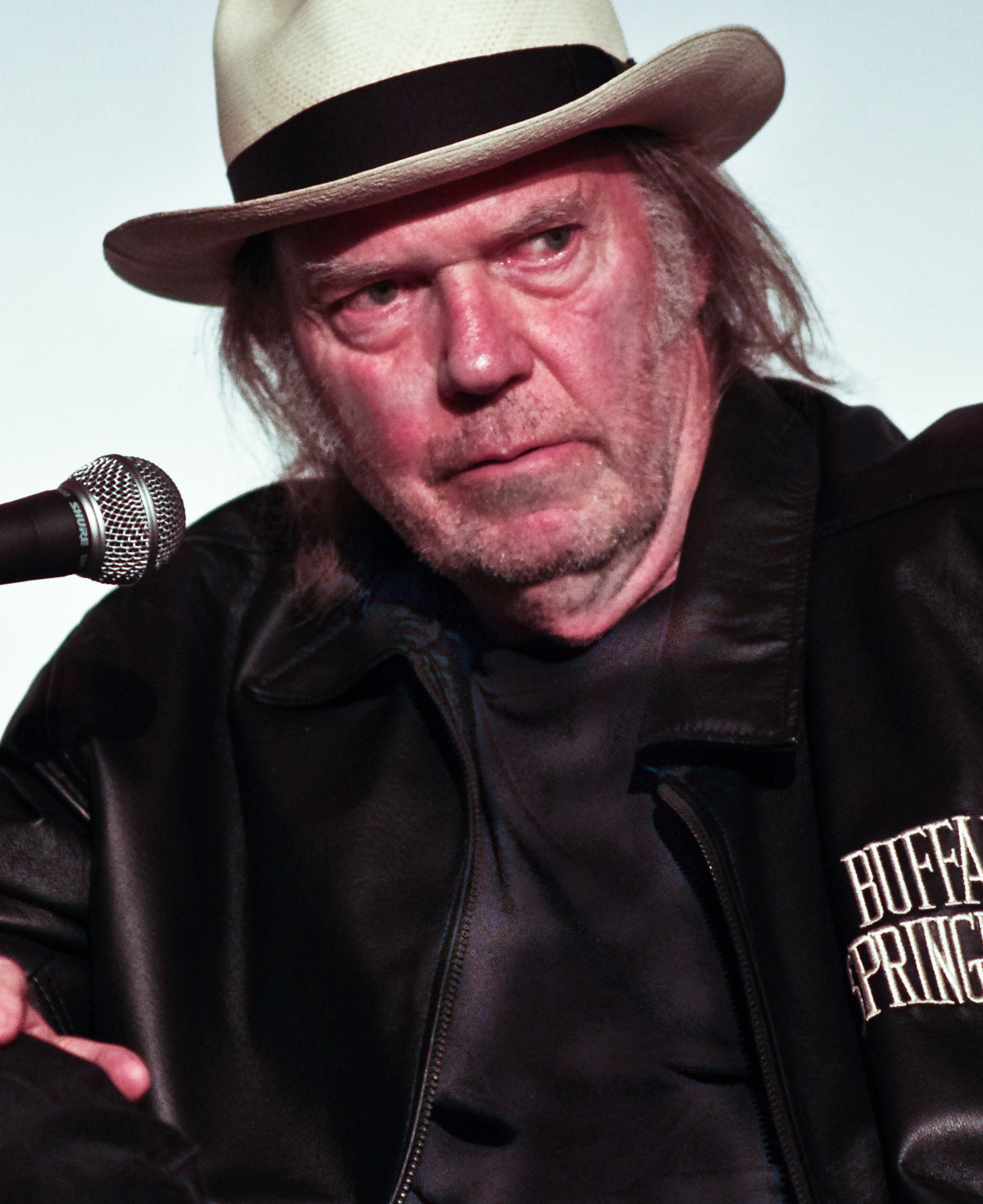
Neil Young

=== Actors ===
- Dave Bautista, retired professional wrestler, former mixed martial artist and bodybuilder, actor
- H. Jon Benjamin, voice actor and comedian
- James Cromwell, actor and activist
- David Cross, comedian, actor
- John Cusack, actor and activist
- Rosario Dawson, actress (previously endorsed Cory Booker)
- Danny DeVito, actor
- Kirsten Dunst, actress
- Alana Evans, pornography actress, president of the Adult Performers Actors Guild
- Ray Fisher, actor
- Jane Fonda, actress and activist
- Sandy Fox, voice actress
- Danny Glover, actor and film director
- Josh Hutcherson, actor and producer
- Skai Jackson, actress and author
- Milla Jovovich, actress, model, and musician
- Zoë Kravitz, actress, model and musician
- Ted Levine, actor
- Justin Long, actor and comedian
- Thomas Middleditch, actor, comedian, and screenwriter
- Ezra Miller, actor
- Hari Nef, actress, model, and writer
- Cynthia Nixon, actress, activist, and Democratic candidate for New York governor in 2018
- Rhea Perlman, actress and author
- Emily Ratajkowski, actress and model
- Tim Robbins, actor, screenwriter, director
- Mark Ruffalo, actor, producer, and activist
- Kendrick Sampson, actor
- Susan Sarandon, actress and activist
- Chloë Sevigny, actress, director, model
- Morgan Spector, actor
- Cole Sprouse, actor
- Tessa Thompson, actress and singer
- Brian Unger, actor, comedian, writer, producer, and commentator
- Dick Van Dyke, actor, comedian, writer, singer and dancer
- Shailene Woodley, actress

=== Athletes and sports figures ===
- Michael Bennett, NFL Dallas Cowboys defensive lineman
- Danny Davis, professional snowboarder
- Justin Jackson, NFL Los Angeles Chargers running back
- Kevin Lee, MMA fighter
- Leilani Munter, stock car racing driver
- David Starr, professional wrestler
- Spencer Strider, pitcher

=== Comedians ===
- Demi Adejuyigbe, comedian, writer, and social media personality
- James Adomian, comedian, actor, and noted Bernie Sanders impressionist
- Ted Alexandro, comedian
- Eric Andre, comedian and actor
- Trae Crowder, comedian
- Rob Delaney, actor and comedian
- Zack Fox, stand-up comedian, rapper, writer, illustrator and internet personality
- Ilana Glazer, comedian, writer, and actress, co-creator of Broad City
- Tim Heidecker, comedian, actor, and musician
- Helen Hong, comedian, actress and producer
- John Mulaney, comedian, actor, and screenwriter
- Rick Overton, comedian, actor and screenwriter
- Aida Rodriguez, comedian, actress, producer and writer
- Joe Rogan, comedian, podcast host (stated he would probably vote for Sanders)
- Jeff Ross, comedian
- Sarah Sherman, comedian, actress and writer
- Sarah Silverman, comedian, actress, producer, and writer
- Milana Vayntrub, comedian, actress, activist, director, and writer
- Jaboukie Young-White, comedian
- Amer Zahr, comedian, activist, professor at University of Detroit Mercy School of Law

=== Media and internet personalities ===
- Hailey Bieber, model and TV personality
- Caroline Calloway, writer and social media personality
- Anthony Fantano, music critic and video producer
- Hannah Hart, internet personality, comedian, author, and actress
- TJ Kirk, internet personality and podcast host
- Ethan Klein, comedian and internet personality (previously endorsed Andrew Yang)
- Lady Bunny, drag queen, nightclub DJ, musician, promoter
- Dasha Nekrasova, model and podcast host
- Tyler Oakley, internet personality, actor, author and LGBTQ activist
- SonicFox, professional esports player
- Natalie Wynn, YouTube video essayist

=== Musicians ===
- Adult Mom, lo-fi musician
- AJJ, folk-punk band
- Taína Asili, musician, singer-songwriter, poet, artist, and activist
- Awakebutstillinbed, emo rock project
- Ben Ballinger, folk singer-songwriter
- Devendra Banhart, Venezuelan American singer-songwriter and visual artist
- Julianna Barwick, electronic musician
- Harry Belafonte, singer, songwriter, actor and activist
- Max Bemis, lead singer, composer, and lyricist for Say Anything, and comic book writer
- Best Coast, rock duo
- Jello Biafra, punk rock singer of the Dead Kennedys, Green Party candidate in the 2000 United States presidential election, 1979 candidate for mayor of San Francisco, California (co-endorsement with Elizabeth Warren)
- Cedric Bixler-Zavala, singer and songwriter for The Mars Volta, singer and guitarist of At the Drive-In, drummer and singer for Foss which included bassist and 2020 presidential candidate Beto O'Rourke
- The Black Angels, psychedelic rock band
- Ben Blackwell, The Dirtbombs drummer, music writer and archivist
- Mykki Blanco, rapper, performance artist, poet and activist
- Weyes Blood, singer-songwriter, and musician
- Mal Blum, songwriter, musician, writer and performer
- Bon Iver, indie folk band, and founding member Justin Vernon
- Billy Bragg, English singer-songwriter and left-wing activist
- The Bright Light Social Hour, psychedelic rock band
- Brother Ali, rapper, community activist, and member of Rhymesayers Entertainment
- Bun B, rapper
- Molly Burch, singer-songwriter
- Las Cafeteras, spoken word and folk music Chicano band
- Cardi B, rapper
- Brandi Carlile, singer-songwriter
- Belinda Carlisle, singer-songwriter
- Julian Casablancas, singer, musician, songwriter, record producer, founder of Cult Records, lead singer and songwriter of The Strokes
- DJ Cassidy, DJ, record producer and MC
- Raffi Cavoukian, singer-songwriter
- Brad Corrigan, musician for Dispatch
- Frankie Cosmos, musician and singer-songwriter
- David Crosby, singer, guitarist, and songwriter
- André Cymone, bassist, songwriter, and producer
- Miley Cyrus, singer-songwriter and actress
- Lucy Dacus, indie rock singer-songwriter
- Dan Deacon, composer and electronic musician
- Deafheaven, post-metal band
- Deerhoof, independent music group
- Kevin Devine, songwriter and musician
- Diet Cig, indie rock duo
- Ani DiFranco, singer-songwriter
- Dikembe, rock band
- Dispatch, indie/roots band
- Ed Droste, singer-songwriter and member of Grizzly Bear
- Meg Duffy, musician and guitarist
- Sadie Dupuis, poet, multi-instrumentalist, and guitarist, lead vocalist, and lyricist for Speedy Ortiz
- Alex Ebert, singer-songwriter, composer, lead singer for Ima Robot and Edward Sharpe and the Magnetic Zeros
- Emperor X, singer and songwriter
- Fastball, rock band
- Sky Ferreira, singer, songwriter, model, and actress
- Béla Fleck, banjo player
- Robb Flynn, guitarist for Machine Head
- Nikolai Fraiture, musician and bassist for The Strokes
- Freeway, rapper, member of rap group State Property
- (Sandy) Alex G, musician
- The Ghost of Paul Revere, folk trio
- Kim Gordon, singer-songwriter and bassist, guitarist, and vocalist in Sonic Youth
- Mike Gordon, bass guitarist and vocalist, founding member of Phish
- Ariana Grande, singer, songwriter, and actress
- Grapetooth, new wave-influenced duo
- Meredith Graves, musician, writer, music journalist, anchor at MTV News, and frontwoman for Perfect Pussy
- Great Grandpa, indie rock group
- Grimes, musician, singer, record producer and visual artist
- Sarah Lee Guthrie, folk singer-songwriter
- Halsey, singer-songwriter
- Hand Habits, indie-rock band
- Holly Herndon, composer, musician and sound artist
- Will Hoge, Americana country music singer, songwriter, and musician
- Julia Holter, singer-songwriter, record producer, composer and artist
- How To Dress Well, multimedia artist, singer-songwriter and producer
- Hurry, indie rock band
- Juliana Huxtable, artist, writer, performer, DJ and member of the House of Ladosha artistic collective
- Illuminati Hotties, indie pop band
- Jim James, singer, guitarist, producer, and primary songwriter of My Morning Jacket
- Jesse & Joy, Mexican pop duo
- Zola Jesus, singer, songwriter, record producer and cousin of 2020 Democratic presidential candidate Amy Klobuchar
- Jack Johnson, singer-songwriter, multi-instrumentalist, actor, record producer, documentary filmmaker and former professional surfer
- Norah Jones, singer, songwriter and pianist
- Brendan Kelly, bassist and vocalist of The Lawrence Arms
- Mamak Khadem, trance music singer
- Anik Khan, rapper
- Killer Mike, rapper and activist
- Kississippi, pop and indie folk group
- Kitty, rapper, singer-songwriter, producer, visual artist, and record label owner
- Kevin Krauter, bassist for Hoops
- Mary Lattimore, classically trained harpist
- Sarah Leonard, classical soprano
- Lykke Li, Swedish singer, songwriter, and model
- Lil Yachty, rapper and singer-songwriter
- Dua Lipa, singer-songwriter and model
- Lissie, singer-songwriter
- Lizzo, rapper, singer-songwriter, and actress
- Local Natives, indie rock band
- Kelsey Lu, singer-songwriter and cellist
- Stephen Malkmus, musician, primary songwriter, lead singer and guitarist of Pavement
- Jeff Mangum, singer, songwriter, and multi-instrumentalist, founding member of Neutral Milk Hotel
- Mannequin Pussy, punk rock band
- Gia Margaret, singer-songwriter
- MΛX, singer-songwriter and actor
- Nellie McKay, singer-songwriter and activist
- Megafauna, hard rock band
- Vic Mensa, rapper and activist
- M.I.A., rapper, singer, songwriter, record producer, visual artist and activist
- Miike Snow, indie pop band
- Amie Miriello, singer-songwriter and guitarist
- Thurston Moore, musician in Sonic Youth
- Mr Twin Sister, chill wave, indie/dream pop, and disco band
- Jason Mraz, singer-songwriter
- New Power Generation, Prince backing band
- Noname, rapper, poet and record producer
- Oh Sees, rock band
- Ozomatli, Latin funk rock band
- Anderson Paak, rapper, songwriter, record producer and instrumentalist
- Mike Park, ska musician in Skankin' Pickle, The Chinkees, and The Bruce Lee Band
- Perfume Genius, indie pop musician
- Pet Symmetry, emo band
- Nicholas Petricca, lead singer of Walk the Moon
- Pinegrove, rock band
- Portugal. The Man, rock band
- Mike Posner, singer, songwriter, rapper, poet and record producer
- Cat Power, singer-songwriter, actress and model
- Power Trip, thrash band
- Jessica Pratt, musician and singer-songwriter
- Public Enemy Radio, hip hop group
- Pussy riot, punk rock band
- Radiator Hospital, indie rock band
- Ratboys, indie rock band
- Nathaniel Rateliff, singer and songwriter
- Ariel Rechtshaid, record producer, audio engineer, mixing engineer, multi-instrumentalist, and songwriter
- Remember Sports, indie rock band
- Residente, Calle 13 founder and rapper
- Retirement Party, emo group
- Boots Riley, rapper, producer, screenwriter, film director, activist and lead vocalist of The Coup and Street Sweeper Social Club
- Jeff Rosenstock, punk rock/ska punk musician
- Rostam, songwriter, composer, producer, and multi-instrumentalist of electro-soul group Discovery
- Sacred Reich, thrash metal band
- Noelle Scaggs, musician and singer-songwriter
- Shamir, singer, songwriter, and actor
- Sheer Mag, rock band
- Chris Shiflett, lead guitarist for Foo Fighters
- Harper Simon, singer-songwriter, guitarist and producer
- Willow Smith, singer, songwriter, record producer and actress
- Soccer Mommy, singer-songwriter and musician
- Jay Som, DIY and bedroom-pop singer
- Somos, rock band
- Sparta, rock band
- State Champs, rock band
- Stick To Your Guns, hardcore punk band
- Michael Stipe, singer-songwriter and lead singer of R.E.M.
- Chadwick Stokes Urmston, musician for Dispatch and activist
- Strange Ranger, indie rock band
- Stray from the Path, metalcore band
- The Strokes, indie rock band
- Sunflower Bean, rock band
- Tommie Sunshine, record producer and remixer
- Ian Sweet, indie rock musician
- SWMRS, punk rock band
- Serj Tankian, singer, songwriter, multi-instrumentalist, record producer, poet and political activist and lead vocalist, keyboardist, and guitarist of System of a Down
- T.I., rapper
- Ana Tijoux, Chilean-French singer
- Jeremy Toback, musician, writer
- Tony! Toni! Toné!, soul/R&B group
- Twiddle, rock band
- Twin Peaks, rock band
- Vampire Weekend, indie rock band, and frontman Ezra Koenig
- Vandoliers, alternative country music group
- Vundabar, indie rock band
- Half Waif, synth-pop musician and member of Pinegrove
- Roger Waters, English singer, songwriter, musician, and activist, co-founder of Pink Floyd
- Evan Weiss, musician, solo performer in Into It. Over It., and member of Pet Symmetry
- Wet, indie pop band
- Jack White, singer-songwriter, multi-instrumentalist, and producer
- Wild Pink, indie rock band
- The Wonder Years, pop punk band
- Brian Wright, singer-songwriter
- Young the Giant, indie rock band
- Neil Young, singer-songwriter, multi-instrumentalist and activist
- Zedd, DJ, record producer and songwriter

== Labor organizations ==
=== National ===
- APWU – American Postal Workers Union, representing 200,000 (Note: APWU Local 44 representing Des Moines, Iowa endorsed Sanders 12 days prior)
- NNU – National Nurses United, representing 150,000
- NUHW – National Union of Healthcare Workers, representing 15,000 (co-endorsement with Elizabeth Warren)
- UE – United Electrical, Radio and Machine Workers of America, representing 35,900

=== State, regional, and local divisions ===
- AFGE – American Federation of Government Employees: Local 704 (EPA Workers in IL, IN, MI, MN, OH & WI), representing 1,000
- AFM – American Federation of Musicians: Local 47 (Los Angeles, CA), representing 7,000
- AFSCME – American Federation of State, County, and Municipal Employees: Local 148 (Los Angeles County Public Defender Union), Local 3299 (CA), representing 27,000
- AFT – American Federation of Teachers: Vermont (VT), representing 5,000, Washington (WA), representing 6,500, Washington Teachers' Union (DC), representing 5,000, MATC Teachers' Union (WI), Local 2334 (NY), representing 22,000
- BIDG – The Boston Independent Drivers Guild (MA)
- CCEA – Clark County Educational Association, representing 19,000 (NV)
- CWA – Communications Workers of America: Local 9119 (CA), representing 17,000
- IBEW – International Brotherhood of Electrical Workers: Local 1634 (IA)
- IBT – International Brotherhood of Teamsters: Pennsylvania Federation Brotherhood of Maintenance of Way Employes Division (PA)
- ILWU – International Longshore and Warehouse Union: Inlandboatmen's Union of the Pacific (WA, AK, CA, OR, WA, HI), representing 3,500
- SEIU – Service Employees International Union: Local 1984, representing 10,000 (NH)
- UAW – United Automobile Workers: Local 2322, representing 5,000 (VT, NH, MA)
- UFCW – United Food and Commercial Workers International Union: Local 230 (IA) and Local 21 (WA), representing 46,000
- UNITE HERE: Local 11 (AZ, CA), representing 30,000 (co-endorsement with Elizabeth Warren), Local 23 (TX), Local 2 (CA), Local 30 (CA), Local 49 (CA), Local 483 (CA) and Local 2850 (CA), collectively representing 28,000, Local 8 (WA, OR) Local 7 (MD)
- UTLA – United Teachers Los Angeles, representing 35,000 (CA)
- UURWAW – United Union of Roofers, Waterproofers and Allied Workers: Local 36 (CA)
- Vermont State Labor Council AFL–CIO – representing 10,000

== Political organizations ==
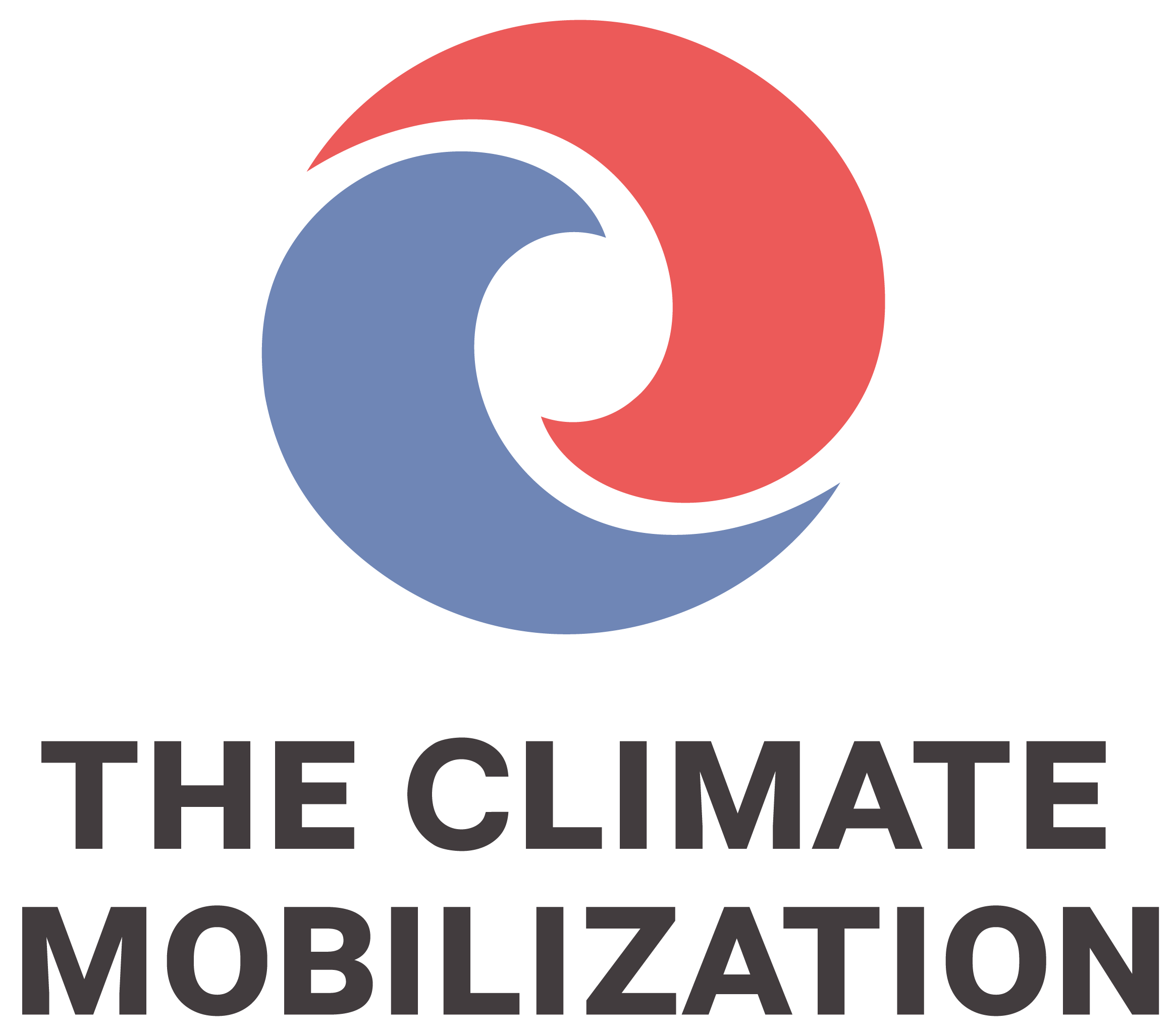
The Climate Mobilization

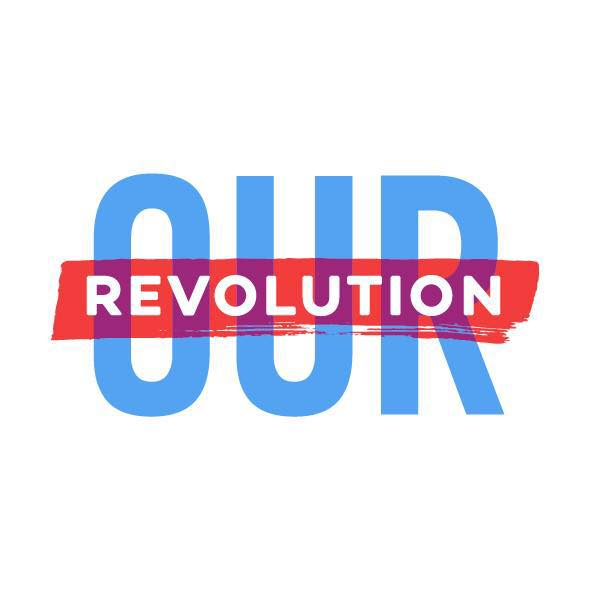
Our Revolution

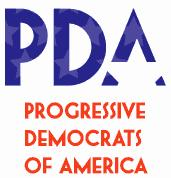
Progressive Democrats of America

=== National ===
- 350 Action (co-endorsement with Elizabeth Warren)
- Americans for Democratic Action
- Center for Popular Democracy
- The Climate Mobilization
- Democracy for America
- Democratic Socialists of America
  - Young Democratic Socialists of America
- Emgage
- Friends of the Earth (co-endorsement with Elizabeth Warren)
- IfNotNow
- Justice Democrats
- Make the Road Action
- Mijente
- Our Revolution
- The People for Bernie Sanders
- People's Action
- Progressive Democrats of America
- School Strike for Climate: US Youth Climate Strike
- Socialist Alternative
- Sunrise Movement
- Working Families Party (previously endorsed Elizabeth Warren)

=== State, regional, and local divisions ===
- 350 Action: 350 Santa Barbara (CA), 350 Philly (PA)
- Alliance of Californians for Community Empowerment
- Americans for Democratic Action (CA)
- CASA in Action (MD, PA, VA)
- Clark County Black Caucus (NV)
- College Democrats of America
  - Frostburg State University
  - Salisbury University
- Council on American–Islamic Relations: CAIR-CA Action (CA)
- Dream Defenders (FL)
- Iowa Citizens for Community Improvement
- Oregon Progressive Party
- Peace Action: Massachusetts Peace Action
- Stonewall Democrats
  - Harvey Milk LGBT Democratic Club (CA)
  - Jim Owles Liberal Democratic Club (NY)
  - Stonewall Democratic Club of Southern Nevada (NV)
- TakeAction Minnesota* United Working Families (IL)
- Vermont Progressive Party
- Young Democrats of America
  - California Young Democrats
  - Young Democrats of Michigan
  - Young Democrats of Rhode Island

=== International ===
- Australian Progressives
- Democracy in Europe Movement 2025
- Left Together (Poland)
- Party of the European Left
- Podemos (Spain)
- Young Labour (UK)
- Young Scots for Independence (Scotland)

== Tribal organizations ==
- Minnesota Chippewa Tribe: White Earth Band of Ojibwe

== Newspapers, magazines, and other media ==
=== Newspapers and magazines ===
General newspapers and magazines

- The Arab American News, Dearborn, Michigan
- The Conway Daily Sun, North Conway, New Hampshire
- Creative Loafing Tampa Bay, Tampa Bay, Florida
- Daily Hampshire Gazette, Northampton, Massachusetts
- The Detroit Metro Times, Detroit, Michigan
- Maui Time Weekly, Wailuku, Hawaii
- The Nation, New York City
- San Francisco Bay Guardian, San Francisco, California
- The Stranger, Seattle, Washington
- The Times-Standard, Eureka, California
- The Valley Advocate, Pioneer Valley, Massachusetts
- Yemeni American News, Dearborn, Michigan

Student newspapers

- The Chicago Maroon, Chicago, Illinois
- The Columbia Chronicle, Chicago, Illinois
- The Daily Iowan, Iowa City, Iowa
- The Daily Pennsylvanian, Philadelphia, Pennsylvania
- The Michigan Daily, Ann Arbor, Michigan

=== Social media ===
- Bernie Sanders' Dank Meme Stash, Facebook group with roughly 390,000 members
- da share z0ne, "Weird Twitter" account with 135,000+ followers
- New Urbanist Memes for Transit-Oriented Teens, Facebook group with roughly 175,000 members

=== Other ===
- Chapo Trap House, podcast
- Devil's Due Publishing, independent comic book publisher
- Polyvinyl Record Co., independent record label
- Run For Cover Records, independent record label
- Topshelf Records, independent record label

== See also ==
- Endorsements in the 2020 Democratic Party presidential primaries
- News media endorsements in the 2020 United States presidential primaries
- List of Bernie Sanders 2016 presidential campaign endorsements
- List of Joe Biden 2020 presidential campaign endorsements
