= Shirley (name) =

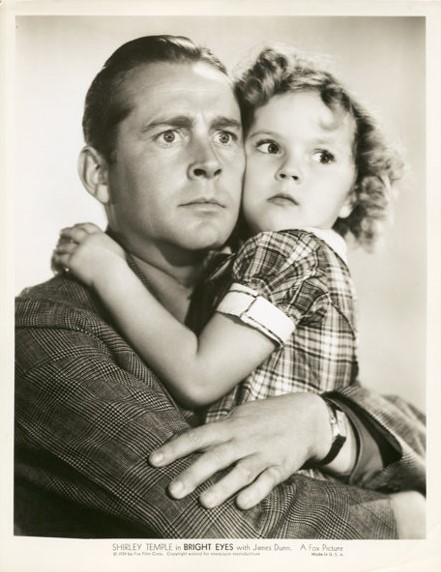
- Shirley Temple with James Dunn in the 1934 film Bright Eyes.
- Gender: Unisex
- Language: English

Origin
- Language: Old English
- Origin: Combination of scire or scīr and lēah
- Meaning: transferred use of an English surname or place name
- Region of origin: England

Other names
- Short form: Shirl
- Nicknames: Shelley, Shelly
- Related names: Shurley, Shipley

Shirley is a given name and a surname originating from the English place-name Shirley, which is derived from the Old English elements scire ("shire") or scīr ("bright, clear") and lēah ("wood, clearing, meadow, enclosure"). The name makes reference to the open space where the moot (an early English assembly of freemen which met to administer justice and discuss community issues) was held. The surname Shirley became established as a female given name in 1849 due to its use in Charlotte Brontë's novel Shirley, in which the character explains that her parents had intended the family surname for a son. It was further popularized in 1851–52 by its pseudonymous use by California Gold Rush writer Louise Amelia Knapp Smith Clappe (Dame Shirley). It was eventually brought to its highest popularity, in the 1930s, by the fame of child star Shirley Temple.

== Usage ==
Shirley was a well-used name throughout the Anglosphere during the 20th century. It was among the top 1,000 names used for newborn American girls between 1880 and 2008. It was among the top 100 names between 1918 and 1963 in the United States, and among the ten most popular names for American girls between 1927 and 1941. It reached peak popularity in 1935 and 1936, when it was the second most popular name given to newborn girls there. There were 133 newborn American girls who were given the name in 2022. The name was also among the top 1,000 names given to newborn American boys between 1880 and 1957, though the name was always given to more girls than boys. As a male name, Shirley reached the peak of popularity in 1935, when it was the 259th most popular name given to American boys. The name also ranked among the top 100 names for newborn girls in the United Kingdom between 1934 and 1964, among the top 1,000 names for girls in Canada between 1920 and 1965, among the top 100 names for girls in New Zealand between 1919 and 1964, and among the top 100 names in Australia during the same timeframe, until 1963. It was also among the top 1,000 names given to newborn girls in Brazil between 1930 and 2000, and ranked among the top 500 names for newborn girls in France in 1946 and again between 1974 and 2003.

== Given name ==
=== Female ===
==== Shirley ====
- Shirley (born 1946), Dutch singer
- Shirley Abicair (1928–2025), Australian singer, musician, actress and author
- Shirley Abrahamson (1933–2020), American judge
- Shirley Andrews (1915–2001), Australian biochemist
- Shirley Annan (1940–2017), New Zealand netball player
- Shirley Ardener, Cameroonian researcher
- Shirley Armstrong (1930–2018), Irish fencer
- Shirley Ascott (1930–1995), British sprint canoer
- Shirley Babashoff (born 1957), American swimmer
- Shirley Baker (1932–2014), British photographer
- Shirley Ballas (born 1960), English ballroom dancer
- Shirley Banfield (born 1937), Australian cricket player
- Shirley Barber (1935–2023), English author
- Shirley Barker (1911–1965), American author
- Shirley Barlow, English classicist
- Shirley Barrett (born 1961), Australian film director
- Shirley Barrie (1945–2018), Canadian playwright
- Shirley Bassey (born 1937), Welsh singer
- Shirley Bear (1936–2022), Tobique First Nation artist
- Shirley Becke (1917–2011), British police officer
- Shirley Berruz (born 1991), Ecuadorian footballer
- Shirley Blumberg (born 1952), Canadian architect
- Shirley Bond (born 1956), Canadian politician
- Shirley Bonne (born 1934), American actress and model
- Shirley Booth (1898–1992), American actress
- Shirley Booz (1927–2009), American model and dancer
- Shirley Borhauer (1926–2013), American politician
- Shirley Ayorkor Botchway (born 1963), Ghanaian politician
- Shirley Bottolfsen (1934–2021), Irish woman
- Shirley Bousquet (born 1976), French actress
- Shirley D. Bowler (born 1949), American writer, editor and politician
- Shirley Braha (born 1982), American television producer
- Shirley Brasher (born 1934), English tennis player
- Shirley Breeden, American politician
- Shirley Brifman (1935–1972), Australian prostitute and brothel madam
- Shirley Briggs (1918–2004), American artist, photographer, writer, and naturalist
- Shirley Brill (born 1982), Israeli clarinetist
- Shirley Brown (born 1947), American R&B singer
- Shirley Brown (Australian author) (born 1934), Australian author
- Shirley Brown (Florida politician), American politician
- Shirley Burgess (born c. 1934), British sprinter
- Shirley Burkovich (1933–2022), American baseball player
- Shirley Burman (born 1934), American photographer
- Shirley Caesar (born 1938), American gospel singer
- Shirley Cain (born 1935), British actress
- Shirley Aley Campbell (1925–2018), American painter
- Shirley Carr (1929–2010), Canadian political leader
- Shirley Cawley (born 1932), British athlete
- Shirley Cheechoo (born 1952), Canadian Cree actress, writer, producer, director, and visual artist
- Shirley Chisholm (1924–2005), American politician, educator and author, first African-American woman elected to Congress
- Shirley Clamp (born 1973), Swedish singer
- Shirley Bell Cole (1920–2010), American actress
- Shirley Collins (born 1935), English folk singer
- Shirley Collins (politician) (born 1952), Canadian politician
- Shirley Curry (born 1936), American YouTuber and gamer.
- Shirley Doty (1930 –2001) American politician
- Shirley Douglas (1934–2020), Canadian actress and activist
- Shirley Duguay (1962–1994), Canadian murder victim
- Shirley Dynevor (1933–2023), Welsh actress
- Shirley Eaton (born 1937), English actress, model and author
- Shirley Elliott (1916–2004), Canadian librarian
- Shirley Englehorn (1940–2022), American golfer
- Shirley Adele Field (1923–1995), American politician and judge
- Shirley Anne Field (1936–2023), English actress
- Shirley Bunnie Foy (1936–2016), American singer
- Shirley M. Frye, American mathematics educator
- Shirley Fulton (1954–2023), American judge
- Shirley Goodman (1936–2005), American R&B singer, half of the 1950s duo Shirley and Lee
- Shirley Ann Grau (1929–2020), American writer
- Shirley Gunn (born 1955), South African former anti-apartheid activist
- Shirley Brice Heath, American linguistic anthropologist
- Shirley Hemphill (1947–1999), American stand-up comedian and actress
- Shirley Henderson (born 1965), Scottish actress
- Shirley A. Hokanson (born 1936), American politician and social worker
- Shirley Huffman (1928–2018), American politician
- Shirley Ann Jackson (born 1946), American physicist
- Shirley Jackson (1916–1965), American writer
- Shirley Jefferson (born 1953), American law school administrator and professor
- Shirley Johnson (1937–2021), American politician
- Shirley Brannock Jones (1925–2019), American judge
- Shirley Jones (born 1934), American singer and actress
- Shirley Jülich (born 1949), New Zealand social work academic
- Shirley Kallek (1926–1983), American statistician
- Shirley Knight (1936–2020), American actress
- Shirley Kocaçınar (born 1986), Turkish-Dutch footballer
- Shirley Kwan (born 1966), Hong Kong Cantopop singer
- Shirley A. R. Lewis (born 1937), American educator, academic administrator, college president
- Shirley Love (mezzo-soprano) (born 1940), American opera singer
- Shirley McKague (1935–2020), American politician
- Shirley MacLaine (born 1934), American actress
- Shirley Mallmann (born 1977), Brazilian model
- Shirley Manson (born 1966), Scottish singer, lead vocalist of the rock band Garbage
- Shirley Ardell Mason (1923–1998), American teacher
- Shirley Muldowney (born 1940), American drag racer, first woman to receive a licence to drive a top fuel dragster by the NHRA
- Shirley Murray (1931–2020), New Zealand hymn writer
- Shirley Palmer (actress) (1908–2000), American film actress
- Shirley Palmer (Kansas politician) (1943–2023), American politician
- Shirley Phelps-Roper (born 1957), American lawyer and political activist
- Shirley Pitts (1934–1992), English fraudster and thief, the "Queen of shoplifters"
- Shirley Price, American politician from Delaware
- Shirley B. Randleman (born 1950), American politician
- Shirley Rumierk, American actress
- Shirley Ann Russell (1935–2002), British costume designer
- Shirley H. Scheibla (1919–2000), American journalist
- Shirley Scheier (born 1953), American artist
- Shirley Scott (1934–2002), American hard bop and soul-jazz organist
- Shirley Setia (fl. 2013–present), New Zealand singer
- Shirley Shen, Chinese–Canadian certified architect
- Shirley Sherrod, United States government employee who was unjustly fired in 2010
- Shirley Adelson Siegel (1918–2020), American lawyer
- Shirley-Anne Somerville (born 1974), British politician
- Shirley Soosay (1945–1980), Canadian murder victim
- Shirley Spork (1927–2022), American golfer
- Shirley Stelfox (1941–2015), English actress
- Shirley Temple (1928–2014), American actress, singer, dancer, businesswoman and diplomat
- Shirley Jane Turner (1961–2003), Canadian-American murderer
- Shirley Carew Titus (1892–1967), American nurse educator
- Shirley Ulmer (1914–2000), American screenwriter
- Shirley Walker (1945–2006), American film and television composer
- Shirley A. Walters (born 1948), Republican-American business person
- Shirley Williams (1930–2021), Baroness Williams of Crosby, English politician and academic
- Shirley Yeung (born 1978), Hong Kong actress
- Shirley Yu, Hong Kong actress
- Shirley Zhou (born 1978), Chinese table tennis player
- Shirley Zussman (1914–2021), American sex therapist

==== Shirli ====
- Shirli-Ann Siddall (born 1974), British professional tennis player

==== Shirlie ====
- Shirlie Holliman (born 1962), English singer

==== Shirlee ====
- Shirlee Busbee (born 1941), American writer
- Shirlee Emmons (1923–2010), American opera singer
- Shirlee Taylor Haizlip (born 1937), American author
- Shirlee Matheson (born 1943), American writer
- Shirlee Smith, American advocate, columnist and author
- Shirlee Zane (born 1959), American politician

=== Male ===
- Shirley Abbott (ambassador) (1923–2013), American businessman, diplomat, and politician
- Shirley Abbott (footballer) (1889–1947), English footballer
- Shirley Clifford Atchley (1871–1936), British diplomat and botanist
- Shirley Baker (architect) (1895–1942), American architect
- Shirley Waldemar Baker (1836–1903), English missionary and Prime Minister of Tonga
- Shirley Brooks (1816–1874), English journalist
- Shirley Brick (1898–1929), American football player
- Shirley Burden (1908–1989), American photographer
- Shirley Burden Jr. (1941–1996), American politician
- Shirley Jackson Case (1872–1947), American historian and liberal theologian
- Shirley Corea (1906–1974), Sri Lankan politician
- Shirley Clarke (cricketer) (born 1977), Barbarian cricketer
- Shirley Clay (died 1951), American jazz trumpeter
- Shirley Crabtree (1930–1997), English professional wrestler
- Shirley Davidson (1874–1907), Canadian ice hockey player
- Shirley Gill (born 1918), Barbarian cricketer
- Shirley Gillilland (1856–1927), American politician
- Shirley Griffith (1907–1974), American male blues singer and guitarist
- Shirley Griffiths (1930–2015), Barbarian cricketer
- Shirley Guthrie (1927–2004), American Presbyterian minister and author
- Shirley Hibberd (1825–1890), English writer
- Shirley Hubbard (1885–1962), English professional footballer
- Shirley Jeffries (1886–1963), Australian rules footballer and politician
- Shirley "Shirl" Jennings (1940–2003), one of the few people to regain his sight after nearly lifelong blindness
- Shirley S. Kastor (1895–1936), American politician
- Shirley Love (politician) (1933–2020), American politician and broadcaster journalist
- Shirley Majors (1913–1981), American football and baseball coach
- Shirley Hall Nichols (1884–1964), American bishop
- Shirley Palmer (physician) (1786–1852), English physician and medical writer
- Shirley W. Palmer-Ball (1930–2012), American politician
- Shirley Perera, Sri Lankan announcer
- Shirley Petway (1908–1984), American baseball player and catcher
- Shirley Povich (1905–1998), American sports columnist and reporter
- Shirley Leon Quimby (1893–1986), American physicist
- Shirley Reynolds (1873–1946), English rugby union player
- Shirley Simons (1897–1963), American architect
- Shirley Strachan (1952–2001), American singer, songwriter, radio and television presenter, and carpenter
- Shirley Waijayantha (born 1956), Sri Lankan musician and music illustrator
- Shirley Wilson (1925–2021), American football coach
- Shirley W. Wynne (1882–1942), Former New York City Health Commissioner

== Surname ==
Shirley
Origin
- Origin: Anglo-Saxon
- Meaning: habitational name for one who lived in one of the parishes called Shirley in the counties of Derbyshire, Surrey, Hampshire and the West Midlands.
- Region of origin: England

Shirley is a surname, with pockets of Shirleys living in New Hampshire, Massachusetts, Idaho, Kentucky, Mississippi, Utah, North Carolina, Tennessee, Virginia, Canada, New Zealand, Alaska, and parts of Great Britain. A work on the genealogy of the various branches of the Shirley family was published as Stemmata Shirleiana by E. P. Shirley in 1841. Their name comes from having lived in the parish of Shirley found in the counties of Derbyshire, Surrey, Hampshire and the West Midlands.

- Shirley (surname)

== Fictional characters ==
- Anne Shirley, the title character in Anne of Green Gables, a 1908 novel by Lucy Maude Montgomery, as well as numerous adaptations
  - Shirley Blythe, Anne's son, in Anne of Ingleside, Rainbow Valley, and Rilla of Ingleside, the sequels to Anne of Green Gables, all by Lucy Maude Montgomery, as well as adaptations
- Shirley Anne Bingham, a UNIT adviser in the British science fiction series Doctor Who
- Miss Shirley Brahms, a fictional character in the British sitcom Are You Being Served?
- Shirley Carter, a fictional character in the British soap opera EastEnders
- Shirley Duck, the mother of Flick Duck in "PB&J Otter"
- Shirley the Loon, in Tiny Toon Adventures
- Shirley Fenette, a character in the anime Code Geass
- Shirley, a.k.a. Charlotte E. Yeager, a character from the mixed-media franchise Strike Witches
- Shirley, a fictional character in The Jimmy Timmy Power Hour 3
- Shirley, a hairdresser in the videogame MySims
- Shirley Fennes, a character in the videogame Tales of Legendia
- Shirley Feeney, titular character in Laverne & Shirley
- Shirley Ghostman, Marc Wootton's character in High Spirits with Shirley Ghostman
- Shirley Keeldar, titular character in the Charlotte Brontë novel Shirley
- Shirley Partridge, the main character in The Partridge Family
- Shirley Sheridan, a character in the 1934 American romantic musical movie The Cat and the Fiddle
- Shirley, one of the main characters of Shaun the Sheep
- Shirley, an elderly female bird in The Angry Birds Movie
- The title character of the Shirley Valentine and its film adaptation

== See also ==
- John Shirley-Quirk, British opera singer
- Shirl, often a diminutive form of Shirley
- Shelley, a nickname for Shirley
- Shurley, a variant of the surname Shirley
