= Zephyr Teachout =

American academic, political activist and candidate

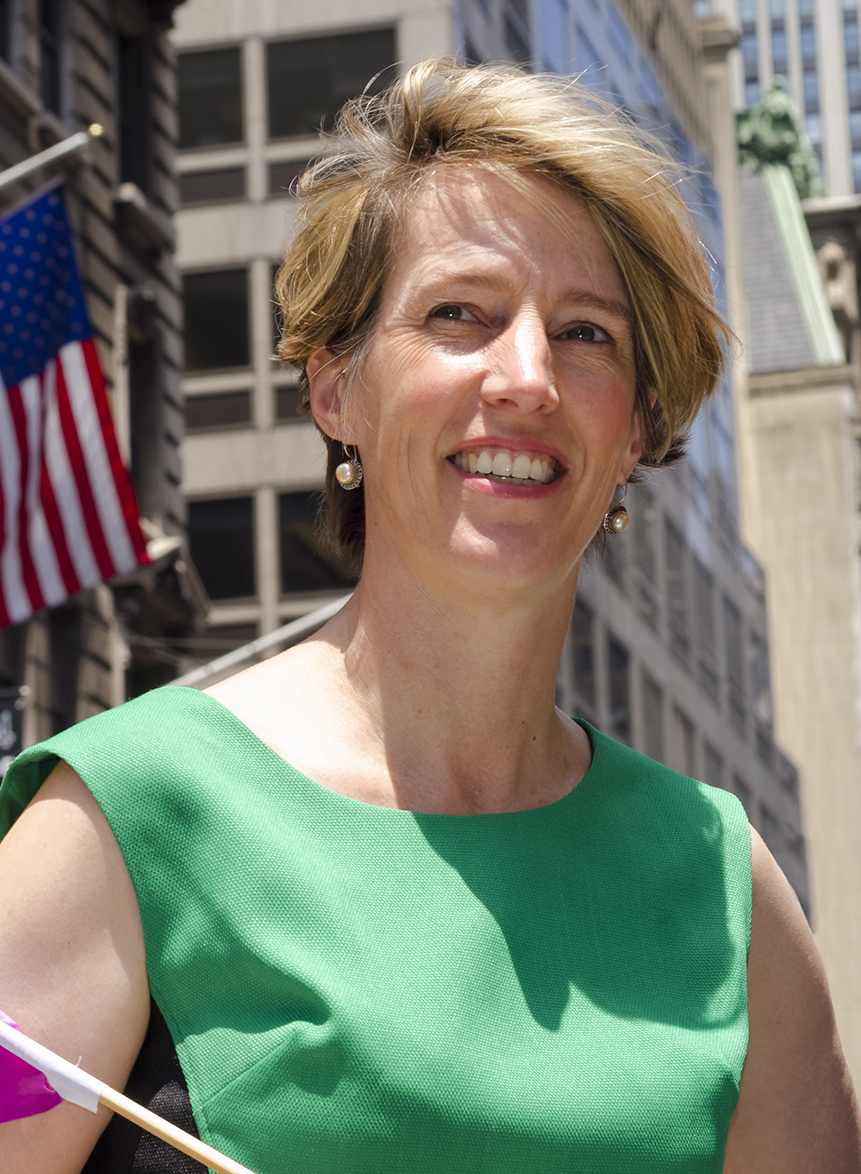
- Teachout in 2014
- Born: Zephyr Rain Teachout; October 24, 1971 (age 55); Seattle, Washington, U.S.
- Education: Yale University (BA); Duke University (MA, JD)
- Occupations: Attorney; Professor of Law, Fordham Law School
- Years active: 1999–present
- Political party: Democratic
- Spouse: Nicholas Juliusburger
- Children: 1

Zephyr Rain Teachout (/ˈtiːtʃaʊt/, born October 24, 1971) is an American attorney, author, political candidate, and professor specializing in law of democracy and antitrust law at Fordham University.

In 2014, Teachout ran for the Democratic Party nomination for governor of New York and lost to incumbent governor Andrew Cuomo, receiving 33% of the primary vote. In 2016, Teachout was a candidate for the United States House of Representatives in New York's 19th congressional district. Teachout won the Democratic primary before losing to Republican John Faso. In 2018, Teachout was a candidate for New York State attorney general in the 2018 elections but lost the Democratic nomination to Letitia James. Her candidacy was endorsed by The New York Times.

On November 15, 2021, Teachout again announced her candidacy for the Democratic nomination for New York State attorney general, but suspended her campaign after the incumbent, James, who had been running for governor, instead ran for reelection. Teachout endorsed James when she announced the suspension of her campaign.

On January 24, 2022, the New York State attorney general's office appointed Teachout as a special advisor and senior counsel for economic justice.

== Early life and education ==
Teachout was born in Seattle, Washington, the second of five children to Peter Teachout and Mary Miles Teachout. Peter, who served in the United States Army as a lieutenant during the Vietnam War and graduated from Harvard Law School, was a professor at the University of Washington at the time. The family relocated to Vermont, where Peter became a constitutional law professor at Vermont Law School, and Mary has served as a trial judge and founded the Vermont Law Review.

Raised on a farm outside Norwich, Vermont, Teachout attended Hanover High School in Hanover, New Hampshire, where she was a champion cross-country runner and acted in school plays.

In 1993, Teachout received a B.A. degree from Yale University. In 1999, she earned two simultaneous degrees from Duke University: a Juris Doctor, summa cum laude, and a Master of Arts degree in political science. She was also editor-in-chief of the Duke Law Journal.

== Career ==
After graduating from law school, Teachout clerked for Chief Judge Edward R. Becker of the United States Court of Appeals for the Third Circuit. She served as the director of Internet organizing for the 2004 Howard Dean presidential campaign. In 2009 she helped found the Antitrust League. She was the first national director of the Sunlight Foundation, which promotes transparency and accountability in government.

She has been a professor at Fordham Law School since 2009. She was a visiting professor of law at Duke University in 2007 and a lecturer at the University of Vermont.

=== Actor ===
Teachout is also an actor who has performed in many plays at the Unadilla Theatre in Marshfield, Vermont, directed by Bill Blachly, appearing as Katherine in Shakespeare's Love's Labour's Lost in 1994 and as Imogen in Shakespeare's Cymbeline in 1995. She played Winnie in Samuel Beckett's Happy Days in 2012 and 2019. In 2013, Teachout was Lady Utterwood in George Bernard Shaw's Heartbreak House. In 2019, she played Anne in Florian Zeller's 2012 play The Father.

=== Public affairs ===
In August 2015, Teachout became CEO and board chair of the campaign finance reform–oriented organization Mayday PAC, replacing Lawrence Lessig. She stepped down from this position in December 2015 to run for the U.S. House of Representatives in New York's 19th congressional district.

Teachout volunteered at Occupy Wall Street, where she encouraged the movement to focus on the importance of decentralized power, citing the ideas of James Madison, and worked to educate activists in corporate law and policy.

In January 2017, Teachout joined the Citizens for Responsibility and Ethics in Washington's lawsuit against President Trump, alleging violations of the Constitution's emoluments clause.

As of May 2018, she served on the board of advisors of Let America Vote, an organization founded by former Missouri Secretary of State Jason Kander that aims to end voter suppression. In October of that year she was appointed to the editorial board of The Nation.

=== 2014 New York gubernatorial campaign ===
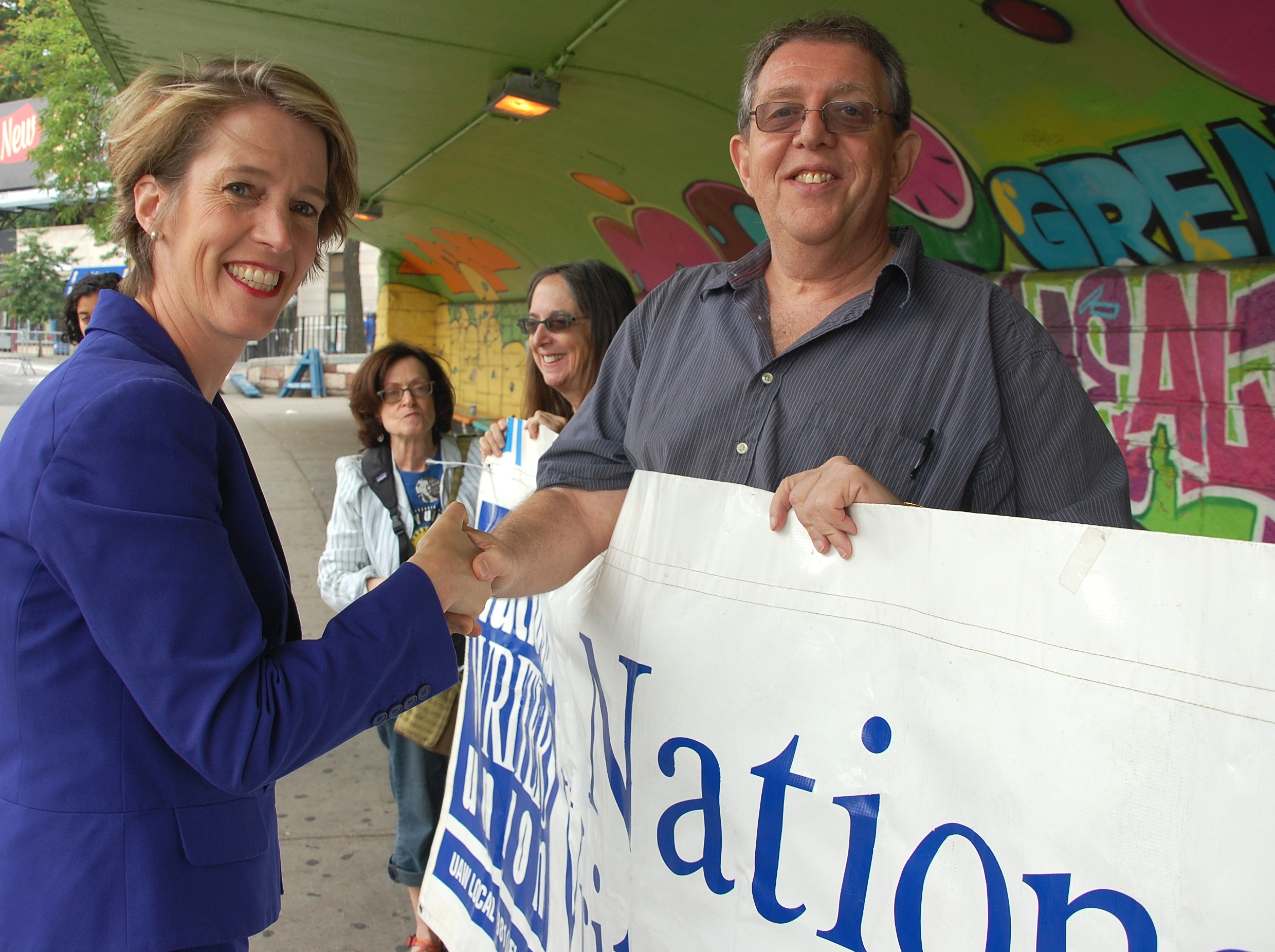
Teachout shaking hands with National Writers Union (UAW Local 1981) president Larry Goldbetter at the "We Will Not Go Back" march and rally held on August 23, 2014.

Teachout faced off against incumbent Andrew Cuomo and comedian Randy Credico in the Democratic primary election on September 9, 2014. In July 2014, the Board of Elections received objections from Harris Weiss and Austin Sternlicht challenging Teachout's New York residency. She first ran for the Working Families Party nomination, but lost to Cuomo. His margin of victory was much smaller than expected, especially since the Working Families Party traditionally cross-endorses the Democratic Party candidate.

Teachout then announced that she would run for the Democratic nomination. Her running mate was Tim Wu, a Columbia University Law School professor who coined the phrase "net neutrality". Their platform called for a rollback of Cuomo's tax cuts for the wealthy, investment in transportation and broadband infrastructure, a statewide fracking ban, an end to high-stakes testing and fair funding for schools in both under-resourced and affluent school districts, restoring voting rights to convicted felons, and support for the NY DREAM Act and anti-corruption measures, including public financing of elections to reduce the power of corporate donors and affluent political insiders.

Their campaign raised $800,000, a small amount for New York state politics. Four days before the primary, polls showed their likely voter share at 26%, in line with the predictions of political professionals.

Teachout and Wu lost to Cuomo and his running mate, former U.S. Representative Kathy Hochul, in the primary on September 9, 2014. Although Teachout was only expected to receive 26% of the vote (based on polling days before the election), she received 33%.

=== 2016 U.S. House campaign ===
In March 2015, Teachout moved from Brooklyn to Dutchess County, New York. Ten months later she announced her candidacy in New York's 19th congressional district's 2016 Democratic congressional primary. She ran to replace Republican Chris Gibson, who was retiring. In the June 28 primary Teachout won the nomination. She was endorsed by U.S. Senators Bernie Sanders, Kirsten Gillibrand, and Chuck Schumer, New York Governor Andrew Cuomo, the National Education Association, New York State United Teachers, National Nurses United, the Communication Workers of America, EMILY's List, and the Sierra Club. She lost to Republican John Faso in the November 8 general election by nine percentage points.

=== 2018 Attorney General campaign ===
Teachout served as treasurer for Cynthia Nixon's campaign for governor of New York until May 2018, when she announced she was running for attorney general of New York in the 2018 election. At the time Teachout was pregnant, expecting a child in October, one month after the primary and one month before the general election. On August 19, 2018, The New York Times endorsed Teachout for state attorney general. Its editorial board members argued that she would be the ideal candidate to hold both President Trump as well as the state government to account.

On September 13, 2018, Teachout lost the Democratic primary for attorney general to Letitia James, receiving 31% of the vote to James's 40.6%.

=== 2022 Attorney General campaign ===
On October 29, 2021, New York Attorney General Letitia James announced her candidacy for governor in 2022. Teachout had previously announced that if James ran for governor, she would run again for attorney general in the Democratic primary. On November 15, Teachout announced her candidacy on her Twitter account and at a press conference in Downtown Brooklyn. Her campaign was supported by Minnesota Attorney General Keith Ellison and Harvard Law School Professor Lawrence Lessig. James ended her campaign for governor, and decided to run for reelection for New York Attorney General; on December 12 Teachout suspended her campaign for attorney general and endorsed James.

=== Senior counsel for economic justice ===
On January 24, 2022, the New York State attorney general's office appointed Teachout as a special advisor and senior counsel for economic justice. In a tweet, she wrote that she would take a leave of absence from her position at Fordham Law School.

== Political views ==
Teachout was among the minority of Democratic congressional candidates who endorsed Bernie Sanders during the 2016 Democratic presidential primaries. She was also among the first candidates Sanders endorsed. He subsequently endorsed her for attorney general of New York in 2018, and Teachout endorsed him in the 2020 Democratic presidential primary. In a January 2020 opinion column in The Guardian, Teachout wrote that Sanders's Democratic presidential rival Joe Biden had "a big corruption problem" arising from his relationships with donors over the course of his Senate career. Sanders apologized to Biden for the article, saying: "It is absolutely not my view that Joe is corrupt in any way."

Teachout's platform for her House campaign included a higher minimum wage, increased spending on public infrastructure, a ban on fracking, an increase in manufacturing jobs, property tax cuts, increased investment in rural infrastructure, an end to Common Core and high-stakes testing, and campaign finance reform (specifically working to overturn Citizens United v. FEC).

While running for Attorney General of New York, Teachout pledged that she would use the power of the office to sue Trump for violating anti-corruption laws and to force him to divest from his businesses.

== Electoral history ==
2014 New York gubernatorial Democratic primary
Party	Candidate	Votes	%
Democratic	Andrew Cuomo (incumbent)	361,380	62.92%
Democratic	Zephyr Teachout	192,210	33.47%
Democratic	Randy Credico	20,760	3.61%
Total votes		574,350	100.00%

2016 New York's 19th Congressional District Democratic primary
Party	Candidate	Votes	%
Democratic	Zephyr Teachout	13,801	71.3%
Democratic	Will Yandik	5,561	28.7%
Total votes		19,362	100.00%

2016 New York's 19th Congressional District general election
Party	Candidate	Votes	%
Republican	John Faso	134,825	44.4%
Conservative	John Faso	21,156	7.0%
Independence	John Faso	7,943	2.6%
Reform	John Faso	876	0.3%
Total	John Faso	164,800	54.3%
Democratic	Zephyr Teachout	123,733	40.7%
Working Families	Zephyr Teachout	15,067	5.0%
Total	Zephyr Teachout	138,800	45.7%
Total votes		303,600	100.00%
Republican hold			

2018 New York Attorney General Democratic primary
Party	Candidate	Votes	%
Democratic	Letitia James	608,308	38.53%
Democratic	Zephyr Teachout	468,083	29.65%
Democratic	Sean Patrick Maloney	379,099	24.02%
Democratic	Leecia Eve	52,367	3.32%
Total votes		1,578,588	100.00%

== Personal life and family ==
Teachout is married to Nicholas S. Juliusburger, a software company executive. They live in East Harlem, Manhattan.

In October 2018, Teachout and Juliusburger were expecting their first child. Teachout used footage of her receiving an ultrasound in a campaign advertisement.

In 2020, Teachout enrolled in the Master of Divinity program at Union Theological Seminary. For her field education, she served at Saint Luke's Lutheran Church.

== Selected works and publications ==
=== Books ===
- Teachout, Zephyr; Streeter, Thomas, eds. (2007). Mousepads, Shoe Leather, and Hope: Lessons from the Howard Dean Campaign for the Future of Internet Politics. Boulder, CO: Paradigm Publishers. ISBN 9781594514845. OCLC 1100703254.
- Teachout, Zephyr (2014). Corruption in America: From Benjamin Franklin's Snuff Box to Citizens United. Cambridge, MA: Harvard University Press. ISBN 9780674050402. OCLC 900727926.
- Teachout, Zephyr (2020). Break 'Em Up: Recovering Our Freedom from Big Ag, Big Tech, and Big Money. New York: All Points Book/St. Martin's Publishing Group. ISBN 9781250200891. OCLC 1112261337.

=== Selected articles ===
- Teachout, Zephyr Rain (April 1999). "Defining and Punishing Abroad: Constitutional Limits on the Extraterritorial Reach of the Offenses Clause". Duke Law Journal. 48 (6). Duke University School of Law: 1305–1331. doi:10.2307/1373018. ISSN 0012-7086. JSTOR 1373018. OCLC 5544330962.
- Teachout, Zephyr (Autumn 2001). "Received Forms". Feminist Studies. 27 (3). Feminist Studies, Inc.: 732. doi:10.2307/3178816. ISSN 0046-3663. JSTOR 3178816. OCLC 5547967358.
- Teachout, Zephyr (Winter 2004–2005). "CB's, Meetup, and Visible Volunteers: From the Dean Campaign to the Future of Internet Organizing". Social Policy. 35 (2). American Institute for Social Justice: 4. ISSN 0037-7783. OCLC 98468683.
- Teachout, Zephyr (Winter 2005–2006). "Organizing Connection: Lessons from the 'Net". Social Policy. 36 (2). American Institute for Social Justice: 24. ISSN 0037-7783. OCLC 102260391.
- Teachout, Zephyr (2009). "The Anti-Corruption Principle" (PDF). Cornell Law Review. 94 (2): 341–413. ISSN 0010-8847. OCLC 779230052. Archived from the original (PDF) on May 29, 2009.
- Teachout, Zephyr (2009). "Extraterritorial Electioneering and the Globalization of American Elections". Berkeley Journal of International Law. 27 (1): 162–191. ISSN 1085-5718. OCLC 8091528754. Archived from the original on August 18, 2017.
- Teachout, Zephyr (January 2011). "Facts in Exile: Corruption and Abstraction in Citizens United v. Federal Election Commission". Loyola University Chicago Law Journal. 42 (2). doi:10.2139/ssrn.1946004. OCLC 7375038005. SSRN 1946004.
- Teachout, Zephyr (2011). "The Unenforceable Corrupt Contract: Corruption and 19th Century Contract Law". NYU Review of Law and Social Change. 35: 681–705. ISSN 0048-7481.
- Teachout, Zephyr (2011). "The Historical Roots of Citizens United v. FEC: How Anarchists and Academics Accidentally Created Corporate Speech Rights" (PDF). Harvard Law & Policy Review. 5 (1): 163–187. Archived from the original (PDF) on May 6, 2020.
- Teachout, Zephyr; Khan, Lina (2014). "Market Structure and Political Law: A Taxonomy of Power". Duke Journal of Constitutional Law & Public Policy. 9 (2): 37–74. ISSN 1937-9439. OCLC 904591607.
- Teachout, Zephyr; Tillman, Seth Barrett (2016). "The Foreign Emoluments Clause: Article I, Section 9, Clause 8" (Interactive online website). Interactive Constitution. National Constitution Center.
