= Schroyer =

Schroyer is a surname. Notable people with the surname include:

- Heath Schroyer (born 1972), Senior Deputy Athletic Director at Louisiana State University
- Lance Schroyer, American government official
- Trent Schroyer (1936–2018), American scholar, author and international activist

== See also ==
- Schreyer, surname
- Schroyer Formation, geological formation in Kansas
- Shrayer, surname
- Shroyer, surname
