= Schreier =

Schreier is a surname of German origin. Notable people with the surname include:

- Christian Schreier (born 1959), German footballer
- Dan Moses Schreier, American sound designer and composer
- Jake Schreier (born 1981), American director
- Józef Schreier (1909–1943), Polish mathematician
- Karen Schreier (born 1956), American district judge
- Otto Schreier (1901–1929), Austrian mathematician
- Peter Schreier (1935–2019), German tenor and conductor
- Richard Schreier, Canadian engineer
- Sandy Schreier, American fashion historian and collector
- Jason Schreier (born 1987), American journalist and author

== See also ==
- Schreyer
- Shrayer
- Shroyer, Pennsylvania German form
- Shrier, Americanized version
