= Schreyer =

Schreyer is a surname of German origin. Notable people with the surname include:

- A. M. Schreyer (died 1919), American daredevil cyclist and athlete
- Adolf Schreyer (1828–1899), German painter
- Cindy Schreyer (born 1963), American golfer
- Dirk Schreyer (1944–2025), German rower
- Edward Schreyer (born 1935), Canadian politician
- Frank-Olaf Schreyer, German mathematician
- Fred Schreyer, American bowling official
- Helmut Schreyer (1912–1984), German inventor
- Kerstin Schreyer (born 1971), German politician
- Lily Schreyer (born c. 1938), Canadian Viceregal Consort
- Lothar Schreyer (1886–1966), German artist
- Lynn Schreyer American mathematician
- Michaele Schreyer (born 1951), German European Commissioner
- Peter Schreyer (born 1953), German auto designer
- Wolfgang Schreyer (1927–2017), German writer

== See also ==
- Schreier
- Shrayer
- Shroyer
