= Beverly Wright =

American environmental justice scholar

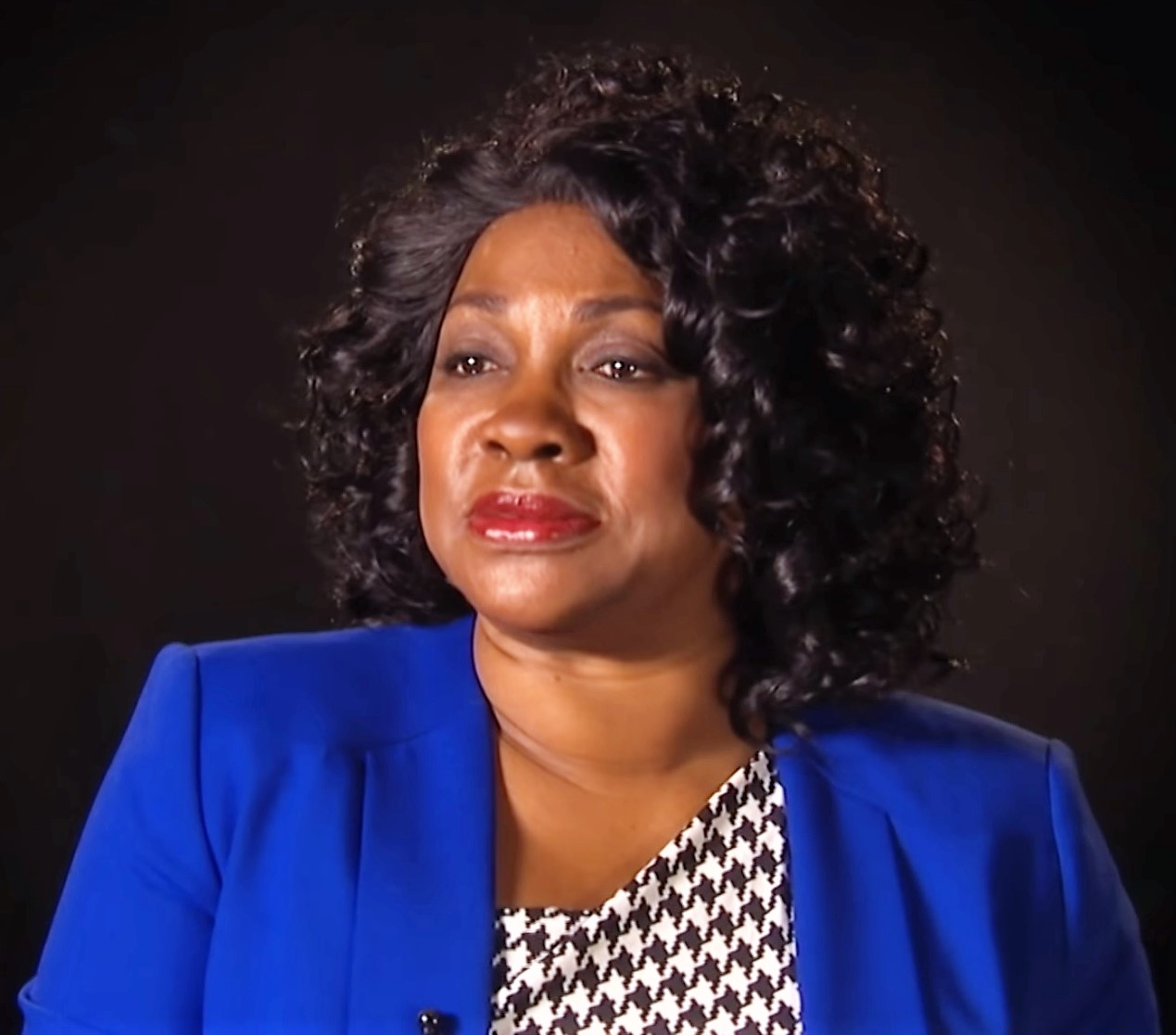
- Wright for the United States Environmental Protection Agency 20th Anniversary Environmental Justice Video Series in 2013

Academic background
- Education: Grambling State University; State University of New York at Buffalo

Beverly Wright is an American environmental justice scholar and the founder of the Deep South Center for Environmental Justice at Dillard University. Her research considers the environmental and health inequalities along the Mississippi River Chemical Corridor. Her awards and honors include the Environmental Protection Agency Environmental Justice Achievement Award and a 15th Heinz Award with Special Focus on the Environment.

== Early life and education ==
Wright was born in Louisiana, close to a highly polluted area that was known as ‘Cancer Alley’. She has said that these childhood experiences were essential in shaping her research career. Wright studied sociology at Grambling State University. She moved to State University of New York at Buffalo as a graduate student. During her early research, Wright realised the racial disparities of cancer alley, noticing that the majority of people who lived along the polluted corridor were communities of colour. In an interview with Vice magazine Wright remarked, “All the birds had disappeared except for the crows. Screens on their windows were rusting and falling off in like three months. The air was so corrosive that the paint on their cars was being melted off,”. In 1991 she attended the People of Color Environmental Leadership Summit in Washington, D.C., where she met Damu Smith. Smith was the founder of the National Black Environmental Justice Network (NBEJN).

== Career ==
In 1992 Wright became the founder and executive director of the Deep South Center for Environmental Justice (DSCEJ) at Dillard University. The DSCEJ is a community–university partnership that investigates the impacts of environmental and health inequality along the Lower Mississippi River Industrial Center, which is so polluted that it became known as Cancer Alley. Her research combined population and demographic data with Toxics Release Inventory reports to better understand the correlations between race and pollution. She has shown that almost 80% of African-Americans live in polluted neighbourhoods. Wright and the DSCEJ developed an environmental justice curriculum for elementary schools in New Orleans. She worked on the National Institute of Environmental Health Sciences Minority Worker Training and Brownfields Minority Training Program, which helped people from underserved communities find careers in environmental and health sciences. Working with Robert D. Bullard, Wright popularised the Latinx term “the wrong complexion for protection”.

In the aftermath of Hurricane Katrina, Wright focussed on outreach and training programmes for the African-American community in New Orleans. She has worked to support displaced residents in returning to their homes, working with policy makers to address issues surrounding environmental restoration. Hurricane Katrina's flooding resulted in lead saturation in New Orleans soil. Wright showed that lead exposure was particularly bad in areas where there were significant numbers of Black families. She worked with American steelworkers to design a programme known as A Safe Way Back Home, which looks to clean abandoned homes and neighbourhoods of pollutants. The DSCEJ were involved with the response to the Deepwater Horizon oil spill.

Wright has worked with Mitch Landrieu on his Sustainable Energy and Environmental Taskforce. In 2017 she delivered expert testimony to the Council of the City of New Orleans to describe the risks associated with a Entergy gas power plant. In 2019 Entergy were fined $5 million for bringing in paid actors to influence to council's decision making process.

Under the 2020 Biden Administration, Wright was appointed in 2021 to the new White House Environmental Justice Advisory Council (WHEJAC). In the 2022 United Nations Climate Change Conference (COP27), she contributed to creating the first Climate Justice Pavilion to highlight underrepresented voices that face climate change issues at a disproportionate rate. In 2022, Wright testified before Congressional subcommittees on how additional gas and oil fields along the Gulf Coast are harmful to Black and Indigenous Peoples.

== Academic service ==
As Wright became more involved with environmental issues she started to realise how underrepresented Black people were at international climate events. In response, she organised a climate change conference for students at historically black colleges and universities, hosted at Dillard University and including a tour of East Plaquemines Parish. Wright is a member of the National Black Environmental Justice Network, which reformed in June 2020. With the newly reformed NBEJN Wright has been serving as an advisor for Joe Biden's climate emergency plan alongside Tamara Toles of 350.org.

== Awards and honors ==
- 2006 Robert Wood Johnson Community Health Leadership Award
- 2008 United States Environmental Protection Agency Environmental Justice Achievement Award
- 2008 Rainbow PUSH Coalition Community Award
- 2009 Heinz Award
- 2010 TheGrio 100 History Makers
- 2010 National Institute of Science Beta Kappa Chi Humanitarian Assistance Award
- 2010 Society for the Anthropology of Work Conrad Arensberg Award
- 2011 Urban Affairs Association's SAGE Activist Scholar Award

== Selected publications ==
=== Books ===
- Bullard, Robert D.; Wright, Beverly (2018-04-17), "Race, Place, and the Environment in Post-Katrina New Orleans", Race, Place, and Environmental Justice after Hurricane Katrina, Routledge, pp. 17–48, doi:10.4324/9780429497858-1, ISBN 978-0-429-49785-8
- Bullard, Robert D. (Robert Doyle), 1946- (2012). The wrong complexion for protection : how the government response to disaster endangers African American communities. Wright, Beverly (Sociologist). New York: New York University Press. ISBN 978-0-8147-7193-8. OCLC 801411067.

==== Book contributions ====
- Wright, Beverly. “Black New Orleans Before and After Hurricane Katrina,” in Bullard, Robert D. (2007). The Black Metropolis in the Twenty-First Century: Race, Power, and the Politics of Place. New York: Rowman & Littlefield. pp. 173–198. ISBN 9780742543294.
- Wright, Beverly. “Washed Away by Hurricane Katrina: Rebuilding a ‘New’ New Orleans,” in Bullard, Robert D. (2007). Growing Smarter: Achieving Livable Communities, Environmental Justice and Regional Equity. Cambridge: The MIT Press. pp. 189–214. ISBN 9780262026109.
- Wright, Beverly. “Living and Dying in Louisiana’s Cancer Alley,” Chapter 4 in Bullard, Robert D. (2005). The Quest For Environmental Justice: Human rights and the Politics of Pollution. San Francisco: Sierra Club Books. ISBN 9781578051205.
- Wright, Beverly. “Just Sustainabilities: Development in an Unequal World,” Pp. 125–145 in Agyeman, J., Bullard, R.D., and Evans, B., Race, Politics, and Pollution: Environmental Justice in the Mississippi River Chemical Corridor, Earthscan Publication, MIT Press, 2003. ISBN 9781849771771
- Bullard, Robert D. and Beverly Wright. “Environmental Justice for All,” Pp. 448–462, xiii, 609, in Understanding Prejudice and Discrimination. Plous, Scott (Ed.), New York, NY, US: McGraw-Hill, 2003. ISBN 9780072554434

=== Peer-reviewed articles ===
- Bullard, Robert D.; Mohai, Paul; Saha, Robin; Wright, Beverly (2008). "Toxic Wastes and Race at Twenty: Why Race Still Matters After All of These Years". Environmental Law. 38 (2): 371–411. ISSN 0046-2276. JSTOR 43267204.
- Bullard, Robert D.; Wright, Beverly H. (1993-09-01). "Environmental Justice for all: Community Perspectives on Health and Research". Toxicology and Industrial Health. 9 (5): 821–841. Bibcode:1993ToxIH...9..821B. doi:10.1177/074823379300900508. ISSN 0748-2337. PMID 8184445. S2CID 7384564.

=== Monographs ===
- Beverly Wright. Congressional Hearing Testimony, Subcommittee on Superfund and Environmental Health hearing entitled, “Oversight of the EPA’s Environmental Justice Programs." July 25, 2007.
- Beverly Wright. “Liability and Environmental Laws” Publication: Congressional Testimony Publish date: November 8, 2005.
- Bullard, Robert D. and Beverly Wright. “The Color of Toxic Debris,” Pp.A9-A11 in The American Prospect – Demos, After Katrina: Redemption & Rebuilding, A report prepared for the Initiative for Regional and Community Transformation at Rutgers University and The McKnight Foundation (March 2009)
- Bullard, R., P. Mohai, R. Saha, and Wright, B, “Toxic Wastes and Race at Twenty,” United Church of Christ, Cleveland, OH (March 2007).
- Pastor, M., Bullard, R., Boyce, J., Fothergill, A., Morello-Frosch, R., Wright, B. Pp 20 & 26 “In the Wake of the Storm: Environment, Disaster, and Race after Katrina,” Russell Sage Foundation, NY (May 2006).
- Wright, B., Sarpong, D., Babefemi, A., “The Socioeconomic Impact of Air Toxics on Disproportionately Exposed Communities,” Deep South Center for Environmental Justice, New Orleans, LA (2001).
