= Shrier =

Shrier is a surname, an Americanized form of the German surname Schreier. Notable people with the surname include:

- Alvin Shrier, Canadian physiologist
- David Shrier, American futurist, author and entrepreneur
