= Shurley =

Shurley is a surname. Notable people with the surname include:

- George Shurley (1569–1647), English judge, Lord Chief Justice of Ireland
- John Shurley (disambiguation), multiple people

== See also ==
- Hurley (surname)
- Shirley (name)
