= Dicus =

Dicus is one of several spellings of a surname that has also been used to represent several apparently unrelated surnames. Other most common spellings of the surname Dicus with the same pronunciation as Dicus are Dycus and Dicas.

Notable people with the name include:

- Chuck Dicus (born 1948), American football wide receiver
- Richard Earl Dicus (1910–1996), suffragan bishop of the Episcopal Diocese of West Texas
- Stephen Dycus (born 1941), American professor of law.
