= Dan Ormsbee =

American architect

Daniel Wilt Ormsbee (March 4, 1884 – April 3, 1985) was an American architect. With John Branner and Shirley Baker he submitted a design for the Stanford Stadium into the town planning category of the art competitions at the 1932 Summer Olympics, but did not win a medal. He was born in Nord, California and attended California State University, Chico. In 1923 he and Baker opened the private engineering firm Baker & Ormsbee and ran it for a decade. Ormsbee moved to Colorado in 1933 to take up a job with the Colorado State Highway Department (now the Colorado Department of Transportation). At the time of his retirement in 1955 he was District Engineer in charge of the Valley Highway portion of Interstate 25 in Colorado. He died at the age of 101 in April 1985.
