= Shirl =

Shirl is a given name, often a short form (hypocorism) of Shirley. It may refer to:

People:

- Shirl Bernheim, stage name of American actress Shirley Raphael (1921–2009)
- Shirl Conway, stage name of American actress Shirley Crossman (1916–2007)
- Shirl, a stage name of Graeme Strachan (1952–2001), Australian singer, songwriter, radio and television presenter and carpenter
- Shirl Henke (born 1942), American romance novelist
- Shirley Shirl Jennings (1940–2003), one of the few people to regain his sight after nearly lifelong blindness
- Colleen Shirley Perry Smith (1924–1988), better known as Mum Shirl, Aboriginal Australian humanitarian, activist and social worker

Fictional characters:

- Laverne's name for Shirley in the American television series Laverne & Shirley
- Shirl, wife of Cockney Wanker in the British magazine Viz
