= RoseAnn DeMoro =

Former executive director of National Nurses United

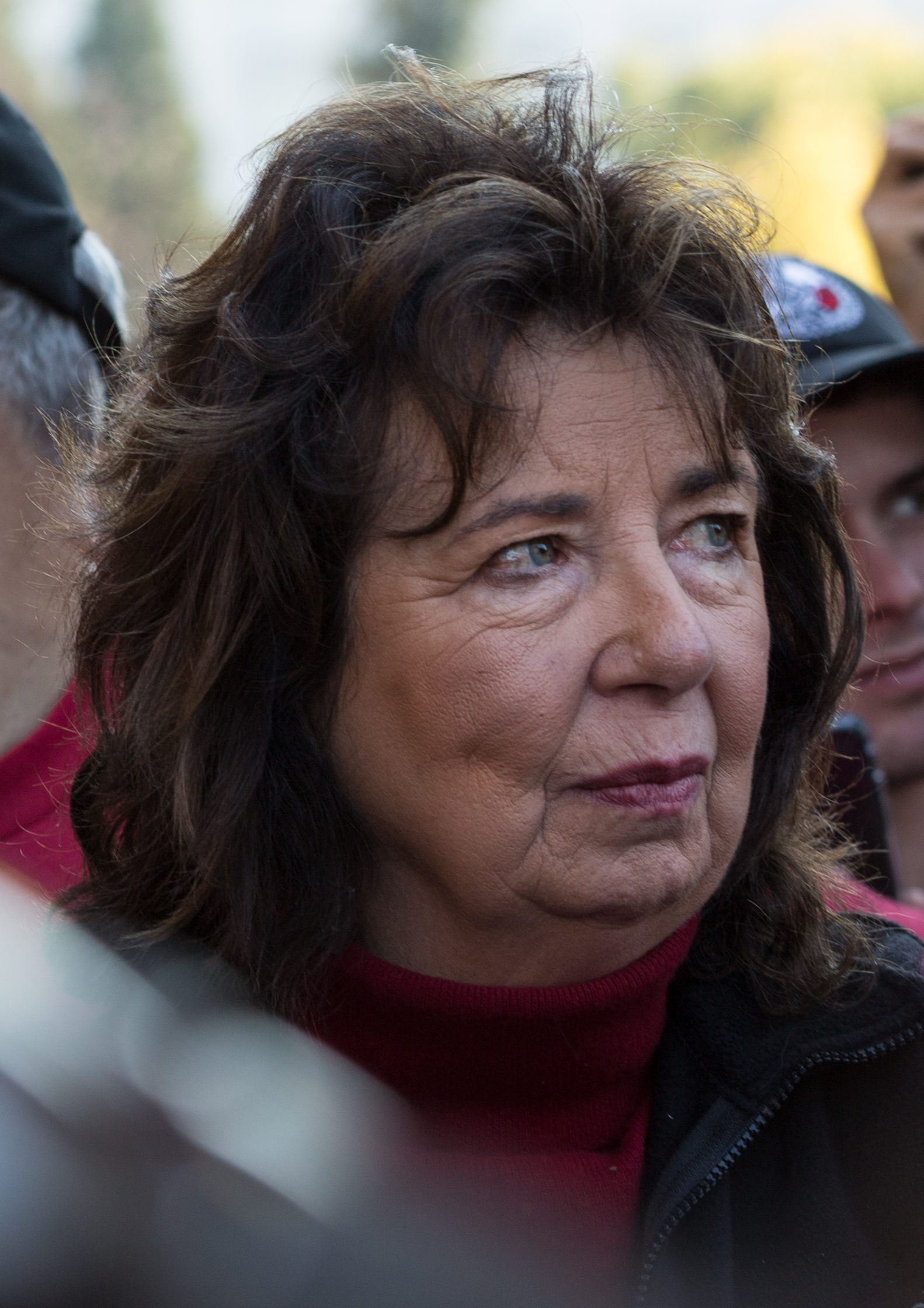
- Born: 1949 (age 76–77); St. Louis, Missouri, U.S.
- Education: Southern Illinois University, Edwardsville (BA); University of California, Santa; Barbara
- Political party: Democratic

RoseAnn DeMoro is the former executive director of National Nurses United and the California Nurses Association/National Nurses Organizing Committee and a former national vice president and executive board member of the AFL–CIO.

== Personal life and education ==
DeMoro was born in St. Louis, Missouri in 1949 and grew up in a working-class neighborhood. She earned a degree in women's studies from Southern Illinois University. She married in 1968 and after college, she and her husband moved to Santa Barbara, California, where she began to work on a PhD in sociology. During that time, she worked as an organizer for the American Federation of Teachers and the University of California clerical workers. She gave up her studies to work for the Teamsters as the first female organizer for the Western Conference of Teamsters. DeMoro later described the sexism she experienced at the Teamsters as "intolerable," and in 1986, she took a collective bargaining position at the California Nurses Association.

DeMoro married her high school boyfriend, Don DeMoro, in 1968. They have two children.

== Career ==
DeMoro is the former executive director of National Nurses United, the largest professional and labor organization of registered nurses in the United States. De Moro is also the former executive director of the California Nurses Association/National Nurses Organizing Committee. She retired in March 2018.

DeMoro has been profiled in The New York Times, Wall Street Journal, Los Angeles Times, San Francisco Chronicle, Business Week, and the Chicago Tribune. She has also appeared on some national and California news programs, including Bill Moyers Journal, CBS' 60 Minutes, PBS' Now, and the Lehrer News Hour.

== Honors and awards ==
DeMoro has been named "America's Best & Brightest" by Esquire magazine, dubbed "The Most Influential Woman You've Never Heard Of" by More magazine, honored among "America's Most Influential Women" by MSN, and one of only eight people to be cited among the "100 Most Powerful People in Healthcare" for 14 consecutive years by Modern Healthcare magazine.

Trade union offices
Preceded by Barbara Nichols	Executive Director of the California Nurses Association; 1992–2009	Succeeded by Union merged
Preceded by Union founded	Executive Director of National Nurses United; 2009–2018	Succeeded by Bonnie Castillo
