= Bonnie Castillo =

American nurse labor leader

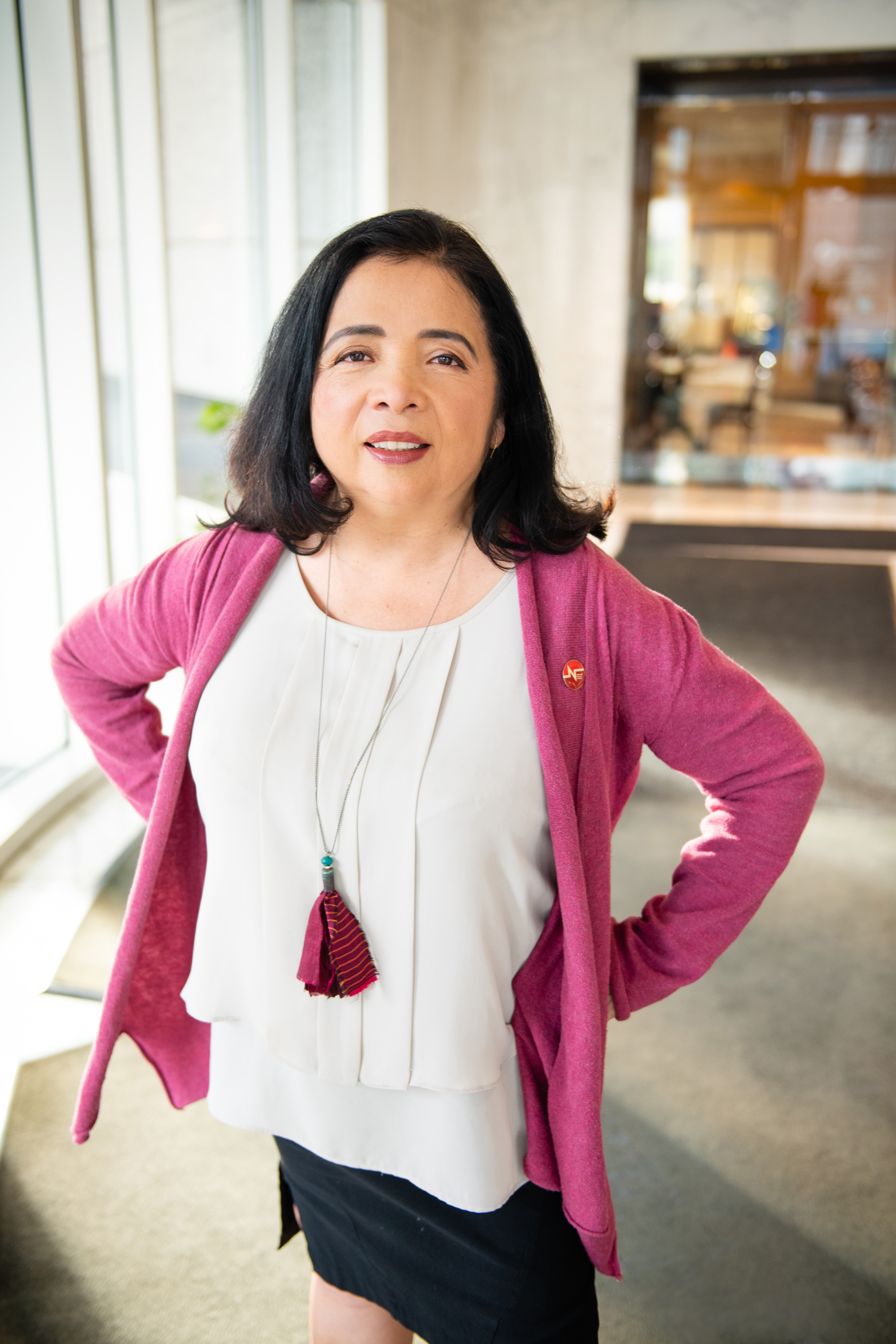
- Born: 1960 (age 65–66); Sacramento, California, USA
- Education: California State University, Sacramento (BS)

Bonnie Castillo was the executive director of National Nurses United, the largest American organization of RNs. She also led the California Nurses Association/National Nurses Organizing Committee. She was the first Latina to hold the title in the history of the organization. Castillo also held the positions of CNA/NNOC director of government relations and NNU director of health and safety. She has been with CNA/NNOC for almost two decades in a number of capacities, working her way up into the leadership of the organization from her early days as a registered nurse member who helped to unionize her facility, to staff and then lead organizer, to a director, and now to her current position as executive director. Castillo was named to the Time 100 list of the most influential people in the world for the year 2020. In January 2021, Castillo was named to The Nation's annual honor roll, which recognizes progressive activists and leaders who helped keep hope alive and set the groundwork for transformational change in 2021.

Trade union offices
Preceded by RoseAnn DeMoro	Executive Director of National Nurses United; 2018–present	Succeeded by Incumbent
