= Beth McCormack =

American academic administrator

Dean of the Vermont Law School
- Incumbent
- Assumed office 2021

Personal details
- Education: University of Chicago; Boston University

Beth McCormack is an American lawyer and academic administrator serving as dean of the Vermont Law and Graduate School since 2021. She also concurrently served as the first woman tho hold the role of interim president from January 2021 to June 2022. Beginning July 1, 2025, she and graduate-school dean Dan Bromberg jointly assumed the institution's presidential duties on an interim basis.

== Life ==
McCormack earned a bachelor's degree from the University of Chicago in 1996 and a Juris Doctor degree from Boston University School of Law in 2001.

She worked as a litigator at Mintz Levin where she handled commercial cases with a focus on construction disputes, as well as state and federal court matters and alternative dispute resolution. While in private practice she taught legal research and writing as an adjunct instructor at Boston University School of Law. She spent a six-month period as a special assistant district attorney in Middlesex County, Massachusetts. McCormack is licensed to practice in Massachusetts and before the U.S. District Court for the District of Massachusetts and the U.S. Court of Appeals for the First Circuit.

=== Vermont Law and Graduate School ===
McCormack joined the Vermont Law School faculty in 2011. She held successive administrative posts in student academic support and the legal-writing program, and later served as deputy vice dean for academic affairs. From 2017 onward she was vice dean for students. She advised the school's moot court board and coached its national moot court team. Her teaching has included civil procedure, legal writing, legal methods, and advanced appellate advocacy.

In January 2021 the board appointed McCormack interim president and dean, the first woman to occupy that combined role in the school's history. She succeeded Thomas McHenry, who had announced his departure the previous fall. She remained in the interim dual role for just over a year following McHenry's early exit.

When the institution became Vermont Law and Graduate School on July 1, 2022 and the president and dean positions were separated, she continued as interim dean of the law school for the 2022 to 2023 academic year. By April 2025 she was serving as law school dean. Effective July 1, 2025 she and graduate school dean Dan Bromberg will jointly assumed the president's duties on an interim basis after Rodney A. Smolla's departure.
