= Anthony Doria =

Academic institution founder

Anthony Doria (June 2, 1927 – May 23, 2013) was the founder and president of both Royalton College and Vermont Law and Graduate School in South Royalton, Vermont. He also was a perennial candidate for political office, running to represent Vermont in the United States House of Representatives in 1972 and the United States Senate in 1980 and 1986, ultimately winning only a small percentage of the votes in all three elections.

== Early life ==
Doria was born as Anthony Notarnicola D’Oria in Savona, Italy. He claimed to be descended from Italian nobility, to have fought against Mussolini as an Italian partisan and was called "the Count" by local residents in Vermont. Doria claimed to hold a Doctor of Jurisprudence degree from the University of Rome, but an investigation by Vermont Governor Phillip Hoff countered that the degree was "virtually meaningless." He moved to the United States in 1949 and graduated from the Wharton School. He started a travel business in Philadelphia, later moving to South Royalton, Vermont in 1966.

While living in South Royalton, he renovated many buildings in town and was owner of the Royalton Inn. He also founded more than a dozen corporations in the town.

== Royalton College ==
In 1965, he founded Royalton College and served as its president. By 1969, Doria had amassed 22 pieces of property for Royalton College, but only 30 students. Some in the Vermont State Senate wondered if Royalton College was "an educational institution or a real estate speculation firm."

By 1972, Royalton was a co-educational institution.

In 1974, Doria hosted a series of conference for the Institute for Humane Studies at Royalton College that explored Austrian economics.

== Vermont Law School ==
Also in 1965, Doria purchased the town's former high school, Debevoise Hall, which would later serve as the home of Vermont Law School. In 1973, Doria officially opened Vermont Law School, and served as dean, despite the fact that he was not a lawyer. Prominent judges such as Sterry Waterman (who ironically had not yet finished a law degree himself) argued against the opening of the school, claiming that “Vermont doesn’t need a law school.” Less than two years after founding Vermont Law School, it was revealed that Doria had been convicted of fraud related to his travel business in 1960 in Pennsylvania for obtaining a loan under false pretenses, and he resigned from Vermont Law School shortly thereafter, in July 1974. The conviction was later vacated in 1976 by the Supreme Court of Pennsylvania.

== Politics ==
In 1972, he ran in the special election to fill the Vermont at-large House district seat. During a lecture that year, Doria argued for improved U.S-China relations and argued that Chinese Communism was not as bad as portrayed by the United States media.

Doria ran for United States Senate in Vermont in 1980, losing in the Republican Primary and running in the general election as an Independent candidate. He ran again in 1986, again losing the Republican Primary, but this time running as a conservative in the general election. In both elections, Democratic incumbent Patrick Leahy was reelected.

== Later life ==
In 2003, Doria was indicted by a federal grand jury, accused out of defrauding a woman of $115,000. In 2005, he pled guilty in U.S. District Court to tax evasion in conjunction with the case and sentenced by Judge John Garvan Murtha to 30 days in jail and five months of home confinement.

== Personal life ==
Doria had two children.
