= California Nurses Association/National Nurses Organizing Committee =

American labor union

CNA/NNOC
- Founded: 1903
- Headquarters: Oakland, California, U.S.
- Location: United States
- Members: 100,000 (2018)
- Key people: Executive director, Bonnie Castillo; Presidents: Deborah Burger, Zenei Cortez, Cokie Giles, Malinda Markowitz
- Affiliations: National Nurses United (AFL–CIO)
- Website: www.calnurses.org

The California Nurses Association/National Nurses Organizing Committee (CNA/NNOC), an affiliate of National Nurses United, is a labor union and professional association of registered nurses in the United States. Since 2018, CNA/NNOC has been led by Executive Director Bonnie Castillo, RN.

== Policies and activities ==
=== COVID-19 pandemic ===
California has the only legislatively mandated nurse-to-patient ratios in the country. In December 2020, during the fall/winter COVID-19 pandemic surge, governor Gavin Newsom gave all hospitals a temporary waiver from those mandates, which allowed hospitals, for example, to have ICU nurses care for three patients rather than two. The union protested against these waivers, saying that the staffing shortages are the fault of the hospitals, who should have anticipated the surge of cases and increased staff ahead of time. The union also stated that they felt that this temporary measure would not be temporary, but that the pandemic would be used as a reason to permanently revoke the staffing ratio requirements. The expedited waivers ended February 2021, and the union claimed victory.

=== Public profile ===
A California Field Poll in April 2008 found that CNA has the highest favorable rating among all groups, politicians, and institutions involved in public policy debates over health care reform in the state.

On May 9, 2008, the Public Broadcasting Service television show with Bill Moyers featured a segment on CNA/NNOC describing a campaign conducted by the organization saying all Americans should be entitled to the same level of care available to Vice President Dick Cheney and members of Congress.

The growing achievements of CNA and NNU received much national attention in 2010. A profile of CNA and DeMoro in Business Week, July 22, 2010, noted, "Under DeMoro, the union threw itself into the broader fight for patients' rights in the face of consolidation in hospital chains and insurers. The NNU simply takes that fight national, says DeMoro." The Washington Post, November 20, 2010 described "an aggressive strategy by a national nurses union, experts say: Its members are growing in numbers, and they have not been afraid to walk picket lines." The San Francisco Chronicle, in an article headlined, "Nurses union becomes potent political force," November 24, 2010, wrote, "The Oakland-based California Nurses Association has made its mark by delivering some powerful political punches with a combination of entertaining theater and savvy strategizing."

== History ==
The California Nurses Association was formed in 1903 as the California State Nurses Association.

CNA was the first nurses union in the U.S. to win collective bargaining contracts for nurses when Shirley Carew Titus advocated for agreements with the East Bay Hospital Conference for minimum salaries, time-and-a-half pay for overtime, shift differentials for night and weekend work, a 40-hour work week, paid holidays, vacations, and sick leave, and employer-paid health insurance.

According to CNA/NNU, in 2004 CNA formed a national affiliate, the National Nurses Organizing Committee (NNOC), which was joined by nurses associations from multiple states over the next several years.

In April 2008, the CNA/NNOC clashed with SEIU over an agreement between SEIU and Catholic Healthcare Partners of Ohio. CNA/NNOC labeled the election a "sham." SEIU and Catholic Healthcare Partners cancelled the election for 8,000 workers in 9 Ohio hospitals on whether to have SEIU representation. NNOC contends that the agreement fits SEIU's pattern of forging controversial agreements with employers that sacrifice public protections and workplace standards in exchange for more members. The conflict continued until March, 2009, when CNA/NNOC and SEIU announced that the unions would cooperate to organize hospital employees, with nurses joining the nurses union and other hospital staff joining the SEIU.

=== National Nurses United established ===
On February 18, 2009, CNA/NNOC announced that it is joining with two other nurses unions, the Massachusetts Nurses Association and the United American Nurses, to create a 150,000-member union. The organization is called National Nurses United and is affiliated with the AFL–CIO. Deborah Burger, co-president of CNA/NNOC said that the new group is intended to give registered nurses a national voice and more organizing strength.

On January 3, 2013, the CNA joined forces with the National Union of Healthcare Workers (NUHW) to form a new union, NUHW-CNA. Part of the motivation regarding the affiliation was the 2013 election for 43.000 Kaiser service and tech workers represented at the time by CNA rival, SEIU UHW. Despite CNA support, SEIU UHW won the election and the partnership between CNA and NUHW eventually ended.

== Executive Directors ==
1942: Shirley Carew Titus
1956: Marian Alford
1966: A. Lionne Conta
1970s: Barbara Nichols
1992: RoseAnn DeMoro
2018: Bonnie Castillo
2025: Puneet Maharaj

== See also ==
- List of nursing organizations
- National health insurance
- Single-payer health care
- Universal health care
