= Thomas K. Clancy =

American lawyer

- Born: Thomas Kevin Clancy; 1952 (age 73–74)
- Education: University of Notre Dame (BA); Vermont Law School (JD)
- Occupations: Lawyer, Legal Educator

Thomas Kevin Clancy (born 1952) is an American legal educator and lawyer. He is a professor emeritus at the University of Mississippi School of Law and lectures nationally on cyber crime and the Fourth Amendment, which regulates governmental searches and seizures. He previously served as the director of the National Center for Justice and the Rule of Law at the University of Mississippi School of Law, where he was a research professor. He took emeritus status on July 1, 2014. Clancy received his B.A. from the University of Notre Dame, and is a graduate of Vermont Law School.

Before teaching at the University of Mississippi School of Law he was a member of the adjunct faculties at the University of Baltimore School of Law from 1998 to 2001 and the University of Maryland Francis King Carey School of Law from 1993 to 2001. Clancy was a distinguished visiting professor at West Virginia University School of Law in 2012-03. He was a visiting professor at the William S. Richardson School of Law in the summers of 2003 and 2007. In the spring of 1995 he was a visiting professor at Vermont Law School. From 1983 to 1985 he was a member of the adjunct faculty at the American University, Washington College of Law. From 1980 to 1981 he was a legal writing instructor at Vermont Law School.

From 1981 to 1982 he practiced law with the Legal Services Corporation. From 1982 to 1988 he was in private practice in Washington, DC. From 1988 to 1999 he was an Assistant Attorney General for the Criminal Appeals Division in the Office of the Attorney General of Maryland. From 1999 to 2001 he was chief of the Post Conviction Unit within the State’s Attorney’s Office for Prince George's County, Maryland.

Clancy's legal publications focus on the history, structure, and purpose of the Fourth Amendment, including the acquisition by the government of digital evidence. Works by Clancy include Cyber Crime and Digital Evidence: Materials and Cases, with the fifth edition to be published in January 2027, casebound, ISBN 978-1-5310-3508-2. He has also published a treatise on search and seizure entitled The Fourth Amendment: Its History and Interpretation, with a fourth edition forthcoming in February 2027, casebound, ISBN 978-1-5310-3510-5. Each book is published by Carolina Academic Press. His many law review articles on the Fourth Amendment are available at: http://ssrn.com/author=509497

Clancy is also the author of an American history book, Life, Liberty, and the Pursuit of Happiness: Fourth of July Stories, published by Sunbury Press, ISBN 9798888192542. The book tells stories occurring on one day--the Fourth of July--throughout our 250 year history. Inside the book's covers are the Founders who gave birth to the idea that all people are created equal and the men and women of later generations who have sought to make that ideal a reality.
