= John Shirley (disambiguation) =

John Shirley (born 1953) is an American writer.

John or Jon Shirley may also refer to:

- John Shirley (footballer) (1902–?), footballer
- John Shirley (sailor) (born 1958), British Virgin Islands sailor
- John Shirley (scribe) (died 1456)
- John Shirley (died 1616), English politician
- Jon Shirley (born 1938), president of Microsoft

== See also ==
- John Shurley (disambiguation)
