= David Shrier =

American, futurist and author

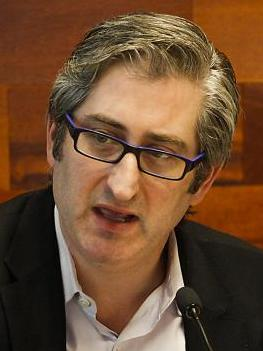
- Shrier speaking at Asian Banker Summit
- Education: Brown University
- Occupations: Entrepreneur, author Professor of Practice, Imperial College London; Associate Fellow, Oxford University
- Website: http://VisionaryFuture.com/

David L. Shrier is an American futurist, author and entrepreneur. Shrier also co-edits the MIT Connection Science imprint of MIT Press and is the author of various industry reference books in the fields of financial technology, digital identity, data governance and financial innovation. Shrier is the cofounder and managing director of Esme Learning, an artificial intelligence-enabled digital learning company derived from MIT research and spun out of MIT Media Lab. He currently serves as Professor of Practice in Artificial Intelligence and Innovation with Imperial College London.

== Career ==
Shrier has led a number of private equity and venture capital-backed companies as CEO, CFO or COO. He has helped established organizations to develop and build new revenue streams, having developed growth opportunities with C-suite executives for Dun & Bradstreet, Wolters Kluwer, Ernst & Young, GE, The Walt Disney Company, AOL Verizon, and Starwood, as well as private equity and venture capital funds. Shrier's professional interests includes managing a global consultancy firm Visionary Future, and serving as a non-executive director to blockchain infrastructure provider Copper.co and senior advisor to fintech company Kyriba. He was also vice chairman of Endor.

== Learning innovation ==
Shrier created the MIT online fintech course “Future Commerce” that educated thousands of students in over 120 countries, adapting his on-campus MIT graduate course of the same name (itself the first graduate fintech course in North America). In 2017, he re-created his online programme at University of Oxford's Saïd Business School (SBS) under the name Oxford Fintech, and added a second programme Oxford Blockchain Strategy. The dean of SBS teaches one of the modules in Oxford Fintech. Shrier also co-founded and is chairman of Riff Learning, an MIT spinout company that is applying artificial intelligence to reshape collaboration. Shrier is on the advisory board of WorldQuant University, a program offering a totally-free, accredited, online master's degree in financial engineering.

== Government and regulatory work ==
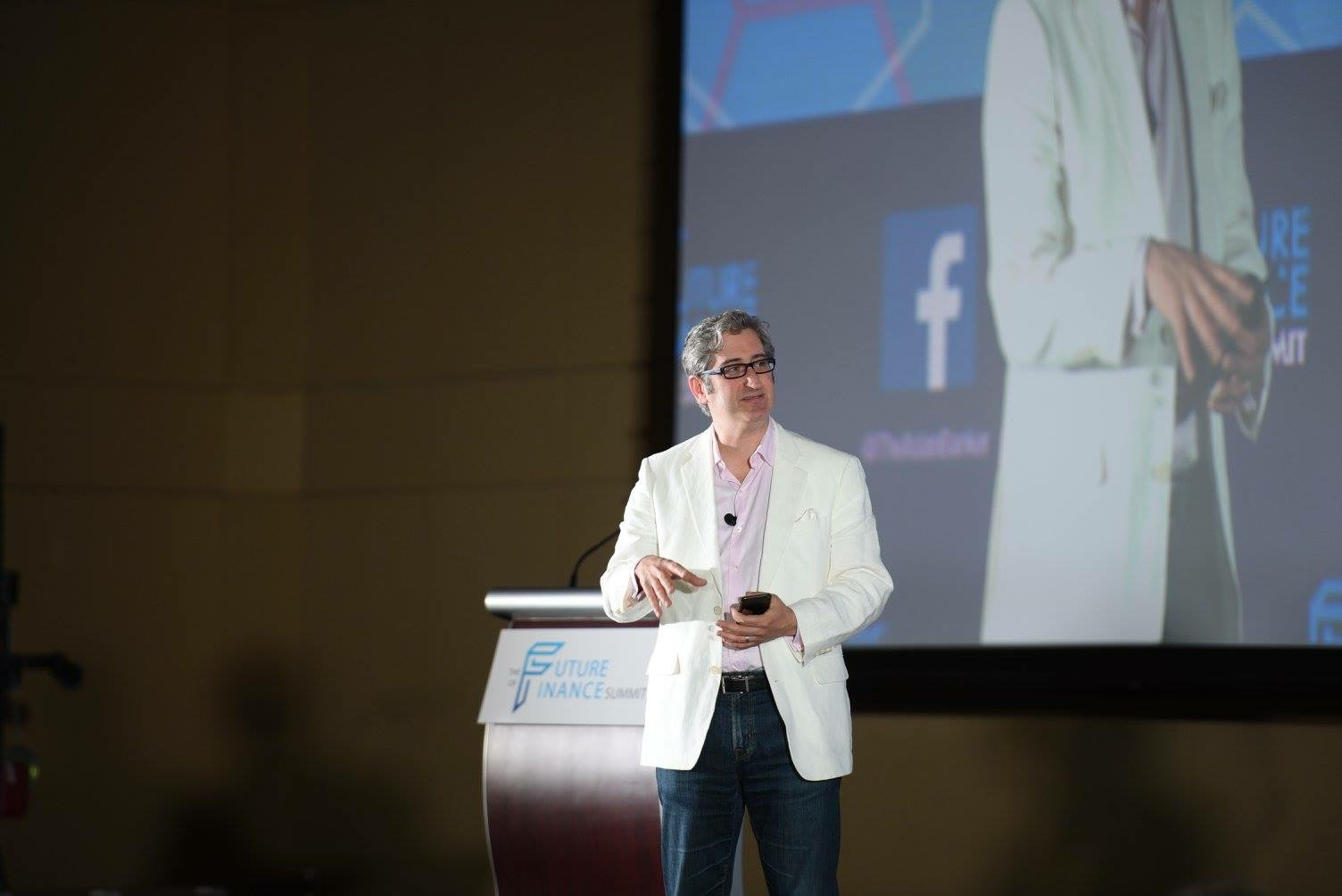
David Shrier Keynote address at Asian Banker Summit 2017

Shrier has collaborated with regulators and policymakers in the US, UK, EU, and through the OECD its member countries, to help shape emerging policy on disruptive technologies. He is presently a member of the FinTech Industry Committee for FINRA, the U.S. securities industry's self-regulatory body, a senior advisor to the UK Government’s HM Revenue and Customs, and the Fintech Trade & Investment Steering Board for the UK Government's Department of International Trade. David also advises the European Parliament, European Commission, and OECD on digital identity, AML/KYC, blockchain, and AI. He previously advised the European Commission on commercializing innovation with a focus on digital technology, and the Government of Dubai on blockchain and digital identity.

== Academia ==
Shrier has dual academic appointment as Professor of Practice (Artificial Intelligence and Innovation) with Imperial College Business School, Imperial College London, and Associate Fellow with the Said Business School, University of Oxford. He was previously a Lecturer at the MIT Media Lab; and Fellow with the Payne Institute at the Colorado School of Mines. Shrier has written for numerous publications including Forbes, CNBC, Newsweek, and The Asian Banker. He also co-edits the MIT Connection Science imprint of MIT Press and is the author of various industry reference books:

=== Books ===
- Frontiers of Financial Technology, New Solutions for Cybersecurity (with Alex Pentland) (2016)
- Trust::Data: A New Framework for Identity and Data Sharing (2016)
- New Solutions for Cybersecurity (MIT Connection Science and Engineering) (2018)
- Basic Blockchain: What It Is and How It Will Transform the Way We Work and Live (2020)
- Augmenting Your Career: How to Win at Work In the Age of AI (2021)
