= Stephen Dycus =

Stephen Dycus (born 1941) is an American professor of National Security Law at the Vermont Law School.

== Biography ==
Dycus obtained his bachelor's degree from the Southern Methodist University in 1963 and two years later got Bachelor of Laws degree at the same school. In 1976 he got his Master of Laws degree from Harvard University and the same year became faculty member of the Vermont Law School. From 1983 to 1984 he was a visiting scholar at Boalt Hall School of Law at the University of California, Berkeley and by 1991 held the same position at the Natural Resources Defense Council in Washington, D.C. From 1991 to 1992 he was a visiting professor at the United States Military Academy and in 1997 worked at the Petrozavodsk State University in Karelia, Russia.

Later on, for four years he was a member of the Vermont Water Resources Board, National Academies and the American Law Institute. Dycus was a consultant to the United States Department of Energy and was a founder and chairman of the National Security Law Section, a division of the Association of American Law Schools. He is also an author of National Security Law and Counterterrorism Law among other works.
