= Lynn Schreyer =

American applied mathematician

- Citizenship: American

Academic background
- Education: University of New Mexico (BS); Northwestern University (MS); Purdue University (PhD)
- Thesis: Multiscale Hybrid Mixture Theory for Swelling Systems with Interfaces (1994)
- Doctoral advisor: Jim Douglas Jr.; John H. Cushman

Academic work
- Discipline: Mathematician
- Sub-discipline: Applied mathematics; Fluid and solid mechanics
- Institutions: University of Colorado Denver; Washington State University

Lynn G. Schreyer (formerly Lynn Laverne Schreyer Bennethum) is an American applied mathematician whose research concerns the mathematical modeling of porous media. She is associate professor of mathematics and statistics at Washington State University, and full professor of the department of mathematics and statistics at Washington State University in March 2021. Schreyer server as chair of the Society for Industrial and Applied Mathematics Activity Group on Geosciences from 2004 to 2006.

== Education and career ==
Schreyer studied mechanical engineering at the University of New Mexico, graduating magna cum laude in 1986. After earning a master's degree in mechanical engineering at Northwestern University in 1988, she switched to mathematics, earning a second master's degree in 1990 and a Ph.D. in 1994, both from Purdue University. Her dissertation, Multiscale Hybrid Mixture Theory for Swelling Systems with Interfaces, was jointly supervised by Jim Douglas Jr. and John H. Cushman.

After postdoctoral research in agronomy at Purdue, Schreyer became an assistant professor of mathematics at the University of Colorado Denver, earning tenure there as an associate professor in 2002. She moved to her present position at Washington State University in 2016.

Schreyer chaired the Society for Industrial and Applied Mathematics (SIAM) Activity Group on Geosciences (SIAG-GS) from 2004 to 2006.
