= Vermont Law Review =

- Discipline: Law
- Language: English
- Edited by: Isabella M. Pickett, Faith M. Orr

Publication details
- History: 1976–present
- Publisher: Vermont Law School (United States)
- Frequency: Quarterly

Standard abbreviations
- Bluebook: Vt. L. Rev.
- ISO 4: Vt. Law Rev.

Indexing
- ISSN: 0145-2908
- LCCN: 76649668
- OCLC no.: 60356283

Links
- Journal homepage; Online archives

The Vermont Law Review is a law review edited and published by students at Vermont Law School. The journal primarily publishes scholarly articles and student notes. It is one of two journals published by the school, alongside the Vermont Journal of Environmental Law. It was founded by Vermont State Superior Court Judge Mary Miles-Teachout in 1976.

The Law Review is published quarterly. It hosts an annual symposium, each focusing on discussion of a timely legal issue, often covering environmental or Vermont-specific law.

== Notable Contributors ==
- David Orgon Coolidge, Beyond Baker: The Case for a Vermont Marriage Amendment, 25 Vt. L. Rev. 61 (2000).
- Robin Kundis Craig, Adapting to Climate Change: The Potential Role of State Common-Law Public Trust Doctrines, 34 Vt. L. Rev. 781 (2010).
- Nicole Stelle Garnett, Justice Scalia's Rule of Law and Law of Takings, 41 Vt. Law Rev. 717 (2017).
- Denise R. Johnson, Reflections on the Bundle of Rights, 32 Vt. L. Rev. 247 (2007).
- Ellen Podgor, "What Kind of a Mad Prosecutor" Brought Us This White-Collar Case?, 41 Vt. L. Rev. 521 (2017).
- Frank Pommersheim, Tribal Court Jurisprudence: A Snapshot from the Field, 21 Vt. L. Rev. 7 (1996).
- George P. Smith II, Re-Validating the Doctrine of Anticipatory Nuisance, 29 Vt. L. Rev. 687 (2005).
- David M. Smolin, Child Laundering as Exploitation: Applying Anti-Trafficking Norms to Intercountry Adoption under the Coming Hague Regime, 32 Vt. L. Rev. 1 (2007).
- Cass Sunstein, Some Effects of Moral Indignation on Law, 33 Vt. L. Rev. 405 (2009).
- Steven M. Wise, Hardly a Revolution-The Eligibility of Nonhuman Animals for Dignity-Rights in a Liberal Democracy, 22 Vt. L. Rev. 793 (1998).
- Mary Christina Wood, The Tribal Property Right to Wildlife Capital (Part II): Asserting a Sovereign Servitude to Protect Habitat of Imperiled Species, 25 Vt. L. Rev. 355 (2001).
