= Shirley Jefferson =

American law school administrator and professor

Shirley A. Jefferson
- Born: 1953 (age 71–72)
- Education: Vermont Law School
- Occupation(s): Associate dean and faculty member
- Employer: Vermont Law and Graduate School

Shirley A. Jefferson (born 1953) is an American law school administrator and faculty member. She serves as vice president of community engagement and government relations and associate law professor at Vermont Law and Graduate School. A native of Selma, Alabama, who marched to Montgomery as a child, Jefferson is a frequent public speaker on race-related issues, and has pushed for the removal a controversial mural depicting slavery from the Vermont Law School student center since 2020.

In 2019, the National Black Pre-Law Conference for Legal Education Access recognized Jefferson with its Legal Education Access and Diversity Champion Award. In 2022, the Vermont Law School Alumni Association named the Dean Shirley Jefferson Distinguished Service Award after her.

== Early life and education ==
The daughter of a truck driver in Selma, Alabama, Shirley Jefferson was one of nine children, and grew up attending segregated public schools. In March 1965, at the age of 12, she joined the third march from Selma to Montgomery for voting rights, along with Dr. Martin Luther King Jr. and Congressman John Lewis. Her mother died when she was 15 years old. When she was 17, she integrated her high school.

After finishing high school, Jefferson moved to Baltimore and worked at McDonald's, and was promoted to manager. She then worked at a supermarket, first as a cashier and then in an office role. Eventually deciding to become a lawyer, she enrolled in Southeastern University in Washington, D.C., while continuing to work for the supermarket.

Jefferson received a Bachelor of Science from Southeastern University in 1981, graduating summa cum laude and finishing second in her class. She then accepted an offer to attend Vermont Law School in South Royalton, Vermont, which had begun actively recruiting minority applicants. Only the second African American woman to attend VLS, she struggled initially because her education during segregation had left her poorly prepared for law school. One of her professors, Gil Jukovich, intervened and became a mentor to her.

Jefferson earned her Juris Doctor degree in 1986. While a law student, she interned at the NAACP Legal Defense Fund in New York. She also worked with the VLS South Royalton Legal Clinic, and assisted with the case of Bela Kendall, who initiated a lawsuit against the federal government for terminating her worker's compensation payments without enough notice to respond; the case eventually turned into a class action lawsuit.

== Career ==
After law school, Jefferson returned to Washington, D.C., and worked as legislative assistant to Councilwoman Wilhelmina J. Rolark. She went on to join Rolark's law firm as an associate. Jefferson then served as general counsel for the United Black Fund, and helped to organize activities in 30 communities.

In 1999, Jefferson returned to Vermont to become alumni relations for Vermont Law School. In 2001, she was named interim assistant dean for student affairs, also chairing the law school's diversity committee. She currently serves as associate dean and on the faculty as an associate professor, teaching Race and the Law. As associate dean, she has advised the Student Bar Association and 60 other organizations. As of 2019, the entering class at VLS was 53 percent female, was 31 percent people of color.

In 2021, Jefferson was appointed to the board of trustees of the Vermont State Colleges System. In 2022, she was appointed vice president for community engagement and government affairs at Vermont Law and Graduate School.

=== Mural controversy ===
After George Floyd was murdered by a police officer in Minnesota in 2020, Jefferson decided to push for the removal of a mural depicting slavery in the Vermont Law School student center. Painted from 1993 to 1994 by Quebec artist Sam Kerson, the mural includes scenes of a slave market, and a white slaveowner wielding a whip over a group of black men. Since joining the law school staff in 1999, Jefferson had periodically received complaints from students expressing their discomfort with the mural, but typically told them to focus on their education rather than being distracted by the artwork. In 2013 and 2014, the VLS Diversity Committee discussed the objections to the mural, and installed plaques to explain its original intent to condemn slavery.

In May 2020, students circulated a petition calling for the removal of the mural, due to the way in which the African American figures were depicted, with exaggerated features which were "degrading" and resembled "caricatures designed to perpetuate the white superiority views that have been embedded on our entire societal structure". Jefferson contacted the dean and received support for the mural's removal, resulting in a lengthy legal fight with the artist, who has sued to stop Vermont Law School from covering the mural permanently.

== Personal life ==
During her third year of college, Jefferson became a single mother and started raising a son.
