= A. M. Schreyer =

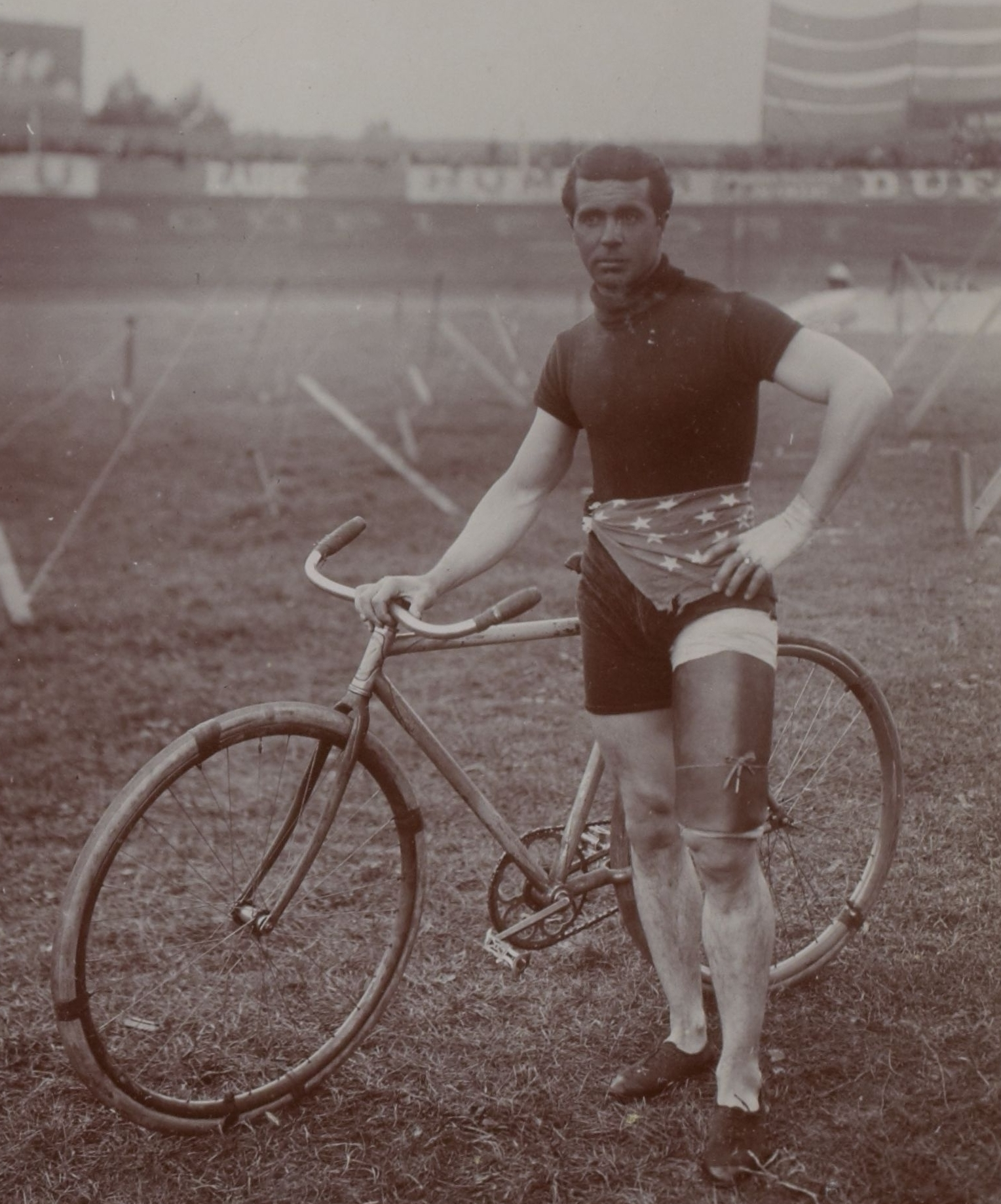
Max Schreyer

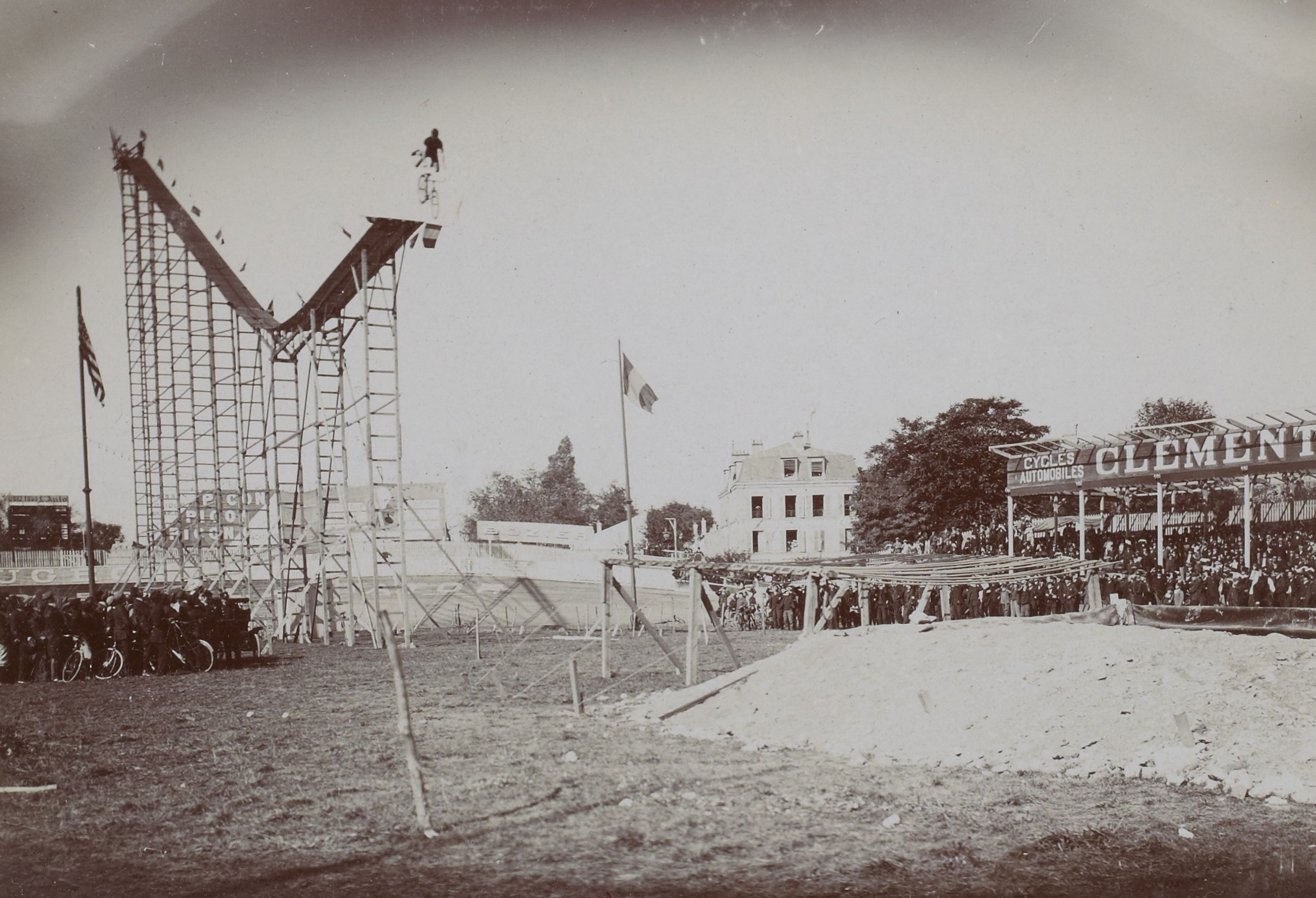
Schreyer in the Paris Buffalo Velodrome in September 1906

A. M. (Max) Schreyer (died May 30, 1919), known as Daredevil Schreyer, was an American daredevil cyclist and athlete. Between 1895 and 1919 he traveled the world performing a particular feat. Cycling down a chute he would propel himself from the bicycle just before the machine left the chute, dive forward through the air and land head first in a tank containing three feet of water. The chute was built afresh of timber at every venue. Starting at a height of 103 ft (31 m), the chute declined at an angle of 35 degree before curving upwards. The small water tank was placed approximately 100 ft (30 m) from the end of the chute. He appeared across the USA, Canada and Europe, performing in New York, Paris and London.

In 1902 Laurent J. Tonnelle dedicated his March and Two Step "To My Friend A. M. Schreyer, Mile a Minute Aerial Cyclist in his Dare Devil ride 'Down the Chute'."

During World War I Schreyer supported the United War Work Campaign. On May 25, 1919, Schreyer performed the feat for the last time at Van Cortlandt Park in New York in front of 20,000 people, including his wife and infant son. He struck the side of the tank, was fatally injured, and lingered for a few days before dying in Fordham Hospital, New York on May 30.

At the time of his death the Schreyers lived at 278 Palisade Avenue, North Hoboken.
