= Shirley Borhauer =

American politician

Member of the Arkansas House of Representatives from the 98th district
- In office January 13, 2003 – January 8, 2007
- Preceded by: Barbara King
- Succeeded by: Donna Hutchinson

Member of the Arkansas House of Representatives from the 4th district
- In office January 8, 2001 – January 13, 2003
- Preceded by: Geoff Buchanan
- Succeeded by: Russell Bennett

Personal details
- Born: Shirley Ursala Czosek; October 2, 1926 Chicago, Illinois
- Died: December 10, 2013 (aged 87) Chicago, Illinois
- Party: Republican

Shirley Ursala Borhauer (née Czosek; October 2, 1926 – December 10, 2013) was an American politician. She served in the Arkansas House of Representatives from 2001 to 2007.

== Early life ==
Borhauer was born Shirley Ursala Czosek on October 2, 1926, in Chicago, Illinois. Her parents were Edmund Stanislaw Czosek, a machinery operator for the Felt and Tarrant Manufacturing Company, and Clara Victoria Mindikowski Czosek, a Democratic election official. She was the youngest child, with one older sister, Phillis Mildred Czosek Black. She attended local public schools and graduated from Blue Island High School in 1944.

== Political career ==
Borhauer contested a race to replace Thomas Fitzpatrick as alderman for the 19th ward in Chicago in the 1975 election. She ran for a seat in the Arkansas House of Representatives in the 2000 general election and was elected for a seat representing district 4 at the age of 74. She sponsored a successful constitutional amendment that would allow bingos and raffles to be used for charitable purposes.
