= National Nurses United =

US organization of registered nurses

- Wisconsin protests, 2011
- Founded: 2009
- Type: Labor union
- Headquarters: Oakland, California
- Location: United States
- Field: Nursing
- Members: 225,000
- Key people: Puneet Maharaj (Executive Director), Nancy Hagans, Jamie Brown, Cathy Kennedy, Mary Turner (Presidents)
- Affiliations: AFL–CIO
- Website: nationalnursesunited.org

National Nurses United (NNU) is the largest organization of registered nurses in the United States. With more than 225,000 members, it is the farthest-reaching union and professional association of registered nurses in the U.S. Founded in 2009 through the merging of the California Nurses Association/National Nurses Organizing Committee, the United American Nurses, and the Massachusetts Nurses Association, the NNU focuses on amplifying the voice of direct care RNs and patients in national policy. The union's policy positions include the enactment of safe nurse-to-patient ratios, patient advocacy rights at the Executive and State level, and legislation for single-payer health care to secure "quality healthcare for all, as a human right." The organization's goal is to "organize all direct care RNs into a single organization capable of exercising influence over the healthcare industry, governments, and employers."

== Leadership ==
The executive director of the national organization, which is affiliated with the AFL–CIO, is labor leader Puneet Maharaj, who also heads the 90,000-member California Nurses Association, and the National Nurses Organizing Committee. The former executive directors include RoseAnn DeMoro, who served as National Vice President and Executive Board Member of the AFL–CIO, and Bonnie Castillo.

== Activities ==
=== Single-payer health care ===
The organization backs a Medicare for All single-payer healthcare plan for the United States.

To support a single-payer system, NNU leadership mobilized large-scale demonstrations demanding single-payer healthcare be included in the platform at the 2016 Democratic National Convention.

=== Occupy Wall Street ===
National Nurses United has held numerous protests, including one in front of the U.S. Chamber of Commerce and another on Wall Street, to protest privatization and profiteering in the health care industry.

NNU supports a tax on financial transactions, which the organization says could raise at least $350 billion a year.

=== Support for Bernie Sanders ===
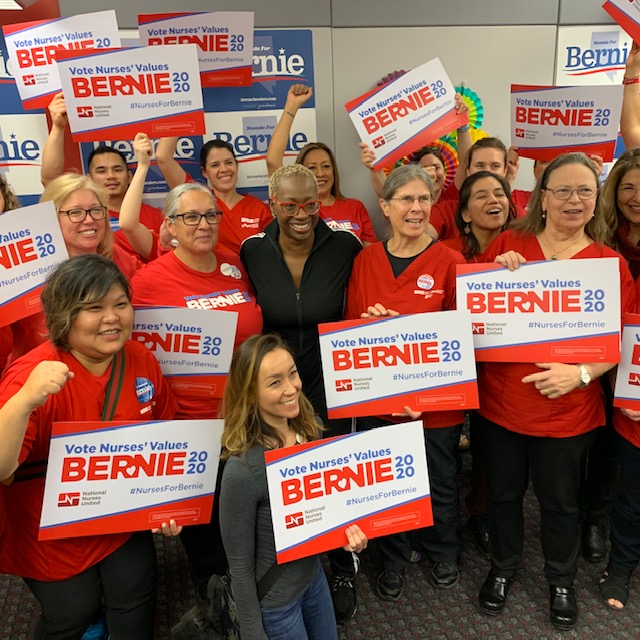
February 21, 2020, Las Vegas. One Day Before Nevada Caucus. NNU with former Ohio lawmaker Nina Turner, advisor to Bernie Sanders for President 2020 campaign.

In The New York Times on January 28, 2016, Nicholas Confessore reported, "According to Federal Election Commission records [NNU's] 'super PAC' has spent close to $1 million on ads and other support for Democratic presidential candidate Bernie Sanders". The NNU spending was classified as "Expressly advocating the election or defeat of a clearly identified candidate." In 2019, NNU officially endorsed Sanders for the 2020 Democratic presidential nomination.

=== Week of action to honor Alex Pretti ===
In January 2026, NNU called for a week of candlelight vigils to honor and seek justice for the killing of Alex Pretti, a nurse who was fatally shot by United States Customs and Border Protection agents in Minneapolis. Vigils were held in Augusta, Georgia, Aurora, Colorado, Austin, Chicago, Cincinnati, Corpus Christi, Durham, El Paso, Kansas City, Las Vegas, Modesto, Roseville, Sacramento, San Diego, San Francisco, and Wichita.

== History ==
=== United American Nurses ===
UAN logo

Founded in 1999, it only represented registered nurses (RNs). In 2009, UAN merged with the California Nurses Association/National Nurses Organizing Committee and Massachusetts Nurses Association to form NNU.

=== New York State Nurses Association ===
The New York State Nurses Association (NYSNA) voted to join NNU as an affiliate in October 2022, increasing NNU's total membership to nearly 225,000.

== See also ==
- California Nurses Association
