= Shirley Barlow =

British academic

Shirley Ann Barlow is a classicist specialising in the study of Classical drama and was one of the founding members of the Department of Classics at the University of Kent. One of her former students is comedian Alan Davies. She was an Honorary Fellow of University College London.

== Career ==
Barlow completed her PhD thesis on "The Visual Imagery of Euripides" in 1964, as an external student at the University of London. She started at the University of Kent in 1965 as a Lecturer in Classics, and one of the founding members of the department of Classics. Prior to this appointment she had worked at the University of Michigan, and was persuaded to return to the UK by the chance to work at a brand new university. She eventually gained promotion to Senior Lecturer and was, subsequently, head of the Classics department there. She was Master of Eliot College, Kent between 1985 and 1990, and a seminar room in Eliot College is named after her. In this role she was also responsible for commissioning the mural A Canterbury Chronicle by Oliver Postgate, which was hung in the college in 1992. Barlow had proposed the subject of the mural, a "light-hearted depiction of the history of East Kent... and Canterbury."

One of her students in 1986 was the comedian Alan Davies who described Barlow, in his 2009 book My favourite people and me: 1978-1988, as the best teacher he had at Kent whilst describing her as "engaging, and knowledgeable and [someone who] inspired commitment to her subject, classical drama".

Barlow was a member of the Soroptimist International organisation and acted as the president of the Canterbury branch in 1986-1987. She was awarded an Honorary Fellowship to the University College London in 1988.

== Selected publications ==
- Barlow, S. A. 1971. The Imagery of Euripides. London.
- Barlow, S. A. 1981. "Sophocles' Ajax and Euripides' Heracles", Ramus 10(2), 112-128.
- Barlow, S. A. 1982. "Structure and Dramatic Realism in Euripides' Heracles", Greece & Rome 29(2) 115-125.
- Barlow, S. A. 1986. Euripides Trojan Women. Warminster, Aris & Phillips.
- Barlow, S. A. 1989. "Stereotype and Reversal in Euripides' Medea", Greece & Rome 36(2), 158-171.
- Barlow, S. A. 1996. Euripides: Heracles. Warminster, Aris & Phillips.
