= Scheier =

Scheier is a surname. Notable people with the name include:

- Adam Scheier (born 1973), American football coach
- Edwin Scheier (1910–2008), American artist
- Jacob Scheier (born 1980), Canadian poet
- Libby Scheier (1946–2000), Canadian poet and short story writer
- Mary Scheier (1908–2007), American ceramicist
- Mindy Scheier (born 1971), American fashion designer
- Monique Scheier-Schneider, (born 1954) Luxembourg ice hockey administrator
- Shirley Scheier (born 1953), American artist
