= John Shurley (disambiguation) =

John Shurley (died 1527), was an English noble.

John Shurley may also refer to:

- John Shurley (died 1616), MP for Lewes and Lostwithiel
- John Shurley (died 1631), MP for Sussex, Bramber, Steyning and East Grinstead

== See also ==
- John Shirley (disambiguation)
