= Shrayer =

Shrayer is a surname. Notable people with the surname include:

- David Shrayer-Petrov (born 1936), Russian American novelist, poet, memoirist, translator and medical scientist
- Maxim D. Shrayer (born 1967), Russian-American author, translator, and literary scholar
- Michael Shrayer, American creator of the Electric Pencil in 1976, the first word processor for home computers

== See also ==
- Schreyer
- Scheier
- Shroyer
