= Shirley S. Kastor =

American politician (1895–1936)

Member of the Wyoming House of Representatives from the Uinta County district
- In office 1927–1931 Serving with Earl D. Cross (1929–1931)

Personal details
- Born: Shirley Sidney Kastor; 1895
- Died: April 13, 1936 (aged 41) Rochester, Minnesota, U.S.
- Party: Republican
- Parent(s): Mr. and Mrs. I. Kastor
- Profession: Politician

Shirley Sidney Kastor (1895 – April 13, 1936) was an American politician who served in the Wyoming House of Representatives from 1927 to 1931, (Note: According to the Wyoming Legislature, Kastor served from 1927 to 1929.) representing Uinta County as a Republican in the 19th and 20th Wyoming Legislatures.

== Early life and education ==
Kastor was born in 1895 as the youngest of four children to Mr. and Mrs. I. Kastor. He attended schools in Evanston, Wyoming. He graduated from high school, as well as a business college in Boston.

== Career ==
Prior to entering politics, Kastor worked with his father in the clothing business for a number of years.

Kastor served in the Wyoming House of Representatives from 1927 to 1931, representing Uinta County as a Republican in the 19th and 20th Wyoming Legislatures.

== Death ==
Kastor died at the age of 41 at the Mayo Brothers Clinic in Rochester, Minnesota on April 13, 1936, having been there since February of that year.

== Notes ==
Wyoming House of Representatives
Preceded by —	Member of the Wyoming House of Representatives from the Uinta County district 1927–1931; Served alongside: Earl D. Cross (1929–1931)	Succeeded by —
