= Vermont Law and Graduate School =

Private college in South Royalton, Vermont, US

- Motto: Lex pro urbe et orbe ("Law for the Community and the World")
- Established: 1972; 54 years ago
- School type: Private law school
- Dean: Beth McCormack
- Location: South Royalton, Vermont, United States; 43°49′18″N 72°31′16″W
- Enrollment: 722
- Faculty: 109
- USNWR ranking: 154th (tie) (2026)
- Bar pass rate: 67.9% (2025 first-time takers)
- Website: www.vermontlaw.edu/

Vermont Law and Graduate School (VLGS) is a private law and public policy graduate school in South Royalton, Vermont. It is the only ABA-accredited law school in the state. It offers several degrees, including Juris Doctor (JD), Master of Laws (LLM) in Environmental Law, Master of Public Policy (MPP) with multiple tracks, and masters in environmental policy and restorative justice, and dual degrees with a diverse range of institutions. According to the school's 2025 ABA-required disclosures, 69.2% of the Class of 2025 obtained full-time, long-term, JD-required employment nine months after graduation.

== History ==
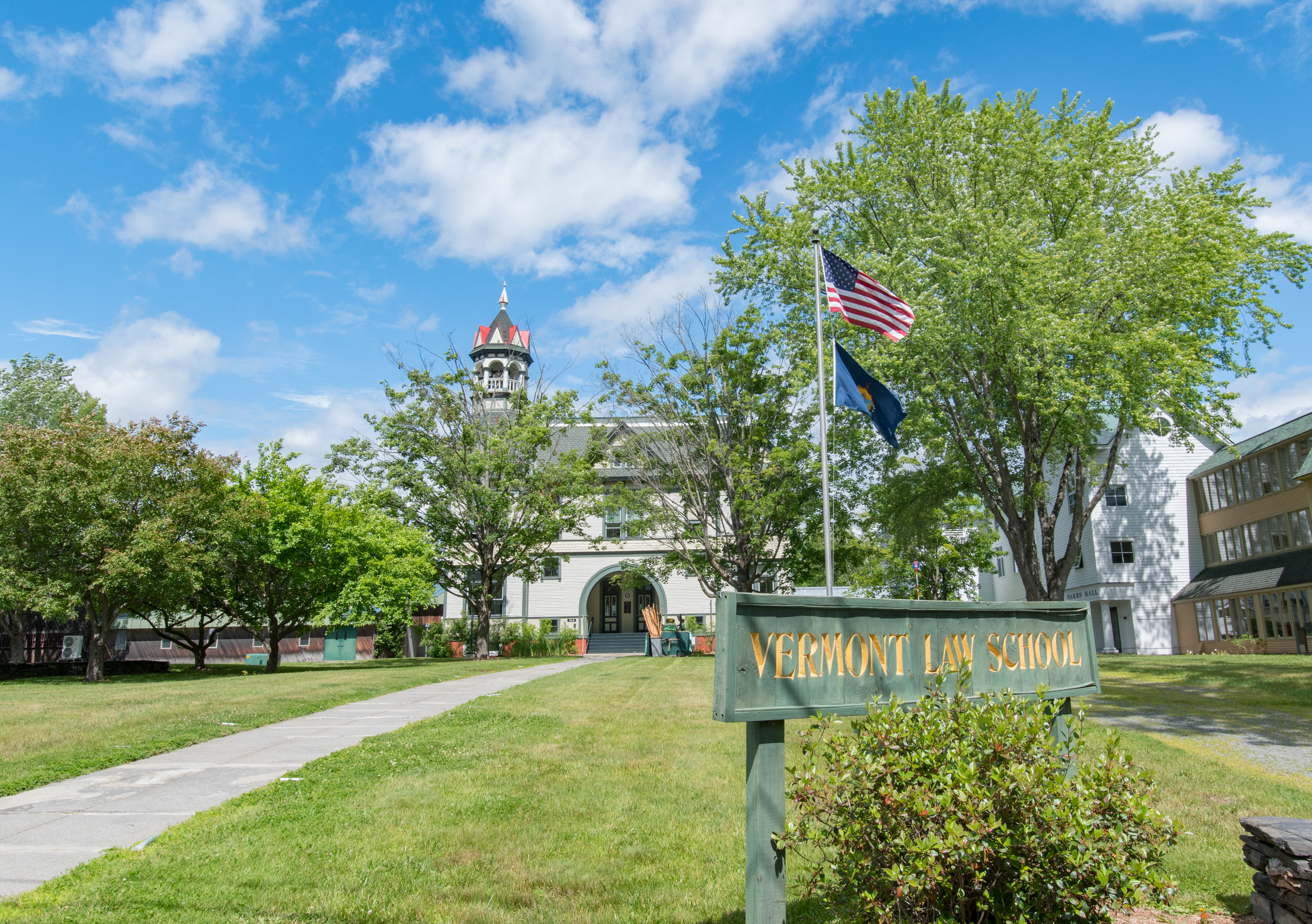
Debevoise Hall

=== Founding ===
Vermont Law School was founded in 1972 by Anthony Doria and held its first classes in the summer of 1973 with 113 students in what was then known as the old South Royalton schoolhouse. One of the founding professors was Alan Weinberger. In December 1973, VLS was certified by the Vermont State Board of Education as an institution of higher learning. Doria resigned as dean of the school in 1974, after it emerged that he had been convicted of embezzlement by a Pennsylvania court in 1960, though the charges were later vacated. A full complement of classes were offered in the fall of 1975 after provisional ABA accreditation. The Law School's first class graduated in spring 1976.

=== Since 2000 ===
From 1982 until 2011, Vermont Law School, along with William Mitchell College of Law, was one of two law schools in the U.S. to decline to receive federal funding under the Solomon Amendment, which required colleges and universities to allow military recruitment on campus or risk losing federal funding. The school is also part of FAIR Forum for Academic and Institutional Rights, a consortium of 38 law schools and law faculties that challenged the Solomon Amendment in Rumsfeld v. FAIR and lost. Following the repeal of 'Don't Ask Don't Tell' in 2011, the school has allowed military recruitment on campus.

In 2018, the law school controversially stripped tenure from 75% of its faculty, citing financial exigencies. Vermont Law School was subsequently sanctioned by the American Association of University Professors for "serious departures by the administration and/or governing board from generally accepted standards of college and university government". Vermont Law and Graduate School has challenged many of the findings of the report.

In 2022, the school added graduate programs and was renamed Vermont Law and Graduate School and also added a hybrid online JD program.

== Academics ==
Vermont Law School was provisionally ABA accredited in 1975, and full approval in 1978. It has also been accredited by the New England Association of Schools and Colleges (NEASC) since 1980. VLS became a member of the Association of American Law Schools (AALS) in 1981.

Vermont Law School also offers an Accelerated Juris Doctor program that allows JD students to graduate in just two years (as opposed to the traditional three-year JD program), through the completion of two full-time academic semesters during the summer.

As well as the Juris Doctor (JD), the Law School offers several degrees and joint-degrees, as well as degrees with other universities. Degrees include Master of Laws (LLM) in American Legal Studies, Environmental Law, Food and Agriculture Law, Energy Law, and Animal Law.

In 2022, the ABA's Section of Legal Education and Admissions to the Bar determined VLGS had failed to significantly comply with Standard 316, which was revised in 2019 to provide that at least 75% of an accredited law school's graduates who took a bar exam must pass one within two years of graduation. Graduates in 2019 had a 67.54% bar pass rate. However, VLGS had an 82.84% pass rate in 2018, and the school described the 2019 results as an anomaly. The ABA determined the school was back in compliance by March 2023.

=== Joint programs ===
The Law School has partnered with different domestic and international universities to offer dual-degree programs. Domestic schools include: Yale School of the Environment (JD/Master of Environmental Management), Tuck School of Business at Dartmouth (MELP/Master of Business Administration), the University of Vermont Rubenstein School of Natural Resources (MELP/Master of Science in Natural Resources), the University of South Carolina (MELP/JD), and the University of South Dakota (MELP/JD). International universities include the University of Cambridge (JD/Master of Philosophy) and Cergy-Pontoise University (France).

=== Julien and Virginia Cornell Library ===
The Julien and Virginia Cornell Library opened in 1991. The library contains over 250,000 print volumes, including primary and secondary legal materials focusing on state, national, and international law. The library also possesses a collection of microforms including congressional documents, state session laws, and briefs. The library's electronic collection includes access to LexisNexis and Westlaw and other online gateways and databases, as well as a large catalog of full-text electronic journals and books and databases offering primary legal materials.

Vermont Law School maintains "an extensive interdisciplinary environmental collection, including journals, monographs, electronic resources, and other material related to the study of the environment and environmental law and policy."

== Leadership ==
=== Deans ===
1. Anthony Doria (1972–1974)
2. Thomas M. Debevoise (1974–1982)
3. Jonathon Chase (1982–1987)
4. Douglas M. Costle (1987–1991)
5. Maximilian Kempner (1991–1996)
6. L. Kinvin Wroth (1996–2004)
7. Geoffrey Shields (2004–2012)
8. Marc Mihaly (2012–2016)
9. Thomas McHenry (2017–2021)
10. Beth McCormack (2021–present)

=== Presidents ===
1. L. Kinvin Wroth (2003–2004)
2. Geoffrey Shields (2004–2012)
3. Marc Mihaly (2012–2016)
4. Thomas McHenry (2017–2021)
5. Beth McCormack (2021–2022) interim
6. Rodney A. Smolla (2022–2025)
7. Melissa Hoffer (beginning December 2026)

== Campus ==
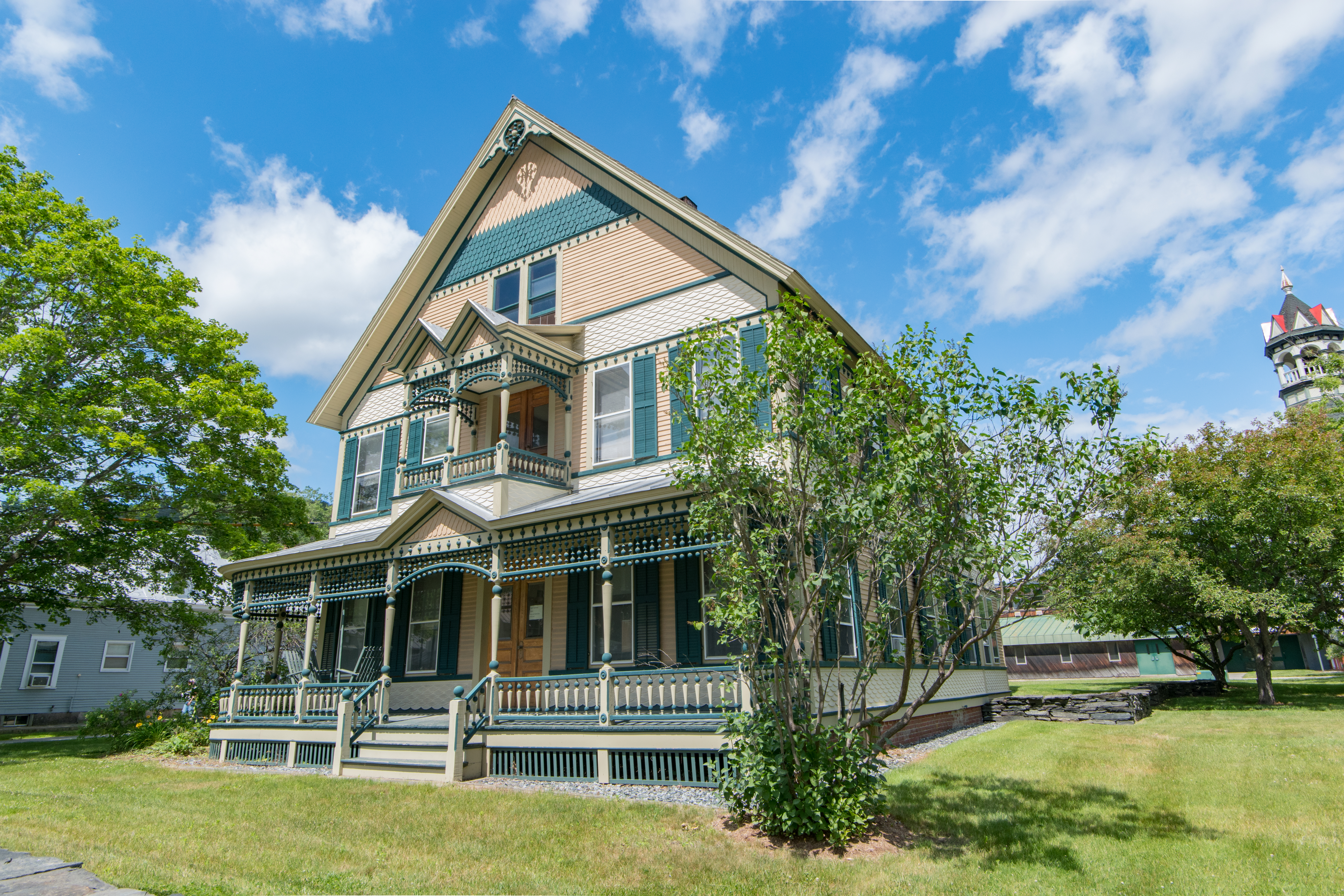
Abbott House

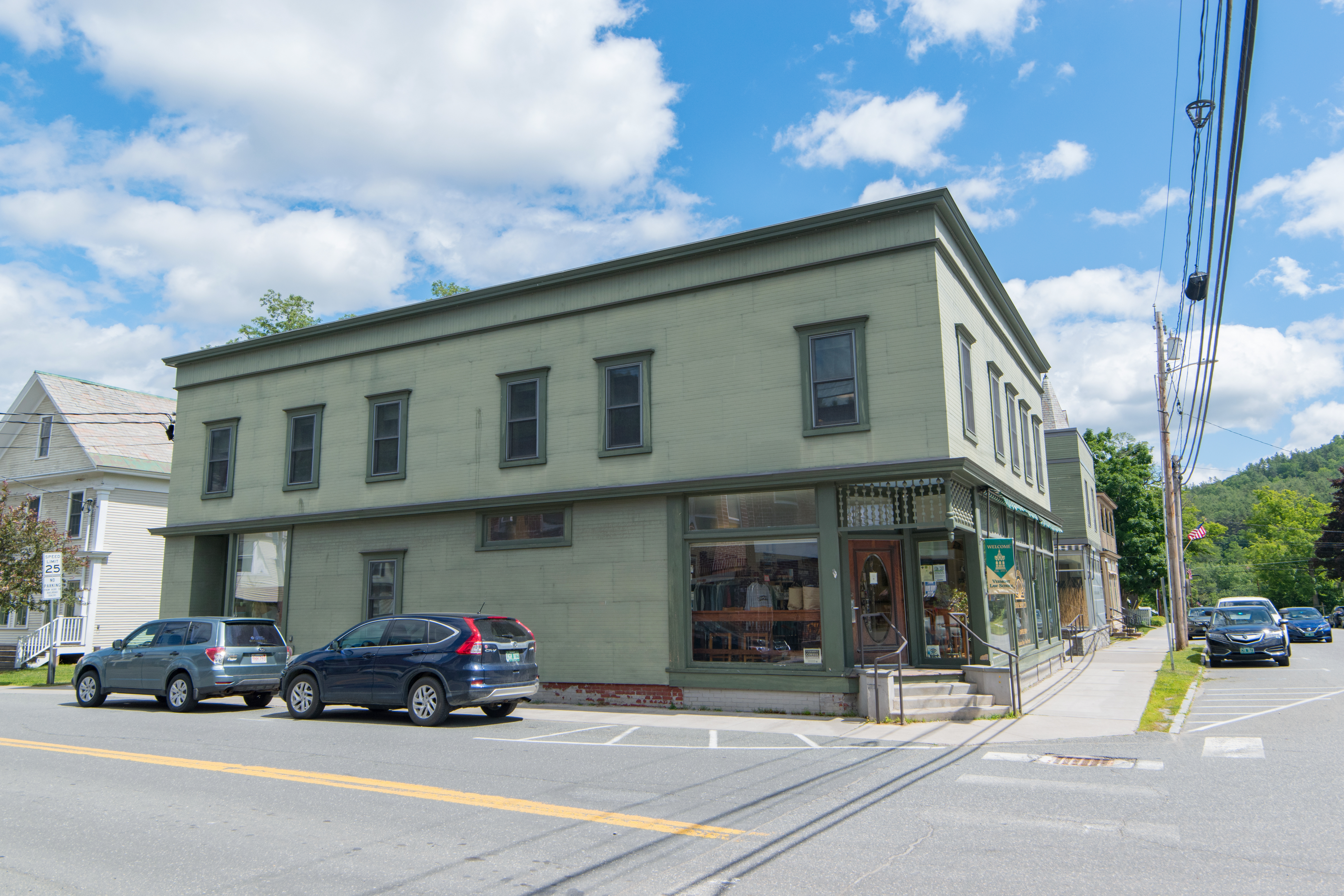
Center for Legal Services and campus bookstore

Vermont Law and Graduate School's 13-acre (5.3 ha) campus is located in South Royalton in central Vermont. The campus is set just above the broad banks of the White River.

The oldest and centermost classroom building on the campus is Debevoise Hall, the town's original schoolhouse, built in 1892. In 2005 the former town schoolhouse (the original Law School building in 1973) was renovated and renamed after one of the first deans of the Law School, Thomas M. Debevoise. Practicing what it preaches, the Law School emphasized environmental concerns in the renovation, as well as historical preservation and design efficiency. Debevoise Hall was the only LEED Silver Certified renovation building project in the state of Vermont. Debevoise Hall continues to serve as classroom space and now also houses administration offices, the Environmental Law Center, and the Yates Common Room.

The James L. and Evelena S. Oakes Hall building was constructed and dedicated in 1998. Oakes Hall incorporates "green building" techniques along with the latest classroom technology.

Jonathon Chase, the late former dean of the Law School, liked to joke that South Royalton was the only town in America "with a law school and no stop light." Vermont Law School holds the distinction of being the law school farthest from a traffic light. As of 2026, South Royalton does not have a stoplight.

In January 2020, VLGS opened a new satellite office in Burlington, which hosts the school's immigration law clinic and an additional admissions office.

== Centers, institutes, clinics, and programs ==
=== Law centers and research institutes ===
- Environmental Law Center — The Environmental Law Center (ELC) began in 1978 with eight master's degree students. The ELC confers both the Master of Environmental Law and Policy (MELP) and Master of Laws in Environmental Law (LLM) degrees and is consistently top-ranked by U.S. News & World Report.
- Center for Agriculture and Food Systems (CAFS) — The Center for Agriculture and Food Systems (CAFS) trains the next generation of food and agriculture advocates and entrepreneurs, and to create innovative legal tools supporting the new food movement. VLGS offers a JD Certificate in Food and Agriculture, and both Master's and LLM degrees in Food and Agriculture Law and Policy. CAFS' diverse course offerings, law clinic and degree options make it the most comprehensive sustainable food, agriculture, and environmental law graduate program in the country. CAFS also publishes a variety of resources on food and agriculture policy topics.
- Institute for Energy & the Environment — The Institute for Energy and the Environment (IEE) is a national and international resource for energy law and policy. The Institute offers a full course curriculum and a certificate of concentration during the academic year and through its Energy Summer seminars; distributes scholarly, technical, and practical publications; provides forums and conferences for professional education and issue development; and serves as a center for graduate research on energy issues, with an environmental awareness. The Institute's research team is selected from top students in the energy and environmental programs at Vermont Law School.
- Environmental Tax Policy Institute — The Institute analyzes ways in which taxation can address environmental problems. As a resource for the public and private sectors, non-governmental organizations, the press and academia, the Institute seeks to better inform the public policy debate about the role of environmental taxes at the local, state and federal levels.
- Land Use Institute — The Land Use Institute (LUI) addresses intensifying land use law and policy issues at the local, national, and international levels that critically pertain to the development of a sustainable society. These issues include application of smart growth principles, ecological planning, affordable housing, flood hazard mitigation, improving the confluence of energy and land use regulatory decision-making and other permitting processes, and land conservation strategies. LUI works with VLS faculty and students, and other nonprofit legal and professional planning partners, to provide sound and innovative information, experience, and education to advance the practice of land use law and planning. This mission is served through direct support for local and regional planning agencies, forums and conferences for issue development, preparation of legislation affecting critical land use issues, education and training for state and local land use planners and regulators, practical and scholarly publications, and graduate professional teaching.
- Animal Law and Policy Institute — The Animal Law and Policy Institute (ALPI) trains tomorrow’s animal advocacy leaders to advance animals’ legal status through education, scholarship, policy development, community engagement, and litigation. Engaging with advocacy organizations, communities, journalists, and policymakers, the Institute serves as a resource hub for animal law and policy issues. The ALPI is dedicated to supporting aspiring animal advocates through rigorous coursework, rewarding mentorships, as well as real-world trainings and experiences. They collaborate closely with the school’s other leading programs—including environmental law and policy, agriculture and food, and restorative justice—recognizing the interconnections between justice movements, animals, humans, and the environment.

=== Clinics and experiential programs ===
- Environmental Advocacy Clinic — The Environmental Advocacy Clinic assists major conservation organizations and local community groups to promote access to justice on important environmental and natural resources issues. In 2019, the National Wildlife Federation selected the Environmental Advocacy Clinic to represent the Federation on its national legal advocacy work.
- Environmental Justice Clinic — Launched in 2019, the Environmental Justice Clinic became one of the only law clinics specifically devoted to environmental justice, providing legal services to low income communities and communities of color fighting the unjust distribution of pollution sources within those areas.
- Energy Clinic—Started in 2014, the Energy Clinic is one of the only law clinics in the United States focused on promoting climate justice and renewable energy. The Energy Clinic provides opportunities for students to progressively develop the knowledge, skills, and values integral to the field of energy law and policy, while helping clients meet local energy needs with reliable, clean, and affordable resources.
- Food and Agriculture Clinic — Students in the Food and Agriculture Clinic collaborate with local, regional, national, and international partners, and engage in law and policy work that addresses challenges related to food and land justice, public health, the economy, food security, and animal welfare.
- South Royalton Legal Clinic — The South Royalton Legal Clinic serves Vermont residents who are unable to afford counsel and who need assistance with issues such as bankruptcy, children's rights, disability, domestic violence, family law, housing, immigration, veterans issues and wills.
- Legislative Clinic — In the Legislative Clinic, students to work under the supervision of attorneys supporting the work of the Vermont General Assembly. Under the supervision of the Vermont Legislative Council, students work on bills, amendments, and related research projects. They observe floor debates, attend committee hearings, and participate in hearings as needed by the committees.
- Immigration Clinic — Expanded alongside the opening of the Burlington satellite office in 2020, this clinic offers assistance to Vermonters on issues of immigration law.
- General Practice Program — The General Practice Program (GPP) was instituted in 1987. The GPP is recipient of the American Bar Association's E. Smythe Gambrell Award for Professionalism, a national award for law schools and other organizations in recognition for advancing professionalism in the practice of law.
- Legal Clinic of Petrozavodsk State University — Under the patronage of Vermont School of Law at the Faculty of Petrozavodsk State University opened the first legal clinic in Russia in 1994, supported by the Council of Judges.
- Farmed Animal Advocacy Clinic —Launched in 2022, the Farmed Animal Advocacy Clinic (FAAC) is the only legal clinic in the world dedicated to advancing legal protections for farmed animals. FAAC empowers students to become effective advocates for animals and develop the legal skills required to succeed in a variety of legal careers. Student clinicians gain hands-on experience through real-world matters assisting in representing clients in litigation, conducting policy analysis, and handling administrative matters—all with the aim of improving the treatment and legal status of farmed animals.

== Employment ==
According to Vermont Law School's official 2025 ABA-required disclosures, 69.2% of the Class of 2025 obtained full-time, long-term, JD-required employment nine months after graduation.

== Tuition and financial aid ==
Full-time JD tuition for 2025-2026 is $55,382.

== Publications ==
Vermont Law School students publish two legal journals, the Vermont Law Review and the Vermont Journal of Environmental Law, on a regular basis several times a year in print and online. In addition to regular publication, both journals sponsor annual symposia.

== Notable faculty ==
- Peter A. Bradford, professor at Vermont Law School, former member of the U.S. Nuclear Regulatory Commission
- Susan Buckholz, former adjunct instructor at Vermont Law School and former member of the Vermont House of Representatives
- Mark Cooper, senior research fellow for economic analysis at VLS' Institute for Energy and the Environment
- Stephen Dycus, professor of National Security Law at Vermont Law School
- Grant Gilmore, scholar of commercial law and one of the principal drafters of the Uniform Commercial Code, instructor at VLS
- Molly Gray, elected Lieutenant governor of Vermont in 2020 and 2026, instructor of international human rights law courses
- Shirley Jefferson, associate dean and professor at Vermont Law School
- Denise R. Johnson, first woman appointed to the Vermont Supreme Court, instructor in legal writing, 1978–1980
- Jonathan Lash, Vermont Commissioner of Environmental Conservation, Secretary of the Vermont Agency of Natural Resources, president of Hampshire College, professor at VLS
- Deborah Markowitz, Secretary of the Vermont Agency of Natural Resources, former Vermont Secretary of State, adjunct professor
- Michael McCann, sports journalist and law professor, director of the Sports Law Institute at Vermont Law School
- Robert D. Rachlin, partner in Downs Rachlin Martin PLLC, the state's largest law firm, professor at Vermont Law School
- Norman Redlich, Warren Commission researcher, VLS Board of Trustees (1977–1999)
- Benjamin K. Sovacool, founding Director of the Energy Security & Justice Program at VLS Institute for Energy and Environment
- Gus Speth, co-founder of Natural Resources Defense Council, professor from 2015 to 2020
- Steven M. Wise, former president of the Animal Legal Defense Fund and founder and president of the Nonhuman Rights Project, instructor at VLS

== Notable trustees ==
- Philip H. Hoff, 73rd governor of Vermont from 1936 to 1969, (1983–1999, Trustee Emeritus beginning in 1999)
- James L. Oakes, Judge of the United States Court of Appeals for the Second Circuit, (1976–1994)
- John W. Hennessey Jr., dean and professor at Dartmouth College, interim president of University of Vermont (1999–2007)

== Notable alumni ==
- Arnie Arnesen, J.D. 1981, member, New Hampshire House of Representatives (1985–1993), Democratic nominee for Governor of New Hampshire, 1992, candidate for United States House of Representatives, 1996
- Joe Benning, J.D. 1983, member of the Vermont Senate from 2011 to 2023
- Sarah E. Buxton, J.D. 2010, former member of the Vermont House of Representatives
- John J. Cavanaugh Jr., J.D./M.A. 2011, member of the Nebraska Legislature since 2021
- Karen Carroll, J.D. 1988, associate justice of the Vermont Supreme Court since 2017
- Thomas K. Clancy, J.D. 1980, professor emeritus at the University of Mississippi School of Law
- William D. Cohen, J.D. 1984, associate justice of the Vermont Supreme Court
- Harold "Duke" Eaton Jr., J.D. 1980, Vermont Supreme Court Associate Justice (2014–present)
- Amanda Gourgue MELP 2013, member of the New Hampshire House of Representatives from 2016 to 2022
- Vincent Illuzzi, J.D. 1978, youngest person ever elected to Vermont State Senate, State Senator 1981–2013, Essex County State's Attorney since 1998, unsuccessful 2012 Republican nominee for Vermont Auditor of Accounts
- Adam R. Lee, J.D. 2007, member of the Maine House of Representatives
- Chris Mathias, J.D. 2007, member of the Idaho House of Representatives beginning in 2020
- Elizabeth MacDonough, J.D. 1998, first woman to serve as Parliamentarian of the United States Senate
- Richard McCormack, M.S. 2002, member of the Vermont Senate
- Rodney McLain, J.D. 1987, U.S. Olympic canoe racer
- Charles A. Murphy, J.D. 1990, member of the Massachusetts House of Representatives and chairman of the House Ways and Means Committee
- Tamara Toles, J.D./MELP 2009, president, Environmental Grantmakers Association
- Sterry R. Waterman, J.D. 1977, Judge of the United States Court of Appeals for the Second Circuit
- Lucy Weber, J.D. 1985, member of the New Hampshire House of Representatives beginning in 2007 and Speaker pro tempore from 2018 to 2020
- Susanne R. Young, J.D. 1981, Vermont Attorney General from June 2022 to January 2023

== See also ==
- List of American institutions of higher education
- List of colleges and universities in Vermont
