= Tamara Toles =

American environmental activist

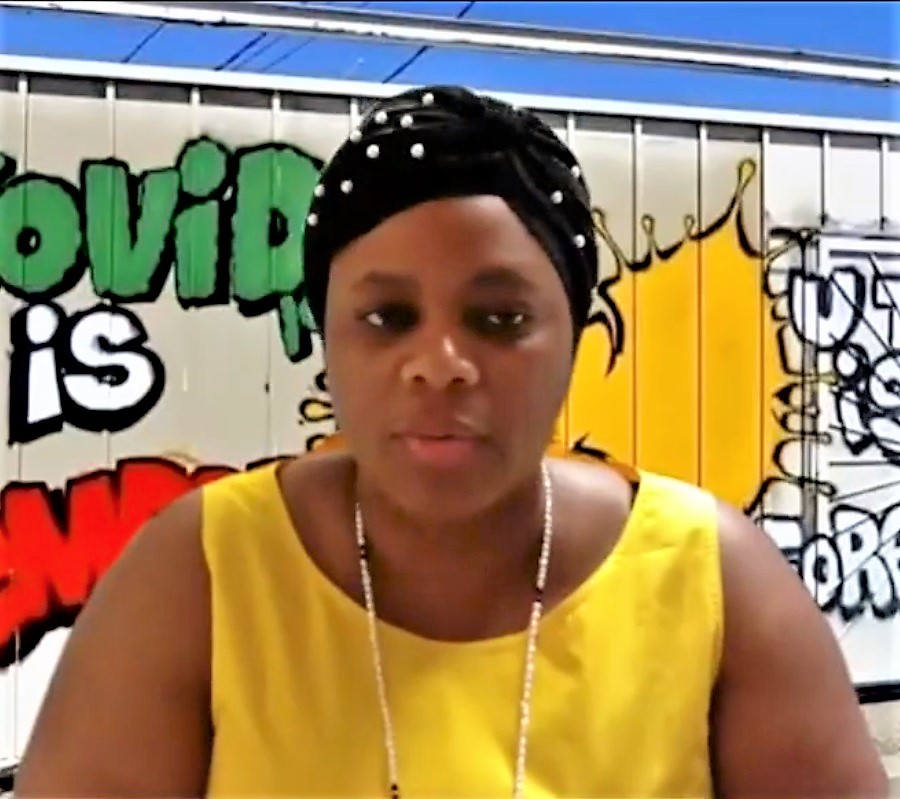
- Toles O'Laughlin in 2020
- Born: Brooklyn, New York, U.S.
- Education: Vermont Law School; City University of New York
- Employer: Environmental Grantmakers Association
- Website: https://www.tolesolaughlin.com

Tamara Toles O'Laughlin is an environmentalist, climate strategist, founder, CEO and president of the Environmental Grantmakers Association (EGA).

== Early life and education ==
Toles is from Brooklyn, New York. She is an environmental activist that focuses on people, the planet and its resources.

Toles was an undergraduate student at the City University of New York, where she majored in political science. She earned a Juris Doctor from Vermont Law School and a master's degree in Environmental Law and Policy.

== Career ==
As a City College student, she interned at the Advisory Council on Historic Preservation and the Environmental Protection Agency. During graduate school at Vermont Law School she interned at the Southern District of NY under Judge Richard M. Berman and Center on Race, Poverty and Environment, and fulfilled a summer law fellowship at the Natural Resources Defense Council.

After graduate school, Toles O’Laughlin worked for the Maryland Energy Administration and District Department of Energy and Environment in Washington, DC. As well, she served as the Senior Law Clerk to the Honorable Douglas A. Brady, and the Senior Sitting Judge Julio A. Brady at the Superior Court of the US Virgin Islands on St. Croix.

In 2014, Toles was appointed to the executive board of EcoWomen. During her tenure, she held several positions, including producer and host of the organization's signature salon and monthly educational forum, Eco Hour. She closed her term as the board chair during the final two years.

She also served on the board of the Maryland Climate Coalition.

In February 2017, Toles was appointed as executive director of the Maryland Environmental Health Network, where she worked to eliminate environmental threats to human health. She created the Baltimore City Climate Resolution, which upholds the Paris Agreement and calls for 100% renewable energy use in Baltimore by 2050. It encourages the development of wind technology and disincentivizes incineration. The resolution was passed in June 2017. In 2018, she was awarded the Vermont Law School Social Justice Scholars Alumni Award. She also co-founded the Healthy Green Maryland Amendment Initiative to define healthy communities and provide multi-generational protections to defend against disproportionate climate impacts in the Maryland constitution.

In the year of 2019, Toles O’Laughlin joined 350.org as its North America Director, making her the first African-American woman to hold this position in an environment or climate organization.

In 2021, Toles O’Laughlin joined the EGA as its CEO and President. That same year Toles O’Laughlin launched Climate Critical, a global support intervention for workers in environment and climate.

As well, Toles O’Laughlin has written for Rolling Stone, The Nation, Yes! magazine and Grist. She is a contributor to Politico‘s Long Game Forum on issues of environment, equity, energy access and climate justice.
