= Shirley Carew Titus =

Shirley Carew Titus (April 28, 1892 – March 21, 1967) was a nurse educator at the University of Michigan (MA, 1930) and Vanderbilt University School of Nursing. Titus was the executive director of the California Nurses' Association from 1942 until 1956. She successfully advocated for and achieved the first collective bargaining for nurses. In 1982, Titus was inducted into the American Nurses Association Hall of Fame. She died on March 21,1967.
