= Shroyer =

Shroyer is a surname of German origin which is the Pennsylvania German form of the original German Schreyer or Schreier and more seldom Schraier or Schrayer. Notable people with the surname include:

- Don Shroyer (1925–2013), American college football player and coach
- Ken Shroyer (1898–1974), American football coach
- Owen Shroyer (born 1989), American political activist and commentator
- Sonny Shroyer (born 1935), American actor

== See also ==
- Schreyer
- Scheier
- Shrayer
