= Shirley Baker (architect) =

American architect

- Born: April 22, 1895; Caldwell County, Texas, United States
- Died: November 12, 1942 (aged 47); Corpus Christi, Texas, United States
- Occupation: Architect

Shirley Baker (April 22, 1895 – November 12, 1942) was an American architect. His work was part of the architecture event in the art competition at the 1932 Summer Olympics.
