= Shirley Scheier =

American painter and printmaker

Shirley Scheier is an American painter and printmaker. She studied at the University of Kansas and the University of Wisconsin–Madison. She was the recipient of a MacDowell fellowship in 1994. She taught at the University of Washington from 1986 to 2016.

Examples of her work are included in the collections of the Seattle Art Museum, the Portland Art Museum the Tacoma Art Museum and the Nelson-Atkins Museum of Art.
