= South Royalton station =

Historic building in Royalton, Vermont

- South Royalton Railroad Station
- U.S. Historic district – Contributing property
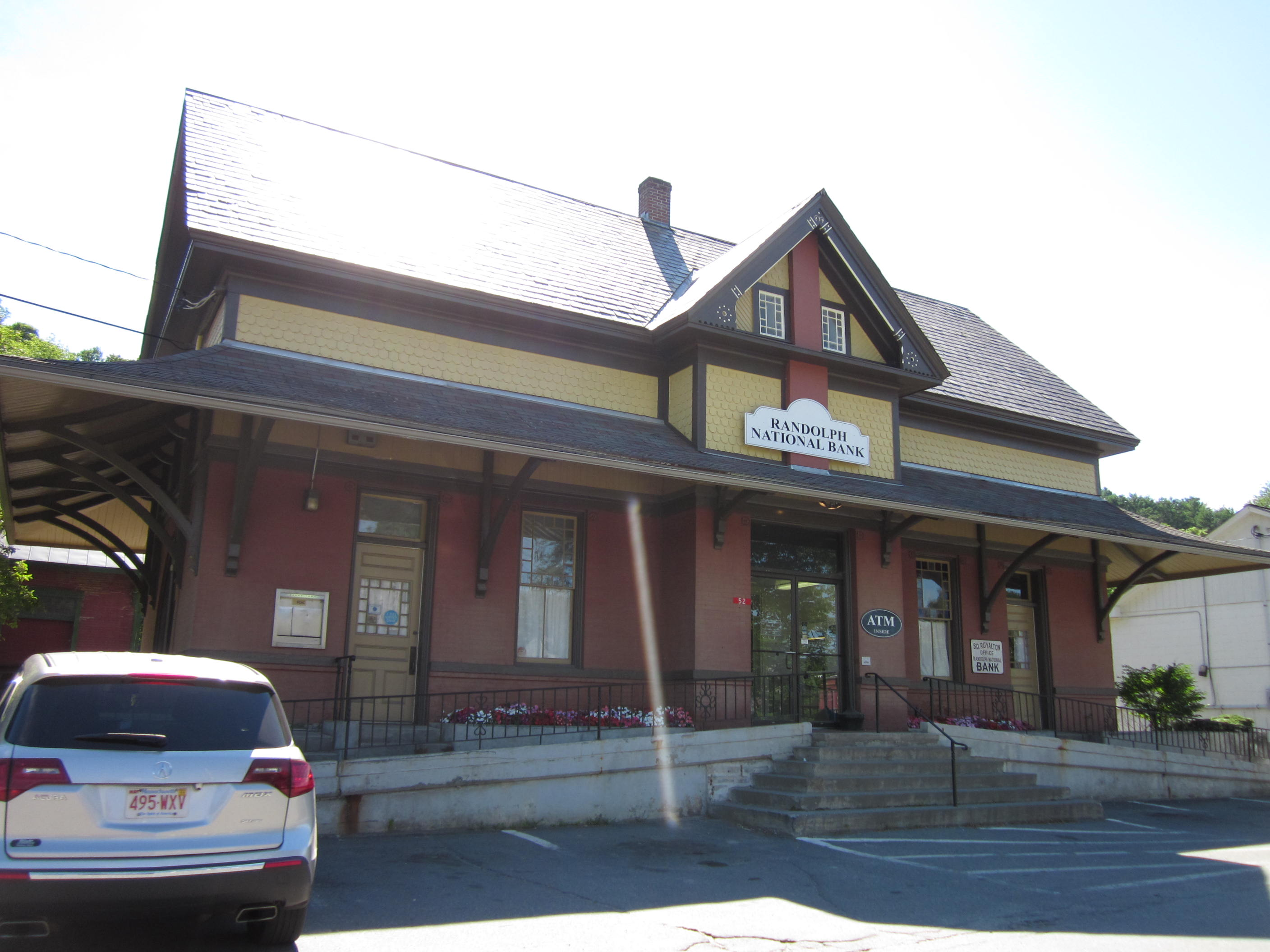
- As a Randolph National Bank branch, 2011
- Location: 52 Railroad St., South Royalton, Vermont
- Coordinates: 43.819452°N 72.521673°W
- Built: 1886
- Architect: George H. Guernsey
- Architectural style: Queen Anne
- Part of: South Royalton Historic District (ID76000200)
- Added to NRHP: September 3, 1976

The South Royalton Railroad Station is a former train station in the community of South Royalton, Vermont. The 1886 station building still stands, used as a local bank branch of Bar Harbor Bank & Trust. It is a contributing property to the South Royalton Historic District, on the National Register of Historic Places.

== Attributes ==
The building has a first floor made of brick with horseshoe-shaped colored windows at either end and flared wraparound roofing. Above this is a half-story with overlapping patterned wood shingles, topped with a large slate roof with gables. The gables are decorated with Eastlake bargeboards.

== History ==
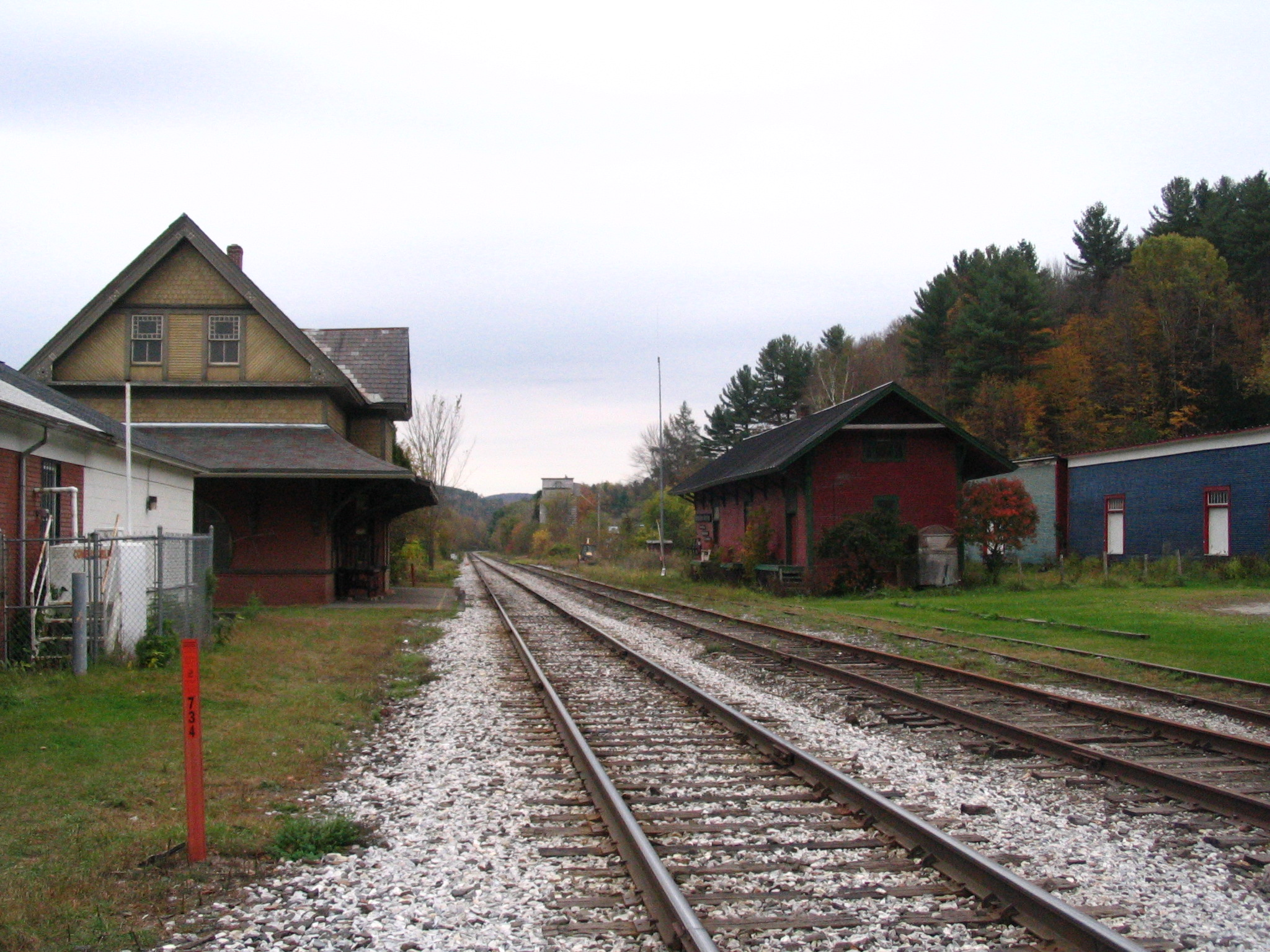
The 1886 station (left) and older depot (right)

The site was first developed in 1849–50, during the construction of the Vermont Central Railroad. Local mill owner Daniel Tarbell decided to construct a freight and passenger depot at the site, instead of at what was then the center of town. The resulting railway village was mostly Greek Revival in style. A fire in 1886 destroyed much of the village, although the old station remained. The village park was expanded, new stores were built, and the new station building was completed, with the former building becoming a freight station.

The building was constructed in 1886, designed by George H. Guernsey, who designed the nearby Debevoise Hall at the Vermont Law School and other town buildings following a large fire that year. The building later became a branch of the Randolph National Bank, which was purchased by Lake Sunapee Bank in 2016. In 2017, Bar Harbor Bank & Trust purchased Sunapee, and so the bank is owned and operated by Bar Harbor.

== See also ==
- National Register of Historic Places listings in Windsor County, Vermont

| Preceding station | Central Vermont Railway | Following station |
|---|---|---|
| Sharon toward New London | Main Line | Royalton toward St. Johns |
