= Evelyn M. Lovejoy =

- Born: Evelyn Mary Wood; 11 June 1847; Pomfret, Vermont
- Died: 4 June 1928 (aged 80); Royalton, Vermont
- Education: University of Chicago (BA)
- Occupations: Educator, Writer
- Known for: Compiling town history, arguments for the building of the Joseph Smith Birthplace Memorial
- Notable work: History of Royalton, Vermont, with Family Genealogies, 1769-1911

Evelyn M. Lovejoy (June 11, 1847 – 4 June 1928) was an American educator, writer, and genealogist. Her research included Joseph Smith's family history and she was involved in local debates over whether to approve the building of the Joseph Smith Birthplace Memorial. She also established the South Royalton Library.

== Biography ==
Evelyn Mary Wood was born in Pomfret, Vermont on June 11, 1847 to Jacob Wood and Dorothy McIntire. She was the youngest of six siblings. She published pieces of writing in local newspapers and lady's journals such as Arthur's Lady's Home Magazine and The Household: A Monthly Journal Devoted to the Interests of the American Housewife, a forerunner to the Ladies' Home Journal. At this time, Wood wrote under the pseudonym “Gypsey Traine." She married Daniel W. Lovejoy in September 1874.

After the unfortunate death of both her infant son in 1879 and her husband in 1880, Lovejoy worked as the principal and superintendent of the Royalton Academy.

In 1886, she moved to the Midwest to work as a schoolteacher in the newly created Vermont City, Dakota Territory (now Loyalton, South Dakota), part of the Dakota Boom. By the time the colony had dwindled in 1890, Lovejoy moved to attend the Wellesley College of the newly formed University of Chicago, where she graduated with an AB degree in 1897. She then taught at the St. Cloud Normal School in Minnesota, where she wrote her novel, Dandelion, Or Out of the Shadows. Published in 1899, this sentimental novel set primarily in Vermont tells the story of a young woman, Adnah Craik, who first seeks to find her parents and then to prove that she is not illegitimate. Both Lovejoy and Adnah share careers as school teachers, both go on to get higher education later in life, and one of the characters experiences the death of a husband. Lovejoy later taught high school grammar and literature in Helena, Montana.

In 1906, at the request of the town of South Royalton, Lovejoy moved back to Vermont to work on her most extensive project, the thousand-page History of Royalton, Vermont, with Family Genealogies, 1769-1911 in two volumes, completed in 1911. This massive undertaking, carried out with the help of the local women’s society and donations, collected local family genealogies and traced extended family members across the country, including the history of Joseph Smith (born nearby in Sharon). While she worked on this project, she also again worked at the Royalton Academy. She also created the South Royalton Library and was involved in the town’s debates regarding the building of the Joseph Smith Birthplace Memorial.

== Works ==
- “Our Household Pet,” Arthur’s Lady’s Home Magazine, Vol. XXXIV, p.21 (July 1869). Philadelphia.
- “Something to Do,” The Household: A Monthly Journal Devoted to the Interests of the American Housewife, Vol. 7, No. 2, p. 43 (February, 1874). Brattleboro, VT.
- “Making the Best of It,” The Household: A Monthly Journal Devoted to the Interests of the American Housewife, Vol. 7, No. 12, p. 279-280 (December, 1874). Brattleboro, VT.
- “Why Do We Lie?” The Household: A Monthly Journal Devoted to the Interests of the American Housewife, Vol. 8, No. 11, p. 259 (November, 1875). Brattleboro, VT.
- “A School-Girl’s View of Examination Day,” Journal of Education, Vol. XXXV (June 23, 1892). Chicago.
- Dandelion; Or, Out of the Shadows. Chicago: F. Tennyson Neely, 1899.
- History of Royalton, Vermont, with Family Genealogies, 1769-1911. 2 Vols. Burlington, VT: Free Press Printing Company, 1911.
