= Mayor of Montpelier, Vermont =

Political office in the United States

Montpelier, Vermont was first chartered as a town on August 14, 1781, chosen as the state capital in 1805, and subsequently incorporated as a city in 1894. Under the city charter, the government of the city consists of a mayor, city manager, and city council, in what is called a Mayor–council–manager government. The mayor is elected to a two-year term by residents of Montpelier and presides over city council meetings. The city council consists of the mayor and six elected city counselors - two from each of Montpelier's three voting districts and serve two-year terms. The city manager is appointed by and serves at the pleasure of the city council.

== Current mayor ==
Since March 2026, Marc Gwinn has served as the mayor of Montpelier, Vermont.

=== Former mayors ===
Individuals who have served as mayor since Montpelier's incorporation as a city and their years of election include:

- 1895 – George W. Wing
- 1896 – George O. Stratton
- 1897 – George H. Guernsey
- 1898, 1899 – John H. Senter
- 1900, 1901 – Joseph B. Brown
- 1902 – James M. Boutwell
- 1903, 1904, 1905 – Frank M. Corry
- 1906, 1907 – James S. Haley
- 1908, 1909, 1910 – Frank R. Dawley
- 1911 – Smith S. Ballard
- 1912, 1913 – James B. Estee
- 1914, 1915, 1916 – James M. Boutwell
- 1917, 1918 – Frank W. Mitchell
- 1919, 1920 – Harry C. Shurtleff
- 1921 – George L. Blanchard
- 1922 – Dean K. Lillie
- 1924, 1925 – George L. Edson
- 1926, 1927, 1928, 1929 – Edward Deavitt
- 1930, 1931, 1932 – Riley C. Bowers
- 1933 – William L. McKee
- 1934 – Perry H. Merrill
- 1935, James S. Ewing
- 1936, 1937 – William H. Dyer
- 1938, 1939 – Birney L. Hall
- 1939, 1940, 1941, 1942, 1943, 1944 – William F. Corry
- 1945, 1946 – Harry R. Sheridan
- 1947, 1948 – Daughly Gould
- 1949, 1950, 1951, 1952, 1953, 1954, 1955 – Anson F. Barber
- 1956, 1957, 1958 – Edward F. Knapp
- 1959, 1960, 1961, 1962 – Elbert C. Colburn
- 1963, 1964, 1965, 1966 – Manuel Canas Jr. (Note: Canas was reelected in March 1966, but resigned in May.)
- 1966, 1968, 1970 – Willard R. Strong (Note: Strong was elected in May 1966 to complete Canas' term.) (Note: Mayors served one year terms that began each March. Since 1968, mayors have served a two-year term that began in May (now March) of each even-numbered year.)
- 1972, 1974 – Richard W. Curtis
- 1976 – Frederic H. Bertrand
- 1978, 1980 – Charles B. Nichols
- 1982, 1984 – Frank D. Romano
- 1986 – Sally Rice
- 1988 – Arthur J. Goss
- 1990, 1992, 1994 – Ann E. Cummings
- 1996, 1998, 2000, 2002 – Charles D. Karparis
- 2004, 2006, 2008, 2010 – Mary S. Hooper
- 2012, 2014, 2016 – John H. Hollar
- 2018, 2020, 2022 – Anne Watson
- 2023, 2024 – Jack McCullough
- 2026 – Marc Gwinn
