= Chelsea Street Bridge =

Chelsea Street Bridge may refer to:

- Chelsea Street Bridge (Boston)
- Chelsea Street Bridge (Royalton, Vermont)
