= St. Thomas Church (Underhill, Vermont) =

Coordinates: 44.506968°N 72.900899°W

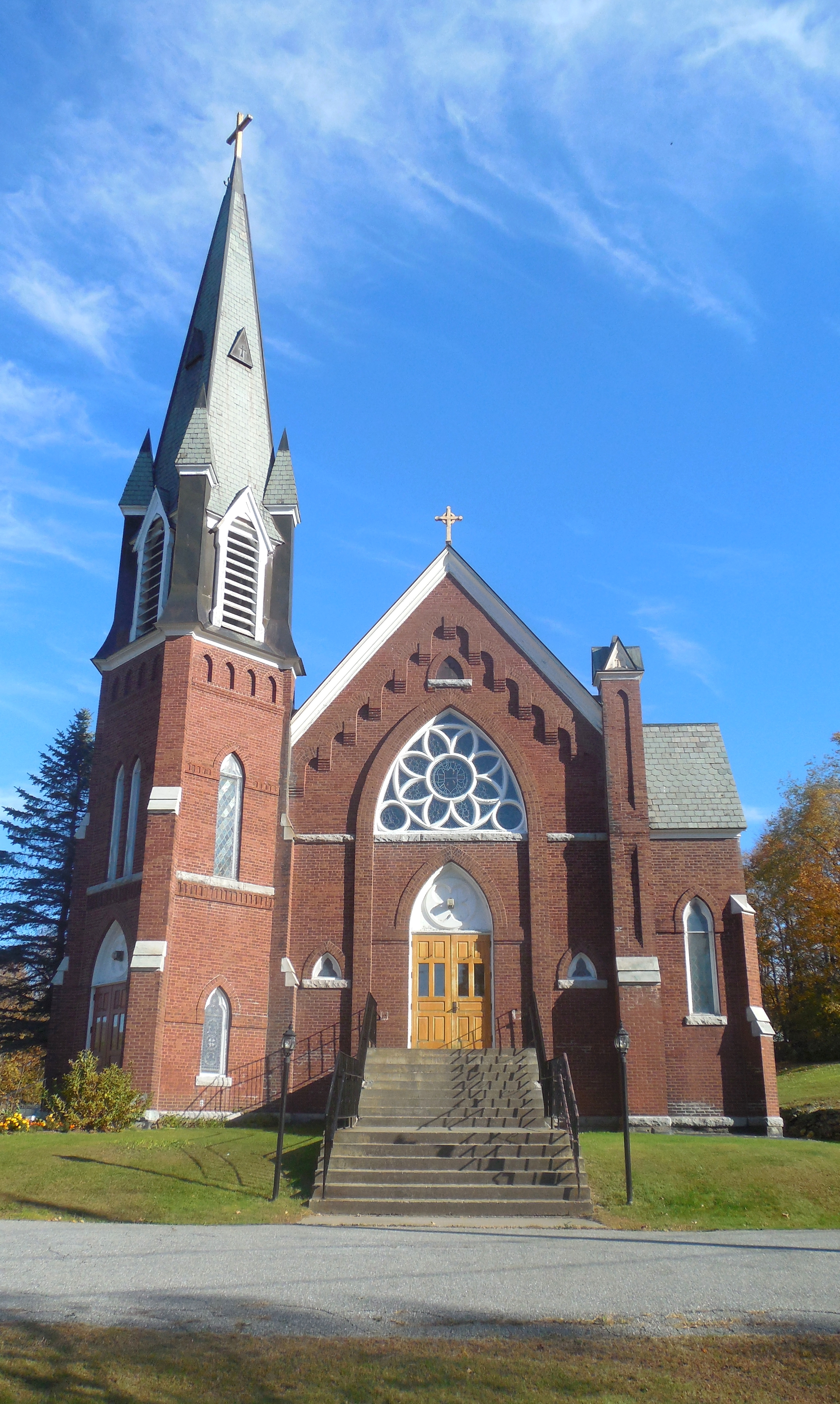
- St. Thomas Church
- Location: 6 Green St., Underhill Center, Vermont
- Country: United States
- Denomination: Roman Catholic
- Website: www.stthomasvt.com

History
- Status: Church
- Founded: 1872
- Dedication: Saint Thomas
- Dedicated: Cornerstone laid 12 Aug 1891

Architecture
- Architect: George H. Guernsey
- Style: Gothic Revival architecture
- Groundbreaking: April 1891; Construction began 1 May 1891
- Completed: December 1892
- Construction cost: $21,399

Specifications
- Capacity: 400
- Length: 124 ft (38 m)
- Width: 41 ft (12 m)
- Materials: Red Brick trimmed with Bennington limestone

Administration
- Diocese: Diocese of Burlington

St. Thomas Church is a Roman Catholic church in the Town of Underhill, Vermont in the United States, located in the unincorporated village of Underhill Center.

The church was built from 1891 to 1892 after its predecessor had burned down on 19 December 1890. The cornerstone for the current St. Thomas Church building was laid on 12 August 1891 at an event that had an estimated 1,000 attendees. Although the construction period spanned from 1 May 1891 until December 1892, the first Mass was nevertheless held in the basement of the church on Christmas Day in 1891. The first child was baptized there on New Year's Day in 1892. The first Mass was held within the church proper on Christmas Day 1892. The first marriage was held in the church on 9 January 1893.

== The Old Wooden Church ==
The previous wooden church had been constructed with hired and voluntary labor during 1854–55 to serve a majority populace of 63 Irish immigrant farming and logging families. In July 1854, the Catholics of Underhill Center had raised $1,250 to build it, and Bishop Louis de Goesbriand (1816–1899) purchased a small lot and house (which was later moved) in Underhill Center for $300 from a Martin Flannery for this purpose. On 4 June 1855 the church had been raised up. Further work continued over the course of the next year. In 1856, more land was added to the church property (which today is the location of the crossroad in front of the church). The building was considered by the bishop to be a "good frame building", measuring 50 ft (15 m) x 32 ft (9.8 m) with 16 ft (4.9 m) between its floors, and also had a gallery. On 14 December 1856, St. Thomas Church was blessed by the bishop. Sometime between 1881 and 1883, the pastor Father Magloire Pigeon (invoking the tradition of pew renting) spent about $2,000 to expand the church by 35 ft (11 m) in length x 25 ft (7.6 m) in width. The improvements provided the church with a 18 ft (5.5 m) x 25 ft (7.6 m) chancel, a 12 ft (3.7 m) x 25 ft (7.6 m) vestry, and a 8 ft (2.4 m) x 30 ft (9.1 m) front vestibule.

By October 1890, the pastor Father James D. Shannon (1861–1936) had thoroughly renovated the church and made a number improvements, including; the excavation of a cellar underneath, the addition of a west wing, as well as heating apparatus, sanitary plumbing, and sewage facilities. An unexplained fire burned the church to the ground in December of that year. However, the pastor had also insured the church building for $2,500.

== Construction of the New Church ==
Under the leadership of Father Shannon, services were temporarily moved to the then unused Green Mountain Academy, and plans for a new church were implemented with a "generous response" from parishioners. Records claim a comment from the pastor stating; "as usual, the poorer portion of the congregation were the more generous."

The location for the new building on the church's property required the removal of thousands of yards of earth from a bank toward the rear of the site, using a pick and shovel technique, and carting away soil by wagon; a task that was not fully completed until 1898.

The celebratory laying of the cornerstone took place on 12 August 1891. Coordinated train and (horse-drawn) carriage transportation for the event was arranged for attendees from Barre, Montpelier, and Burlington. A Solemn High Mass was celebrated with Bishop de Goesbriand in attendance with Father W.J. O'Sullivan of Montpelier serving as celebrant. The bishop laid the cornerstone at the event's conclusion.

The church was built with a spire reaching 100 ft (30.48 m) "from top of water-table", and had a capacity to seat some 400 worshipers. The building was originally equipped with a fully finished basement with a dining hall, kitchen, a stage, office, cloak room, and smoking rooms.

On 25 August 1895, a 2,900 lb (1,300 kg) bell was installed in the church's bell tower with the inscription "A Gift from St. Thomas Congregation – August 1895 – Christened St. James – McShane Foundry – Baltimore, Md. – 1895".

In 1942, the pastor (Father Joseph Dussault) refurbished the Sacristy altar and had a steel-reinforced cement foundation constructed underneath that area of the building. In 1943, cement steps were installed at the main entrance of the church.

== Architecture ==
The current church was designed by George H. Guernsey (1839–1900), a self-taught architect who had served for a term as mayor of Montpelier, Vermont in 1897, and had designed a number of prominent buildings in Vermont and New Hampshire, including a number of catholic churches, such as; St. Augustine Church (Montpelier, VT), Immaculate Heart of Mary Church (Rutland, VT), Notre Dame de Victories Catholic Church (St. Johnsbury, VT), and the Sacred Heart Saint Francis de Sales Roman Catholic Church (Bennington, VT); as well as churches for other denominations, including; the Methodist Episcopal Church (Barton, VT) and the United Baptist Church of Lakeport (Laconia, NH). Of his architectural style, it has been stated that Guernsey employed dramatic corner towers and asymmetrical massings in his designs, often combining "square-spired" and "conically topped round towers".

A historical report by the Vermont Division for Historic Preservation considers the architectural style of the church to be Victorian Gothic and emphasizes its variety of gothic arches and wall buttresses that were constructed in "a highly eclectic style".

The report further illustrates the church's architectural features;

"Raised granite foundation and water table; basement level windows have segmental arches linked by a projecting brick lintel course. Walls have buttresses with bevelled stone shoulder blocks. Roof has bands of imbricated slates, molded cornice, gold crosses at gable peaks. Front gable is enriched by Gothic arched corbelling. Inside of front gable peak is a large floral motif tracery window set inside a lancet arch that also surrounds the front door. Panelled double doors and Gothic-arched transom with quatrefoil panel. Entrance is flanked by Gothic-arched parlor windows with trefoil lights. Corner tower is angled and buttressed, has narrow lancet windows, corbelled cornice, buttressed spire with arched louvers; tower entrance has panelled doors, Gothic-arched transom with trefoil panel. Buttressed south elevation gable projection has elaborate corbelled chimney. Side elevations have lancet windows; center bays are large wall dormers with floral motif tracery windows; rear ell has door hood with elaborate Gothic cut-out brackets.."

— Vermont Division for Historic Preservation – Historic Sites & Structures Survey, 1980

== Gallery ==
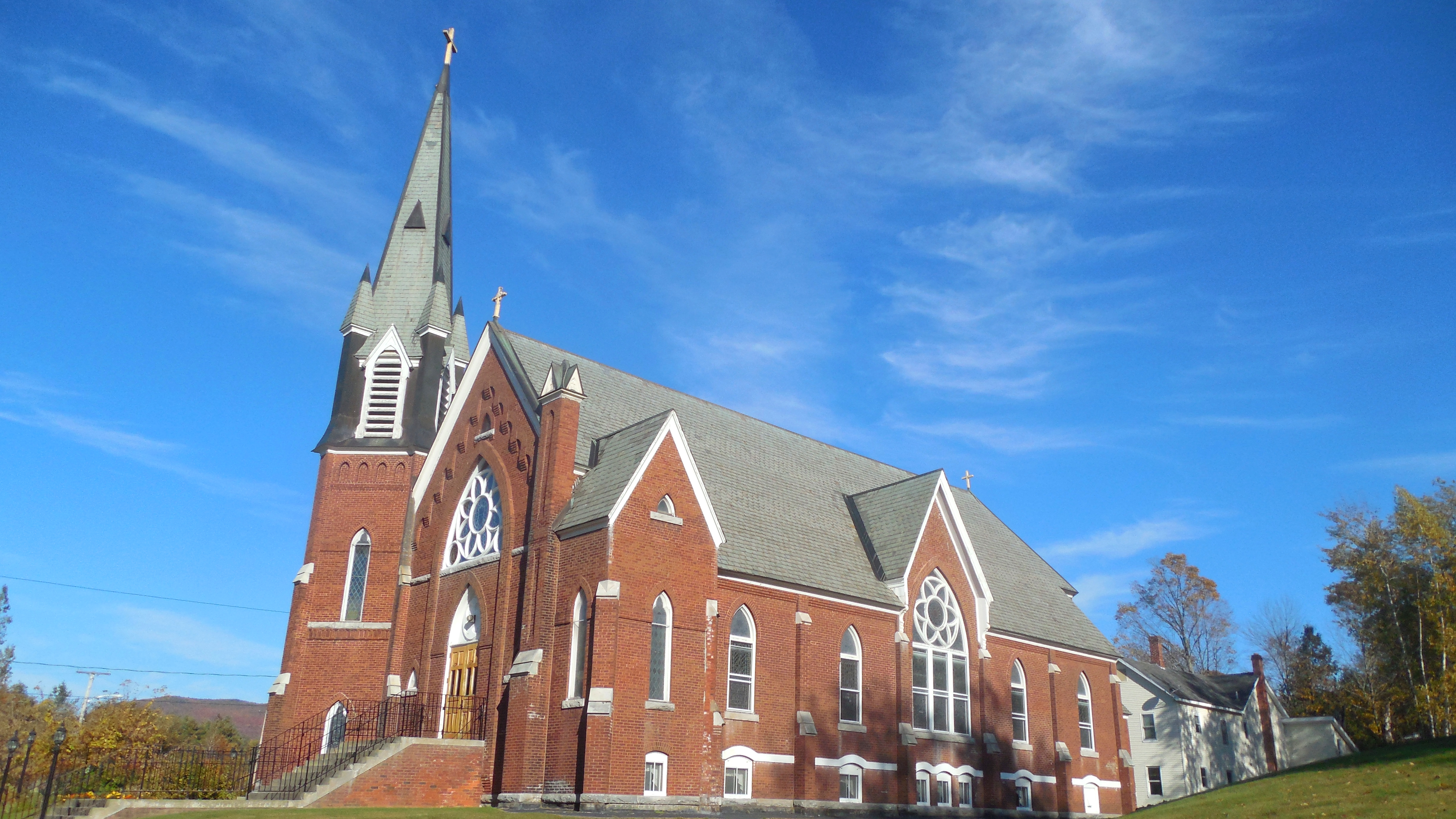
Southern side of St. Thomas Church

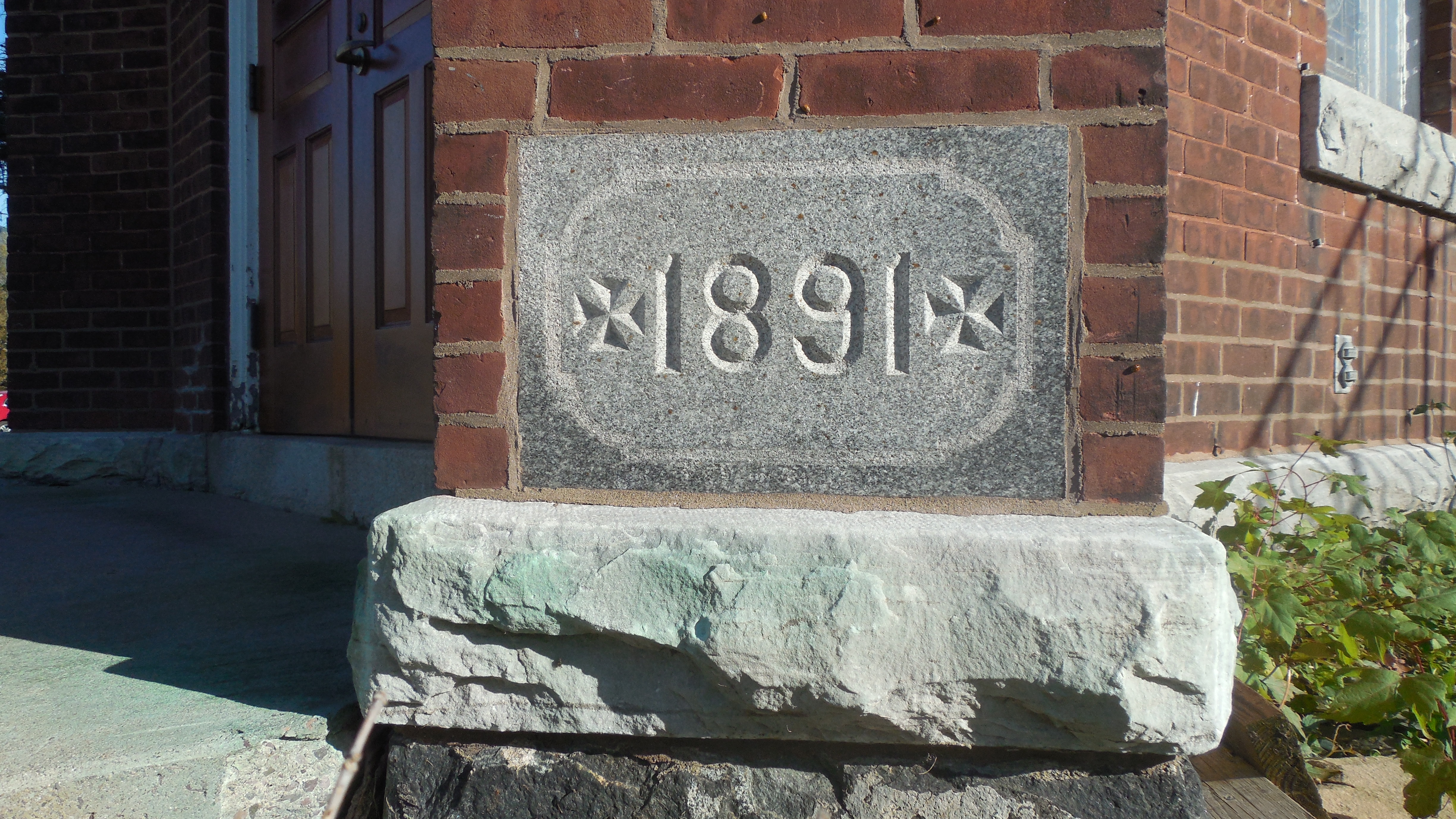
Cornerstone of St. Thomas Church

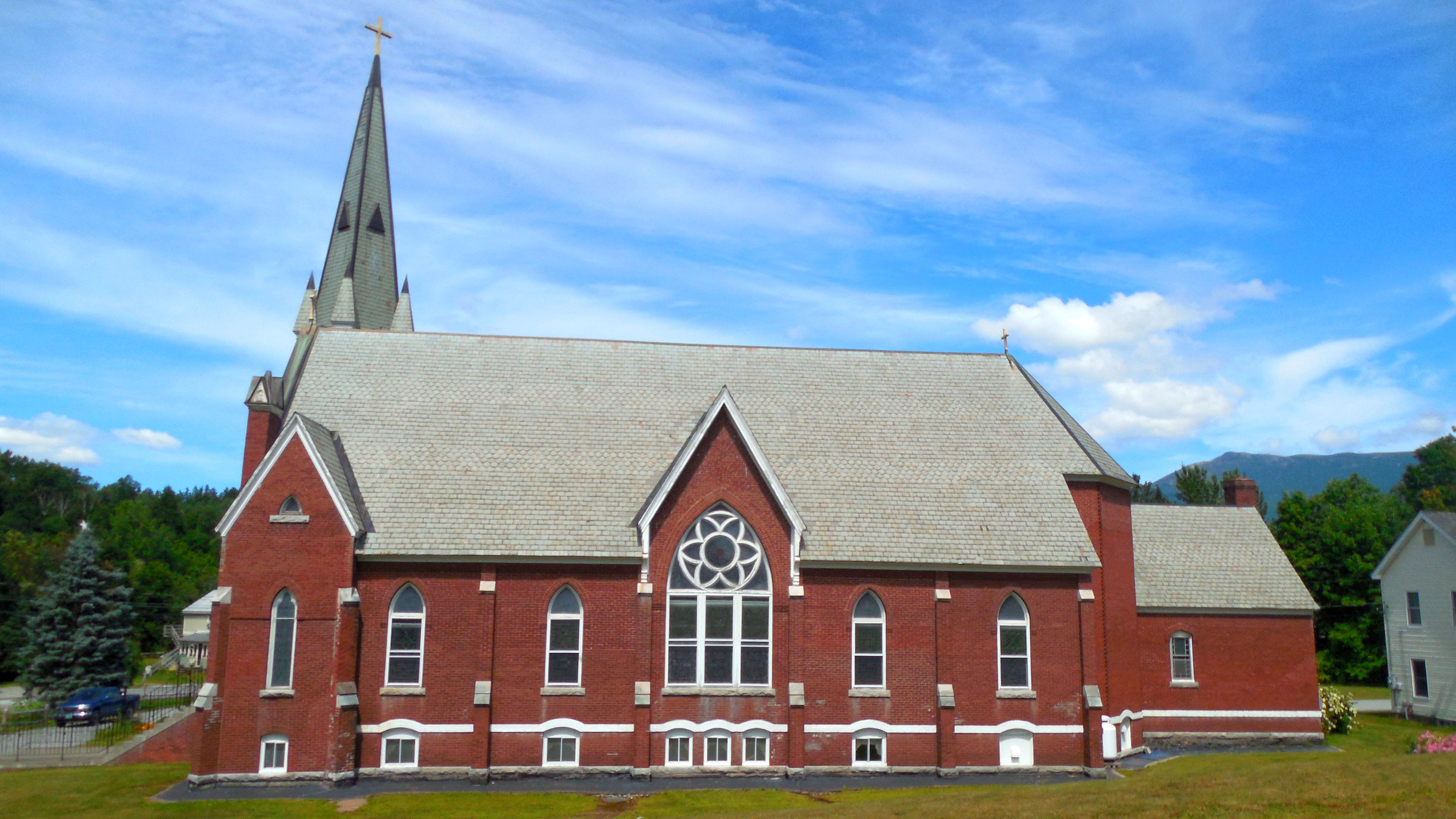
St. Thomas Church with Mount Mansfield in the background
