= Royalton Memorial Library =

Historic building in Royalton, Vermont

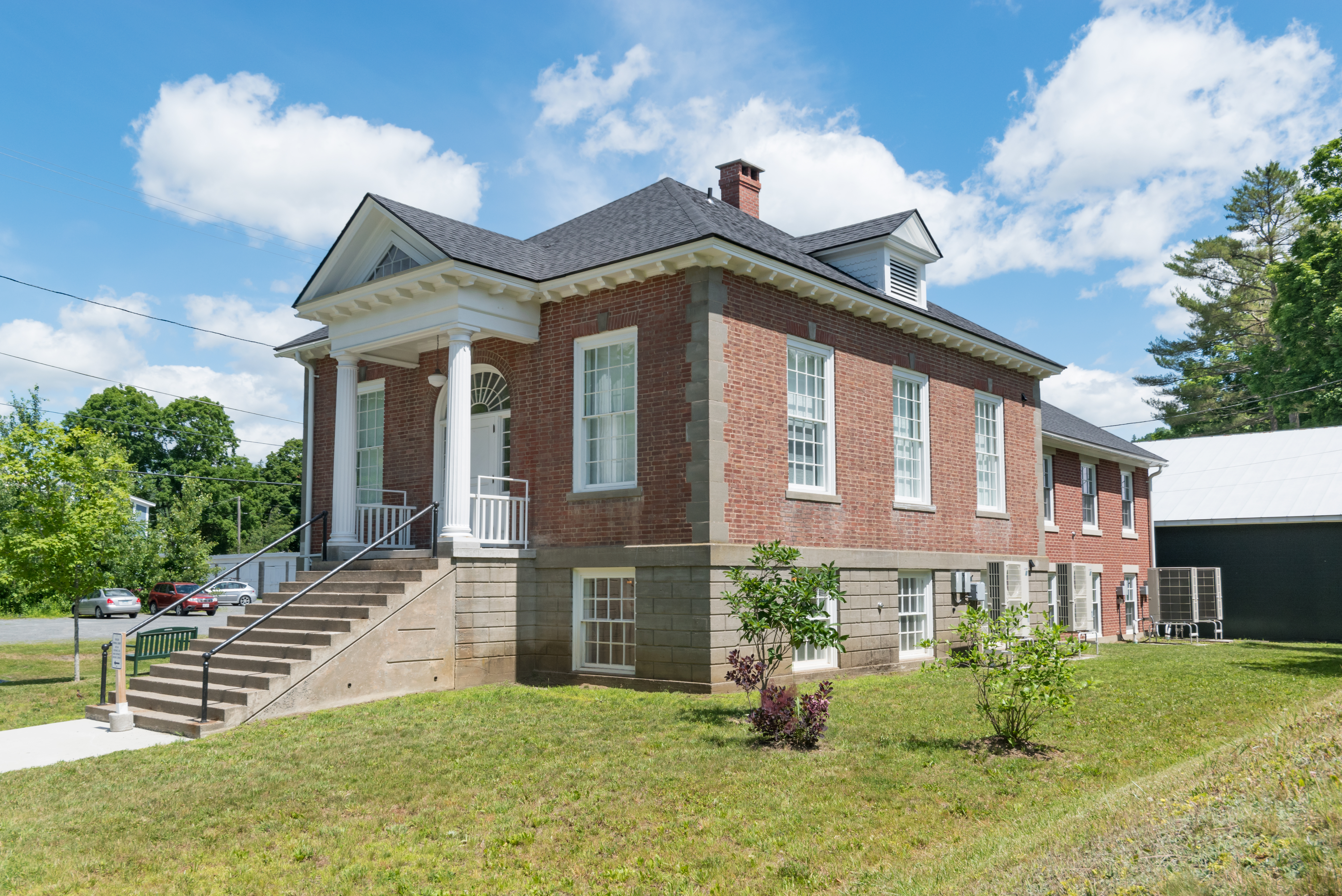
- 43.818301°N 72.519586°W
- Location: 57 Safford St., South Royalton, Vermont
- Type: Incorporated Public Library Library
- Established: 1917

Other information
- Director: Maegan Winters, Assistant Pam Levasseur
- Website: www.royaltonlibrary.org

History
- Built: 1919–24

Site notes
- Architect: Louis Sheldon Newton
- Architectural style: Colonial Revival

U.S. National Register of Historic Places
- Designated: September 3, 1976
- Part of: South Royalton Historic District
- Reference no.: #76000200

The Royalton Memorial Library is a public library in South Royalton, Vermont. The library organization was founded in 1917; its building was built from 1919 to 1924 and was expanded in 2020.

== Design ==
The building is located at the corner of Alexander Place and Safford Street, named for resident Truman Henry Safford.

The building was designed for the Royalton Memorial Library Association in the Colonial Revival style by Louis Sheldon Newton, a locally-born architect. It was originally a 1.5-story brick structure, with a tall cement basement. The exterior is decorated with cement quoins, and the roof is hipped, with three gabled dormers, on the northwest, northeast, and southeast sides. The southwest elevation has a pedimented gabled entrance portico. The doorway includes a door flanked by sidelights, all beneath a semi-elliptical arched fan light.

The building's first floor has a welcoming feel to it, with a brick fireplace, armchairs, and a classically detailed archway into another space, formerly housing the children's area, and prior to that, the town historical society. The ground floor formerly held town offices, and became derelict and unusable, only housing surplus books, until the library's 2019 renovation.

== History ==
The Royalton Memorial Library Association was founded in 1917, led by Evelyn Lovejoy. She became the first woman elected to public office in the town of Royalton in 1912, when she was elected to the board of trustees of the now-defunct Royalton Free Public Library, in the village of Royalton.

The current-day library broke ground in 1919, with the exterior nearly completed by 1921, when funds ran out. Lovejoy, a teacher at Royalton Academy, canvassed individuals and businesses for pledges for the building's construction, and donated the proceeds from her book, The History of Royalton, to the library construction fund.

In 1976, the library building was added to the National Register of Historic Places, as a contributing part of the new South Royalton Historic District.

In 2016, the library hosted a small exhibit about Louis Sheldon Nelson, architect of the building and other local landmarks, including the present-day look of the Old Constitution House.

In 2017, the Royalton Memorial Library Association celebrated its 100th anniversary on the South Royalton Green. The event included a performance by the South Royalton Town Band as well as free cake. Also in 2017, the library began to be overwhelmed by book donations, and the Vermont Occupational Safety and Health Administration necessitated a renovation to make the building handicap-accessible, or it would force the building's closure.

From April 2019 to February 2020, a two-story addition to the library was constructed. Architect Jay White was commissioned, chosen for his desire to preserve historic details. The project was approved in 2017 and cost $737,500, and created a 1,500 sq ft (140 m^{2}) space for a children's room, maker space, meeting room, kitchenette, staff office, two bathrooms, an elevator, and a new entrance at ground-level, giving it ADA accessibility. The reopening was held on February 15, 2020. The expanded library was open for shortly over a month when the COVID-19 pandemic forced another temporary closure. The Ensign Peak Foundation donated to the renovation, in an agreement for the library to install a plaque in the library's history room in memorial of Joseph Smith, who was born about four miles away.

== See also ==
- National Register of Historic Places listings in Windsor County, Vermont
