= South Royalton Historic District =

Historic district in Vermont, United States

- U.S. National Register of Historic Places
- U.S. Historic district
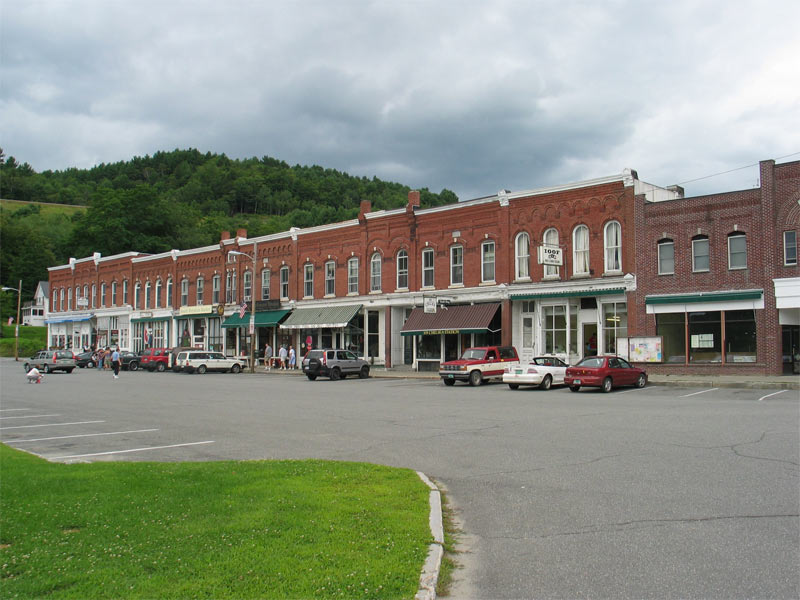
- Interactive map of South Royalton Historic District
- Location: Centered on Chelsea and Windsor Sts., Royalton, Vermont
- Coordinates: 43°49′14″N 72°31′17″W
- Area: 96 acres (39 ha)
- Built: 1848
- Architectural style: Greek Revival, Queen Anne, Italianate Revival
- NRHP reference No.: 76000200
- Added to NRHP: September 3, 1976

The South Royalton Historic District encompasses the central portion of the village of South Royalton, Vermont. Now the town of Royalton's principal commercial center, it developed in the second half of the 19th century around the depot of the Vermont Central Railroad. The district includes fine examples of Greek Revival and Victorian architecture alongside with various farms by the outskirts, and is home to the Vermont Law School. It was listed on the National Register of Historic Places in 1976.

== Description and history ==
The village of South Royalton was farmland prior to the arrival of the Vermont Central Railroad in 1848. Daniel Tarbell, a mill owner from Tunbridge, recognized the location as an ideal site for a freight depot, purchased land from the local farmers, and began commercial and residential development. By 1855, the village had 28 buildings, generally in the Greek Revival style, some of which survive today. Much of the village center's character, however, is derived from fires which swept through the area with some regularity. A particularly devastating fire in 1886 destroyed all of its commercial buildings, after which the Victorian block of brick shops lining the northwest side of Chelsea Street was built.

The district extends along Chelsea and Windsor Streets for about two blocks from their junction, with a few properties on Railroad, Safford, and New Streets. To the west of the main intersection, the district is ended after a single block by the presence of the railroad tracks. At the northeastern end of Chelsea Street it also included a now-replaced truss bridge across the White River. Its dominant features include the campus of the Vermont Law School on Chelsea Street, the brick Italianate line of shops between Windsor Street and the railroad tracks, and the South Royalton Green at the southwest junction of Windsor and Chelsea. At the southwestern corner of the park stands the South Royalton House, built as an inn serving railroad passengers by Daniel Tarbell in 1850.

=== Notable elements ===
- Debevoise Hall
- Royalton Memorial Library
- Chelsea Street Bridge
- South Royalton Green
- South Royalton Railroad Station

== See also ==
- National Register of Historic Places listings in Windsor County, Vermont
