= South Royalton Green =

Park in South Royalton, VT

- South Royalton Park
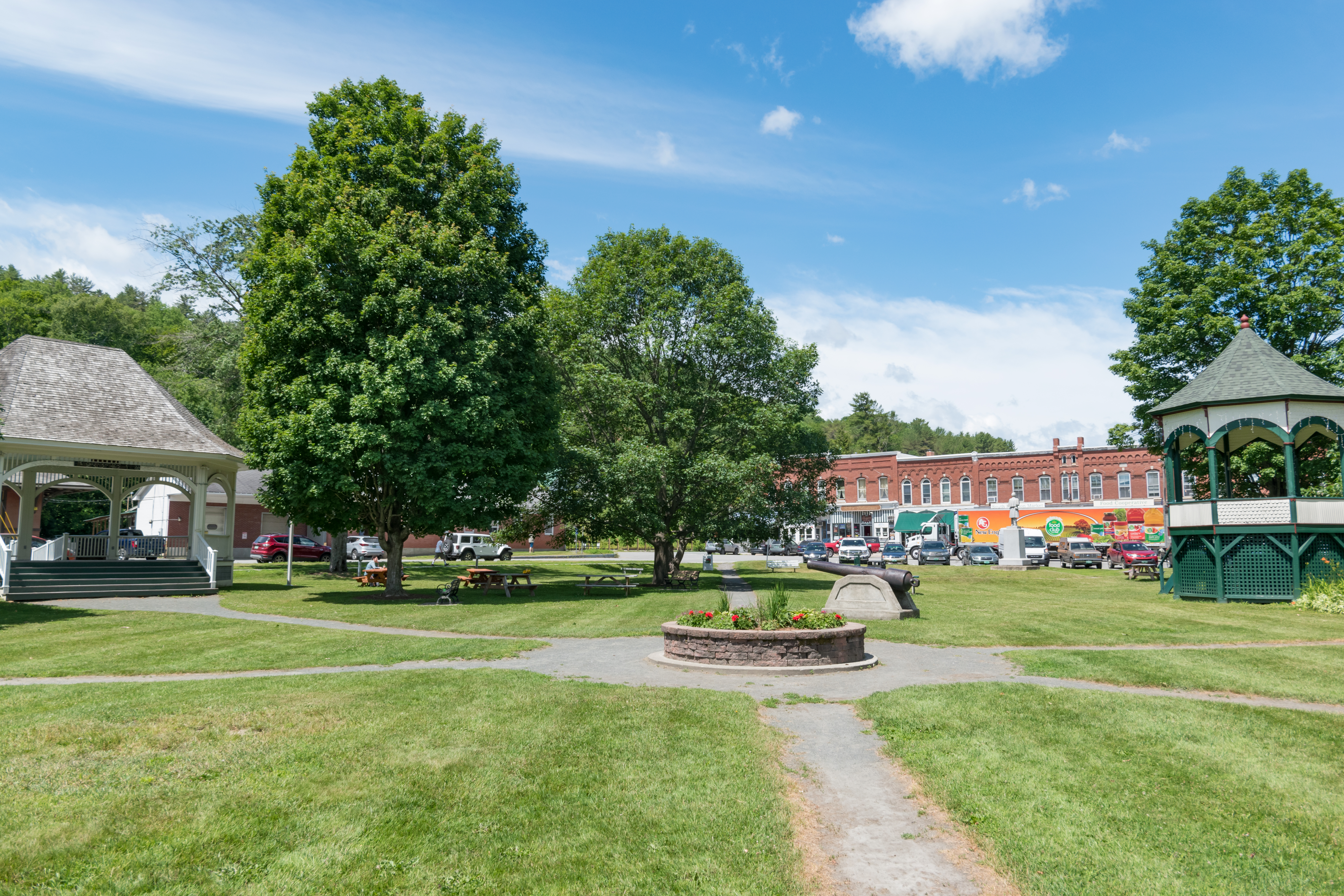
- Interactive map of South Royalton Green
- Type: Public park
- Location: South Royalton, Vermont, U.S.
- Coordinates: 43.81984°N 72.52110°W
- Opened: c. 1856

The South Royalton Green is a historic public park in the center of South Royalton, Vermont.

== Attributes ==
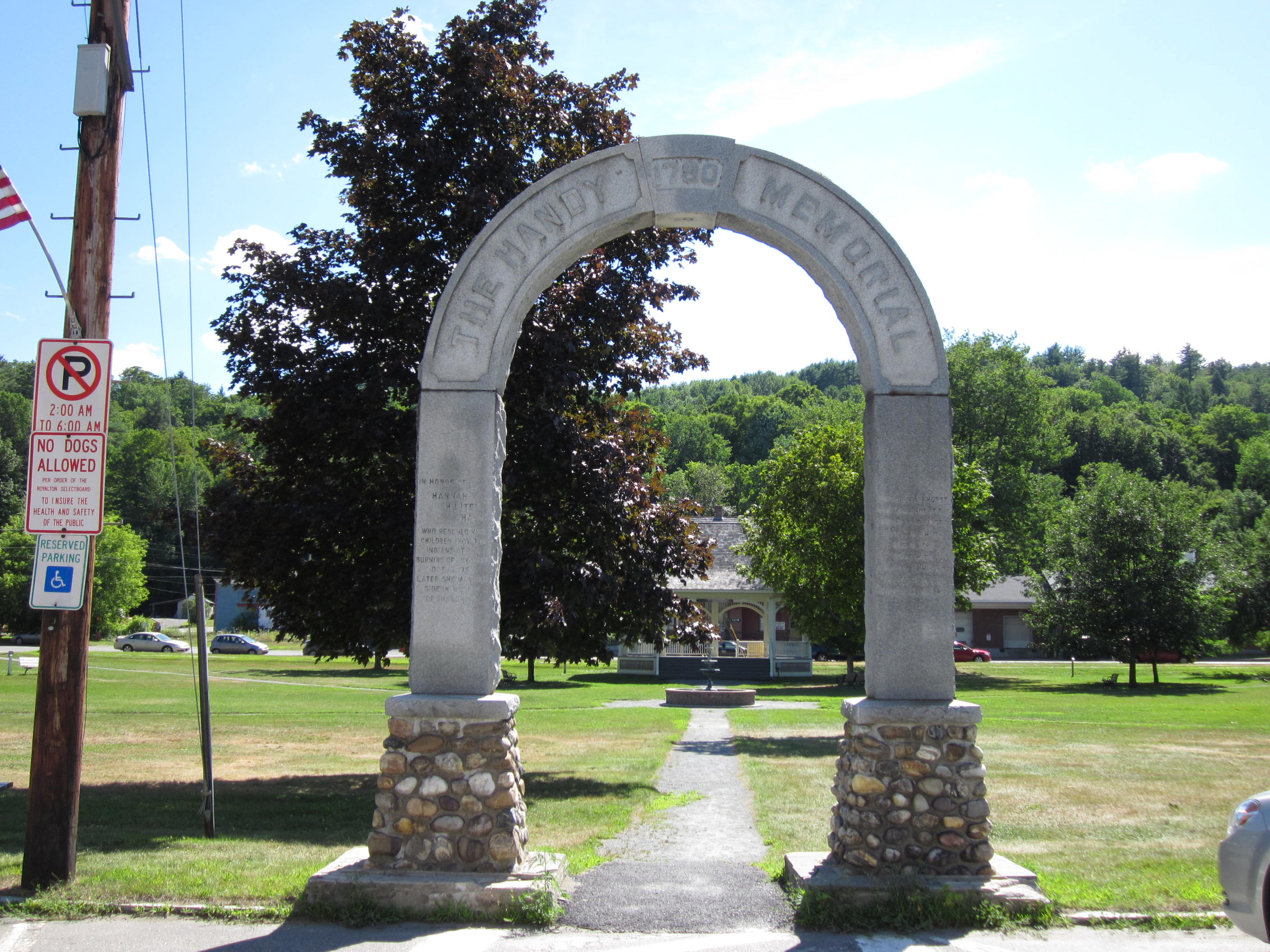
The Handy Memorial

The park has numerous features, including one contributing to the South Royalton Historic District: the South Royalton Park Bandstand. The octagonal wood-framed gazebo was built in the Queen Anne style in 1892.

The park also features a fountain at the center of the park (originally a two-tier cast iron fountain), a cannon, a granite Civil War statue, and a granite memorial to Royalton residents who served in the World Wars, Korean War, and Vietnam War. The largest memorial is a stilted granite arch, the Handy Memorial (1915), commemorating Hannah Hunter Handy who rescued nine children following the Royalton raid. Other features of the park include paths bisecting the lawns regularly, intersecting at the fountain, trees at the park's borders and interspersed, and wrought-iron benches.

Near the park, in the center of Chelsea St., lies a round granite water trough surrounded by a granite curb. The trough was installed for horses, though today it serves as a planter for flowers and a buffer to slow automobile traffic around the commercial area. It was installed in 1912 during the Old Home Days movement, replacing a wooden trough previously located there. It was paid for by the South Royalton Women's Club, and has an inscription reading "Erected 1912 by So. Royalton Women's Club / Public Benefit Society". Town residents rejected several proposals to move the trough, including to the edge of the park. No serious accidents have taken place there, though the granite is cracked from a fire built inside on a Halloween past. The trough is not listed on state or national historic registers, though it would contribute to an updated national historic district listing.

== History ==
The park was part of the Joseph Parkhurst lot, and later became part of the Lyman Benson farm. In 1849, the Vermont Central Railroad bought several acres of land near Benson's rail depot, including the park land. The space changed hands numerous times, including to George Tarbell in 1868, with a stipulation that it be used for a park. It was a common space for residents as early as 1856, though 1856 and 1869 maps also show a harness shop, tin shop, and a dwelling on the site. In 1878, its three owners joined with numerous other local residents to form a plan for the park's purchase. Ownership was divided into 100 shares, which 41 people purchased, with a stipulation that the park be deeded to South Royalton, whenever it becomes an incorporated village.

What was known as "the common" was established as the South Royalton Park in 1878 and the state legislature passed an act to incorporate the South Royalton Park Association on November 1 of that year.

In 1886, following a fire that destroyed the village's commercial center, the town chose to only rebuild on the west portion of Chelsea St. Its selectmen purchased the lots on the east side of Chelsea for $3,175. The town then expanded Chelsea Street as well as the park, reportedly doubling the latter's size. The first known maps formally designating the park were made in 1887. In 1886, the park's fountain was installed, and in 1887, a new fence was installed, walkways were repaired, and new walks were laid. By 1911, the park was still privately owned, though with free use to the public.

Neither the park nor any of its features were included in the State Register-listed Depot Square Historic District, designated in 1973, though a town study in 2018 indicated that these elements would contribute to an expanded and updated National Register listing.

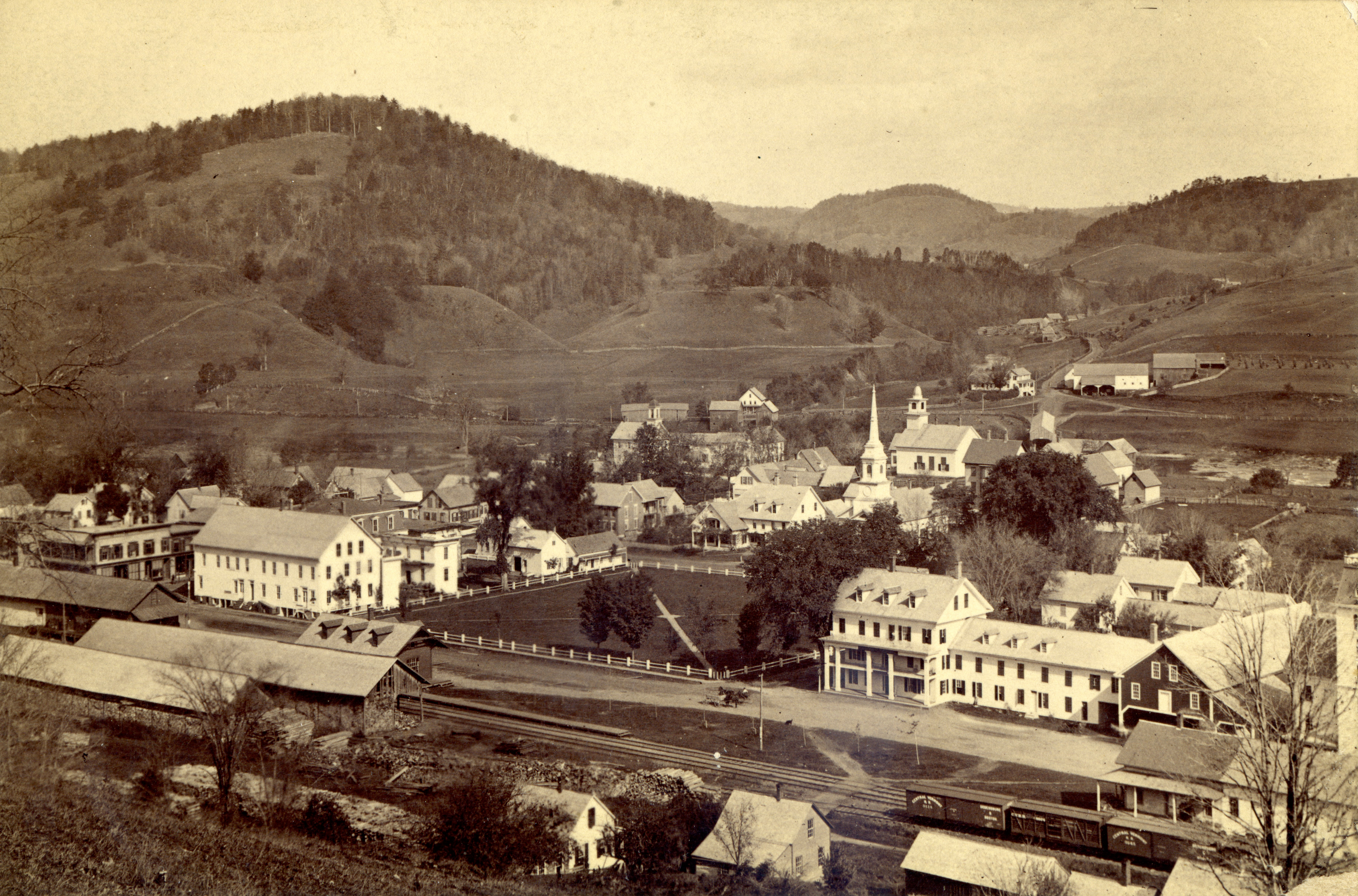
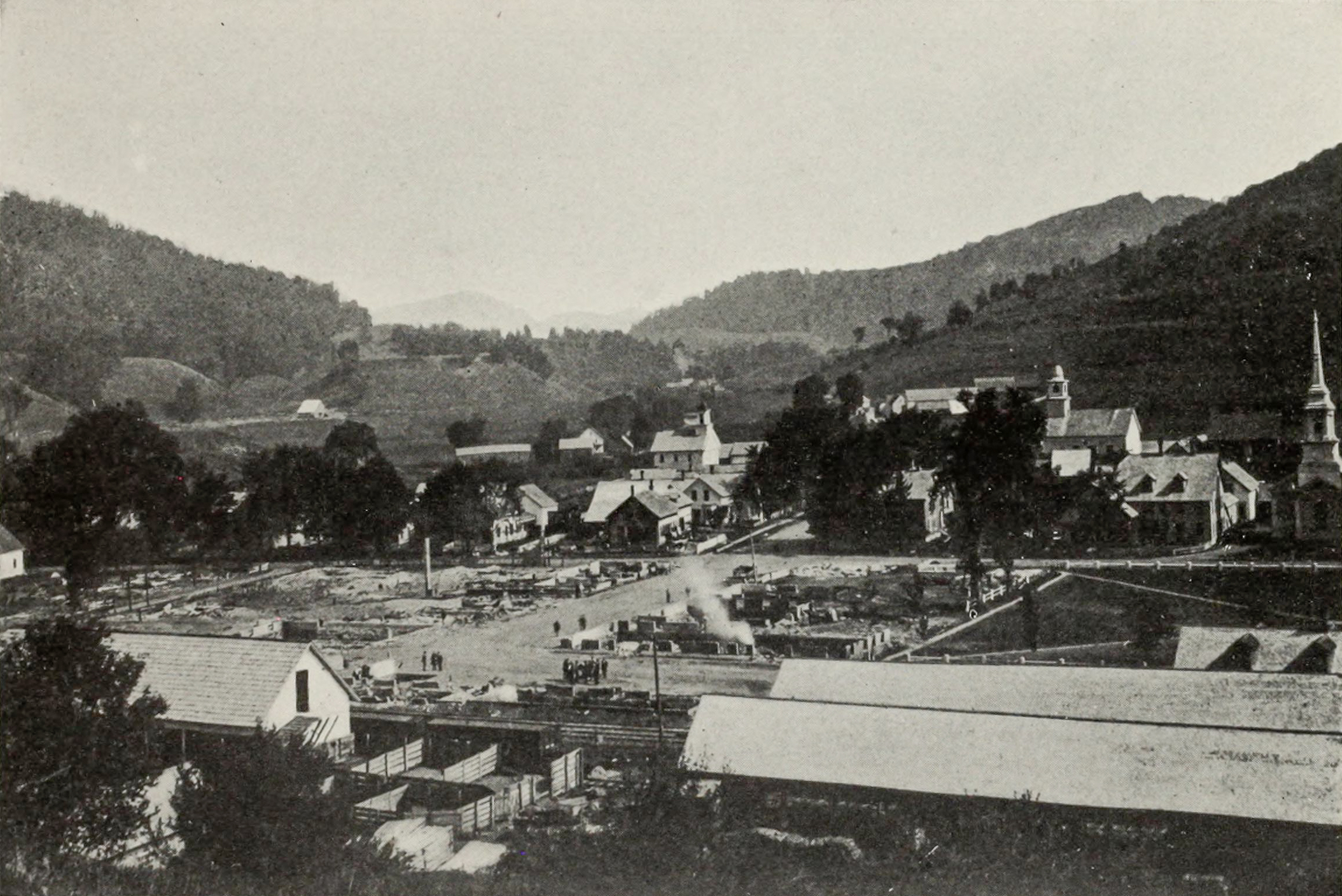
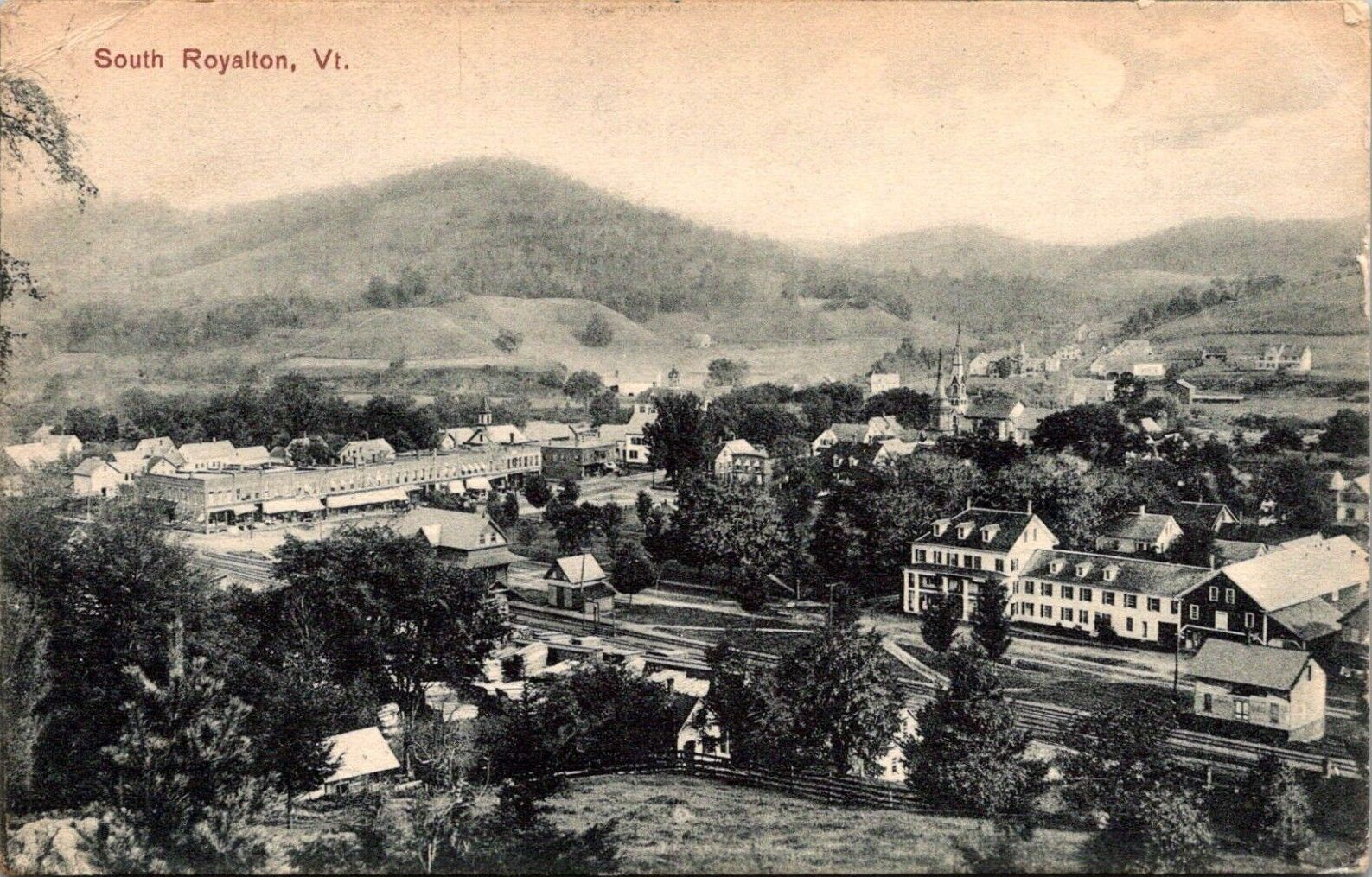
The park and village before the 1886 fire; soon afterward; and after rebuilding
