= South Royalton dome house =

Off-grid residence in Vermont, US

A vacant dome house stands in a forested area of South Royalton, Vermont. The now-abandoned residence was designed and constructed in the 2000s by Jamie Mantzel, a reclusive inventor and social media personality. He constructed a three-story house and several outbuildings there, living with his family off-the-grid for years.

== Attributes ==
The house and its outbuildings were constructed in the wilderness, on a 21.25-acre (8.60 ha) parcel about a mile from Pluck Hill Road in Royalton. The three-story house was built on a rock ledge, with ropes strung to allow access to the entrance. It was built inaccessible to cars, necessitating passing a field, pond, deep forest, and a concrete tunnel.

The house was designed in a dome shape due to the shape's strength, and built using metal pipes encased in translucent white plastic. Its materials were primarily salvaged, donated, or purchased from Craigslist. The first floor had a kitchen, bathroom, bedroom, and a mud room with storage. The floor is made of concrete, which stays cool. The second floor, made from hand-hewed boards and accessible via a ladder, was a craft area decorated with Mantzel's artwork. The third floor was entirely a trampoline, made up of chain-link fencing, and strong enough to support ten people at a time. The room was used to watch DVDs, using a projector and screen.

The residence was designed to be completely off the grid. It utilized passive solar heating along with a wood stove constructed from a 55-gallon metal drum, which is also used for cooking (the family would cook all their own meals). Electricity was generated from a modified bicycle as well as several solar panels, and was used for a Mac laptop, a 3-D printer, and a few 5-watt lightbulbs.

Other buildings on the property have included a springhouse, also constructed in a dome, and what Mantzel called "the Banana Building", a Quonset hut-style building used for storage and as a workshop. Mantzel also built a lumber mill building a short distance up the hill from his house.

== History ==
Mantzel, originally from Hamilton, Ontario, first visited the U.S. when recruited to run track and field events at a college in the country. He attended Brown University as an engineering student, and switched his major to art after one semester. He graduated in 1999 and soon afterward moved to the Vermont woods, where he spent the last 10 years, as of 2012.

The house was built in about six months' time, while the foundation took an additional month to construct. Mantzel spent his first full winter in the house in 2008-2009, and lived at the house with his partner and their two young children. He would make a modest living of about $5,000 per year at the time through YouTube ads and soliciting donations from YouTube viewers and readers on his website; his YouTube channel has included hundreds of videos featuring his inventions and house.

While living at the house, Mantzel designed toys; Wired called him "probably the internet's most popular toymaker". His most significant project was a spider-like robot made of aluminum and steel, 12 feet tall and 18 feet wide. The robot was a prototype for a smaller toy, the "Attacknid", picked up for development by a British company called "Wow! Stuff". The effort, what he called the "Giant Robot Project", went viral, attracting 2 million views in three days.

== See also ==
- Cape Romano Dome House
- R. Buckminster Fuller and Anne Hewlett Dome Home
