= United Baptist Church of Lakeport =

Historic church in New Hampshire, United States

- U.S. National Register of Historic Places
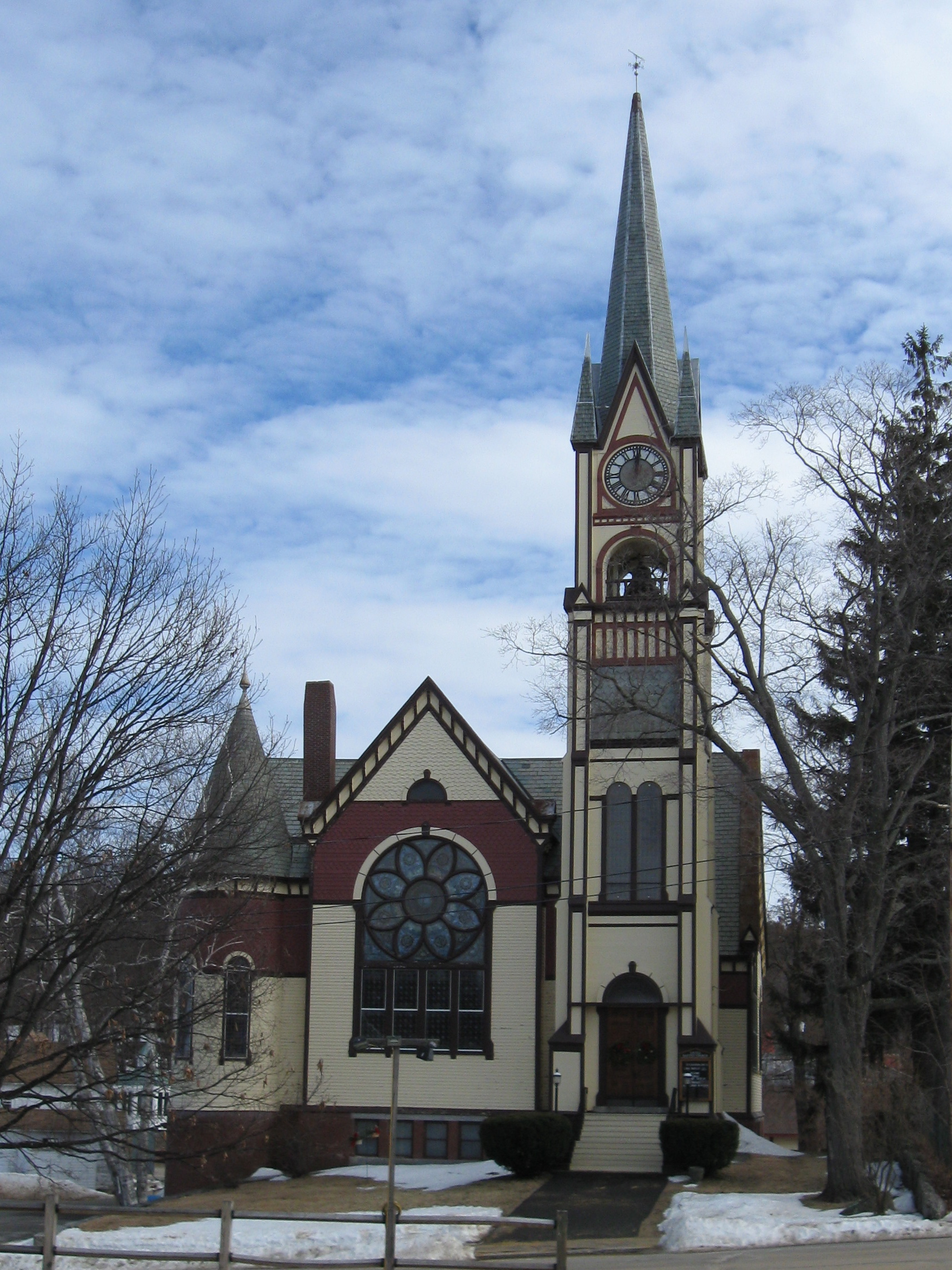

- Location within New Hampshire Location within the United States
- Location: 35 Park St., Laconia, New Hampshire
- Coordinates: 43°32′56″N 71°27′48″W
- Area: 0.5 acres (0.20 ha)
- Built: 1891
- Architect: George H. Guernsey
- Architectural style: Late Victorian
- NRHP reference No.: 85001198
- Added to NRHP: June 06, 1985

United Baptist Church of Lakeport (also known as Lake Village Free Baptist Church or Park Street Baptist Church) is a historic church at 35 Park Street in the village of Lakeport in Laconia, New Hampshire, United States. Built in 1891 after a fire destroyed an older church, it is an eclectic local example of Late Victorian architecture. It was listed on the National Register of Historic Places in 1985.

== Architecture and history ==
The United Baptist Church of Lakeport is located in the village of Lakeport, on a lot extending to both Park Street and Railroad Avenue. It is a 2 1/2-story wood-frame structure, with a steeply pitched gable roof. It is basically cruciform in plan, with wide gabled transepts projecting from the sides. On the facade facing Park Street, the transept is flanked on one side by a two-stage tower capped by a conical turret, and the other by a five-stage square tower. The lower level of the building is faced in brick, while the upper levels are finished in a variety of decoratively cut shingles and ornamental corner boards and trim. Windows typically have round-arch heads, as do the openings of the belfry in the main tower.

The church was built in 1891 by the Lake Village Free Will Baptist congregation. It is Victorian Romanesque in design, and the interior sanctuary is Federal in design. It seats 400 and includes the fellowship and Sunday School classes on the first floor.

The church congregation was founded in 1774 on Parade Road as Laconia's First Church. It has changed many times during the years. The United Baptist Church is a 1934 merger of the Union Avenue Baptist Church that was Calvinist (Predestination) and the Park Street Baptist Church that was Free Will in theology. The Union Avenue Baptist Church was torn down, and the Park Street Church became home to the present congregation. A separate parish house (offices) is next door on Park Street. It was painted white, but several years ago it was repainted in the original 1800s colors. The congregation is affiliated with the American Baptist Churches of Vermont/New Hampshire and the American Baptist Churches USA (originally the Northern Baptist Convention).

== See also ==
- National Register of Historic Places listings in Belknap County, New Hampshire
