= Debevoise Hall =

Historic building in Royalton, Vermont

- Schoolhouse
- U.S. Historic district – Contributing property
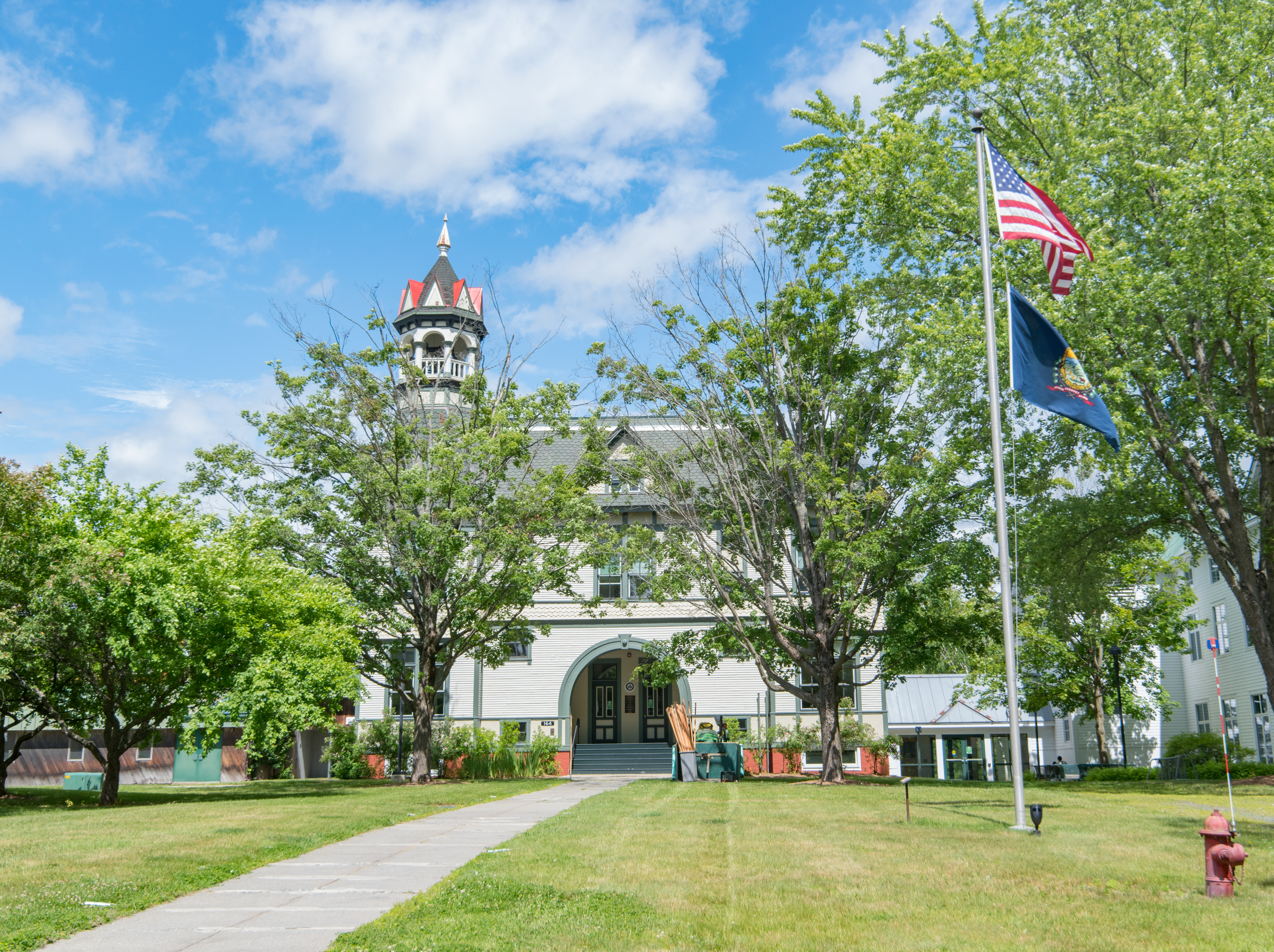
- Location: 164 Chelsea St., South Royalton, Vermont
- Coordinates: 43.821895°N 72.521214°W
- Built: 1892
- Architect: George H. Guernsey (possible)
- Architectural style: Queen Anne
- Part of: South Royalton Historic District (ID76000200)

Debevoise Hall is the main academic building of the Vermont Law School, in South Royalton, Vermont. The Queen Anne-style structure was built in 1892 as Royalton's schoolhouse, and became the law school's first building in 1973. The building contributes to the South Royalton Historic District, on the National Register of Historic Places.

== Attributes ==
The original building is designed in the Queen Anne style. It has a wood frame, 2.5 stories, clapboard siding, and a brick foundation. The southeast corner of the building is topped with an ornate eight-sided belfry. The building was likely designed by George H. Guernsey, who designed the South Royalton business block.

The school building is a contributing part of the South Royalton Historic District, on the National Register of Historic Places.

== History ==
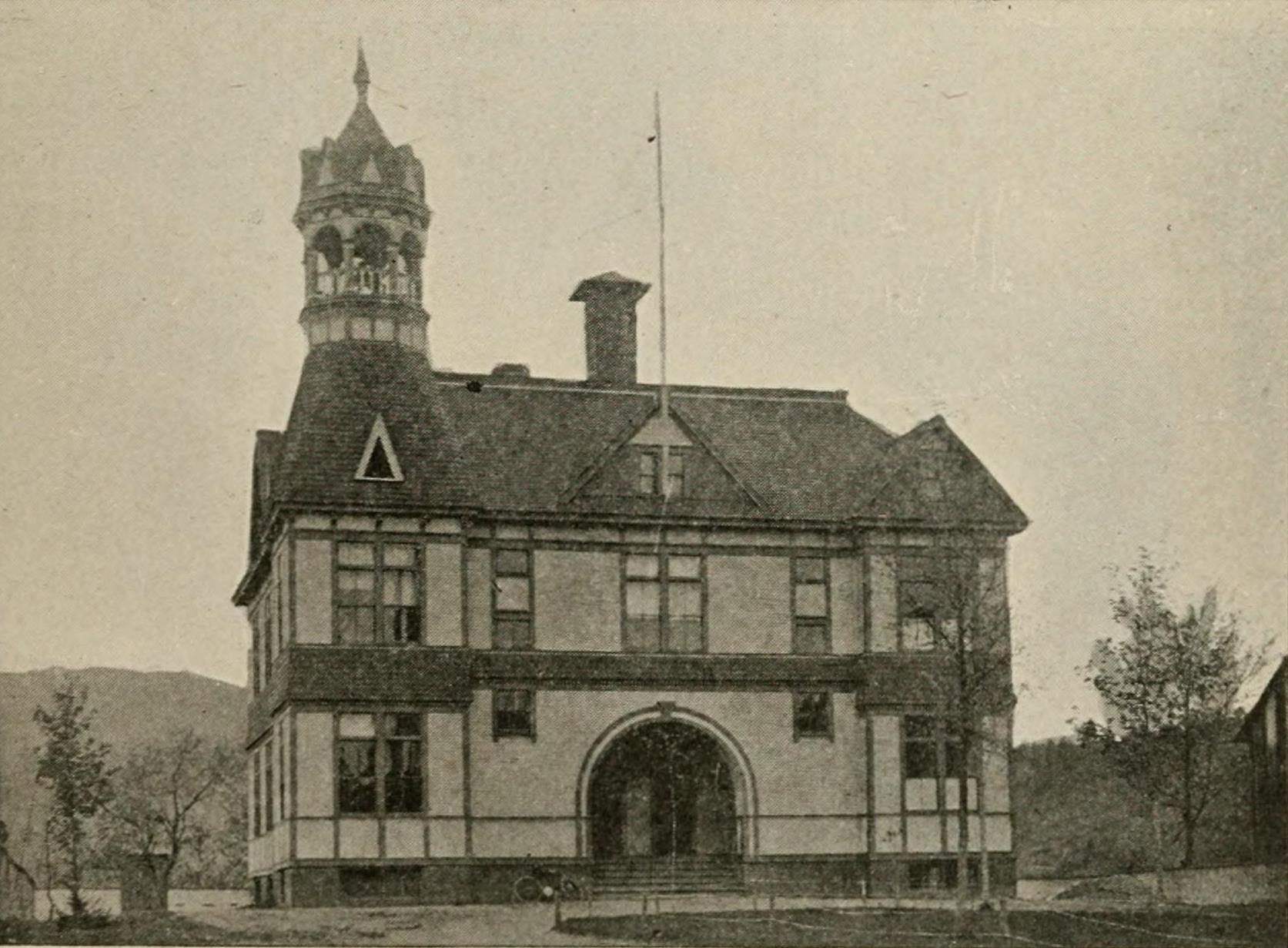
The schoolhouse c. 1915

The oldest building on the campus, it was originally the town's schoolhouse, built in 1892, with an addition constructed in 1911. In 1973, it became the original Vermont Law School building. In 2005, the building was renovated and renamed Debevoise Hall, after the second dean of the Law School, Thomas M. Debevoise, who served as dean from 1974 to 1982.

Practicing what it preaches, the Law School emphasized environmental concerns in the renovation, as well as historical preservation and design efficiency. Debevoise Hall was the only LEED Silver Certified renovation building project in the state of Vermont.

Debevoise Hall continues to serve as classroom space and now also houses administration offices, the Environmental Law Center, and the Yates Common Room.

== See also ==
- National Register of Historic Places listings in Windsor County, Vermont
