= Chelsea Street Bridge (Royalton, Vermont) =

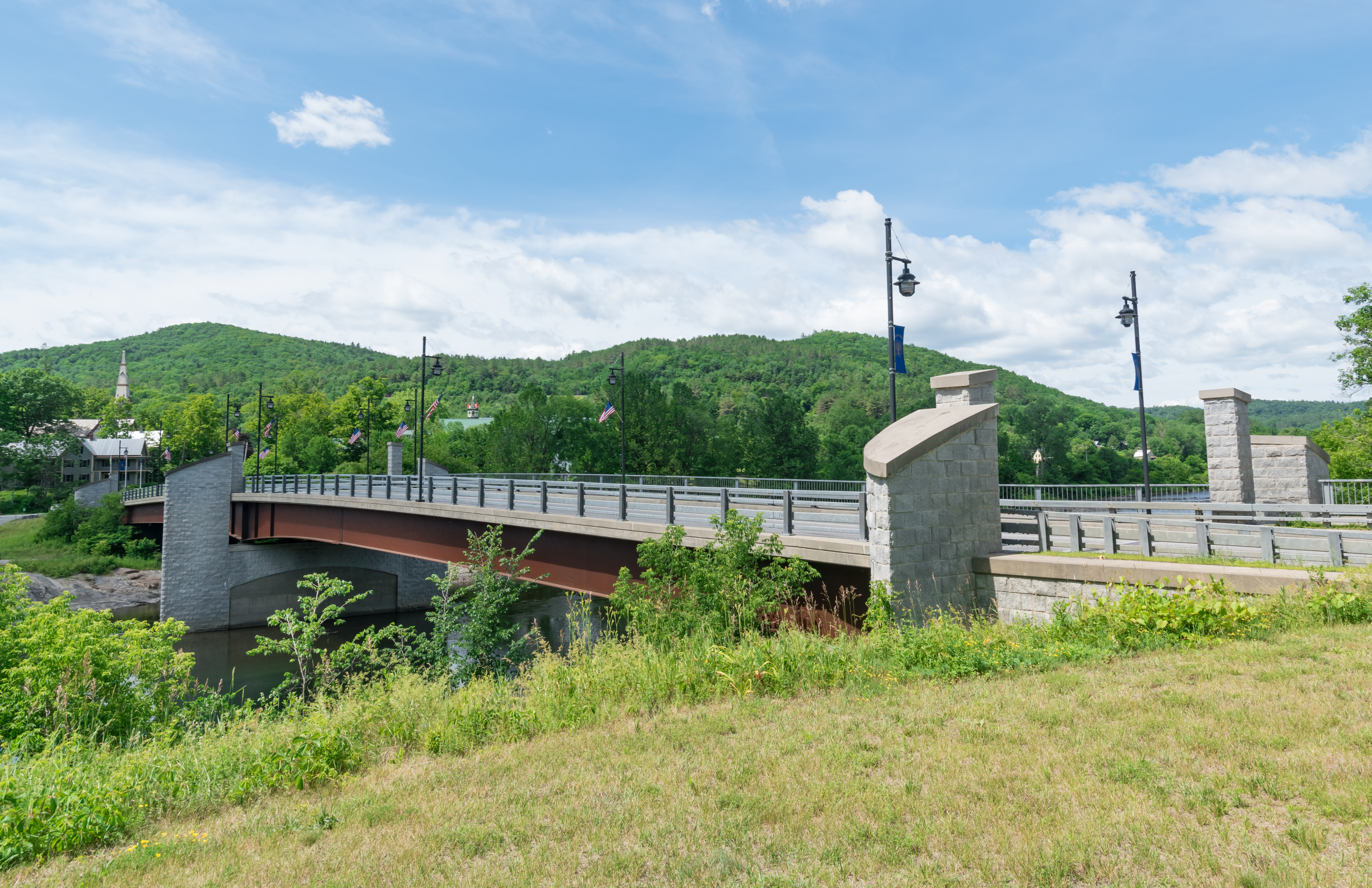
- Coordinates: 43.823067°N 72.519290°W
- Carries: Chelsea Street
- Crosses: White River
- Locale: South Royalton, Vermont

Characteristics
- Material: Steel, Vermont granite
- No. of lanes: 1 northbound, 1 southbound, 1 pedestrian

History
- Construction start: 2000
- Construction end: 2002
- Opened: August 12, 2002
- Replaces: Chelsea Street Bridges from 1848, 1903, and 1935
- Chelsea Street Bridge
- U.S. Historic district – Contributing property
- Part of: South Royalton Historic District (ID76000200)
- Added to NRHP: September 3, 1776

Location
- Interactive map of Chelsea Street Bridge

The Chelsea Street Bridge is a bridge in South Royalton, Vermont, spanning over the White River. The original bridge was constructed in 1848, followed by several replacements. The current bridge was completed in 2002.

== Attributes ==
The Chelsea Street Bridge spans over the White River, carrying Chelsea Street south from Vermont Route 110 into the village of South Royalton. Chelsea Street is the major axis of the village, and the bridge is considered the "main entrance to the village".

It has two vehicular lanes, as well as a sidewalk on its upriver side, allowing pedestrians a view of the White River. It is adorned with Vermont granite, sourced from Woodbury, making up the piers and abutments of the structure.

The bridge has a slight, gradual curve to it, allowing Chelsea Street and Route 110 to line up. The curve is more subtle than the prior structure, which had an "infamous crook" in it, as it was built using an older approach. The bridge's sharp turn served to slow down automobile traffic entering the pedestrian-oriented village.

== History ==
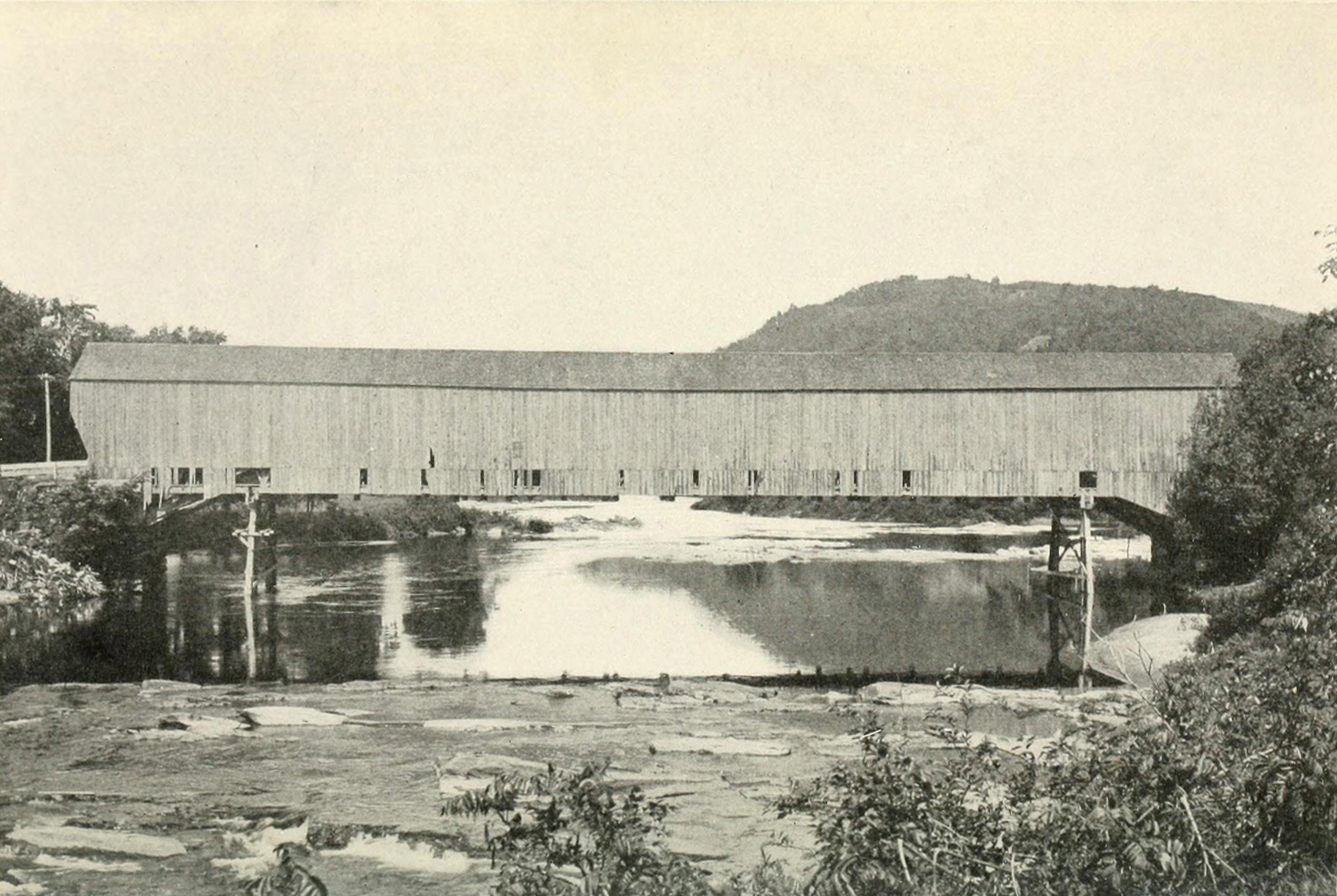
First bridge at the site

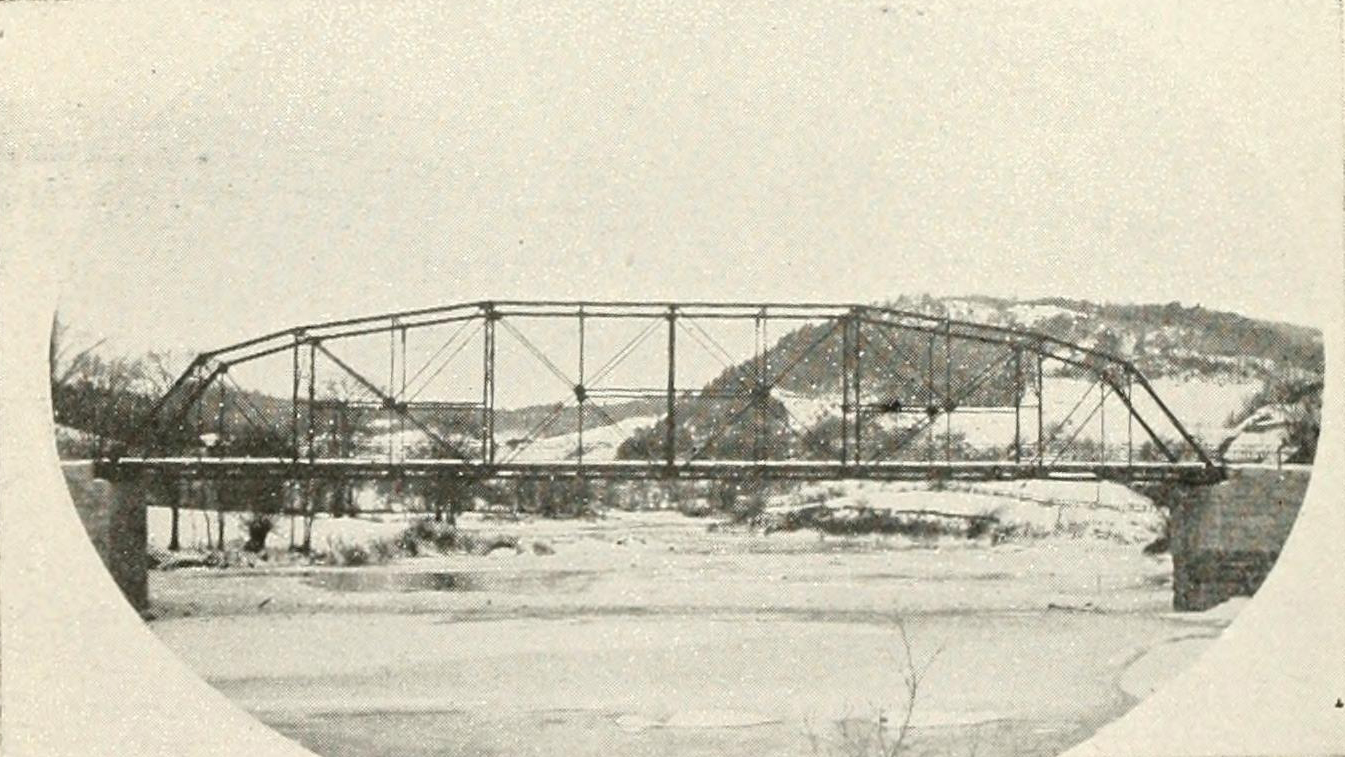
1903 bridge

A bridge was planned on the site as early as Daniel Tarbell Jr. planned South Royalton. At the time, some residents would cross the ford-way, or cross the bridge in the village of Royalton, which Tarbell did not want to encourage. The town and its road committee were not responsive, so Tarbell convinced several residents to promise money in signing a subscription paper. Contractors were hired, and so the first bridge, a covered bridge made of wood, was completed in 1848.

The new bridge connected the new village of South Royalton to the rest of Royalton, and later to the stagecoach route to Chelsea and Tunbridge (present-day Route 110). It was a toll bridge, with gates, a gate keeper, and a few cents' toll. This bridge was torn down in 1903, replaced with a single-lane camelback iron truss bridge, with a cost of $12,282, including about $5,000 for the abutments. Though the iron bridge was the only bridge on the White River to withstand the Great Flood of 1927, the village's approach to the bridge washed away, leaving a 150-foot chasm. A two-lane bridge extension was built of concrete to fill the gap. The 1903 bridge was removed in 1935, after which a new iron bridge was built. The new bridge was a two-lane Parker through truss bridge, and cost $30,021. The bridge was comparable to others built after the 1927 flood, and was identical to Bethel's River Street Bridge, built in 1928.

The c. 1935 bridge contributed to the South Royalton Historic District, listed on the National Register of Historic Places in 1976

=== Present-day structure ===
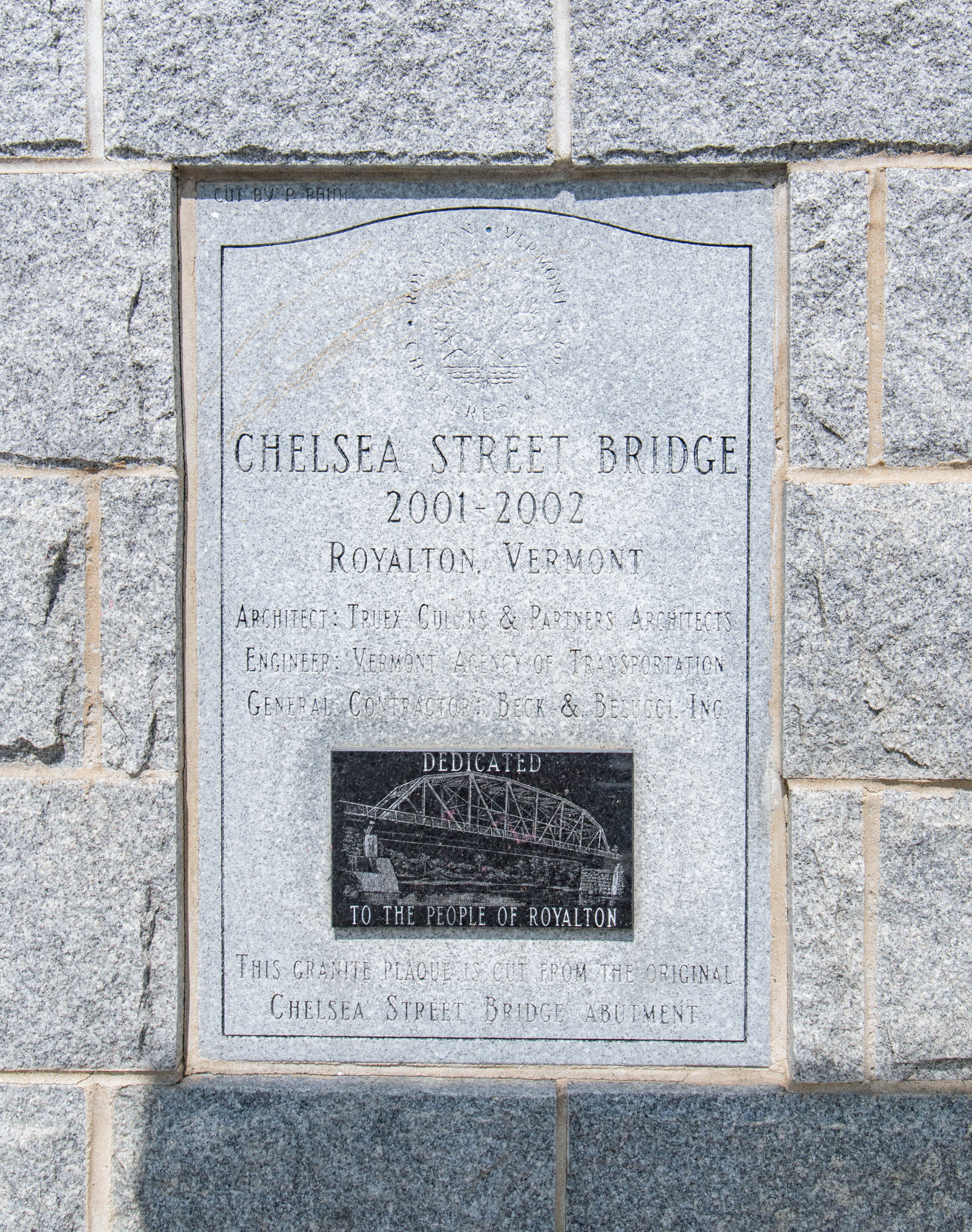
Plaque on the modern bridge

The bridge was initially planned by state engineers and the Two River Ottauquechee Regional Planning Commission, with the Burlington-based architects Truex, Collins and Partners designing the structure. Construction began in the winter of 2000.

The bridge design was adjusted by the Royalton Selectboard, which worked with Vermont's legislature to change bridge design standards. At the time, small villages had to meet bridge standards applying to other states, and the Royalton board made it possible to construct a smaller bridge, more in keeping with the landscape.

The bridge's opening ceremony was held on August 10, 2002. It was catered by the South Royalton House, with locally-donated food and a concert by the town's band. It opened to vehicular traffic on August 12, after which the old iron bridge was removed.

The bridge was undamaged following Hurricane Irene, unlike many in the region.
