= George H. Guernsey =

American architect

- Born: December 10, 1839; Calais, Vermont
- Died: November 28, 1900 (aged 60); Montpelier, Vermont
- Resting place: Green Mount Cemetery, Montpelier, Vermont
- Occupation: Architect

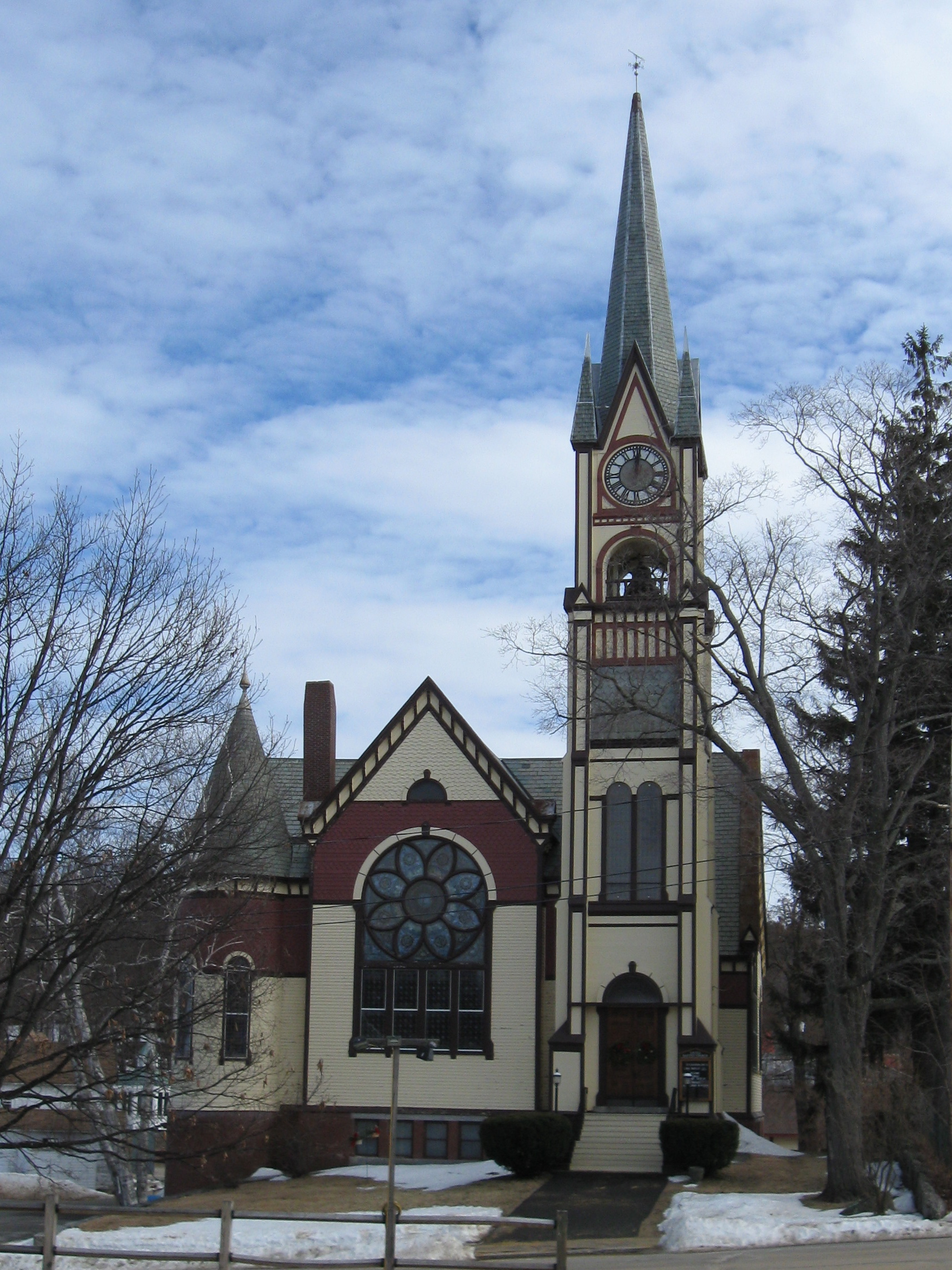
Baptist Church, Lakeport, 1891.

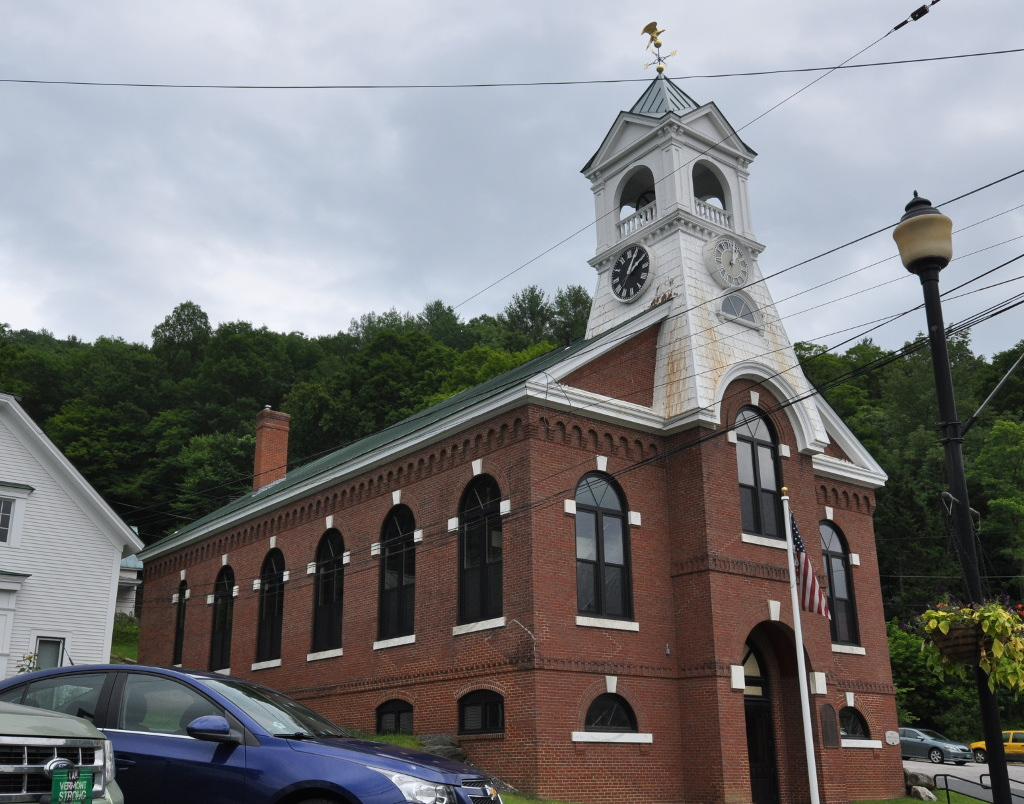
Town Hall, Bethel, 1891.

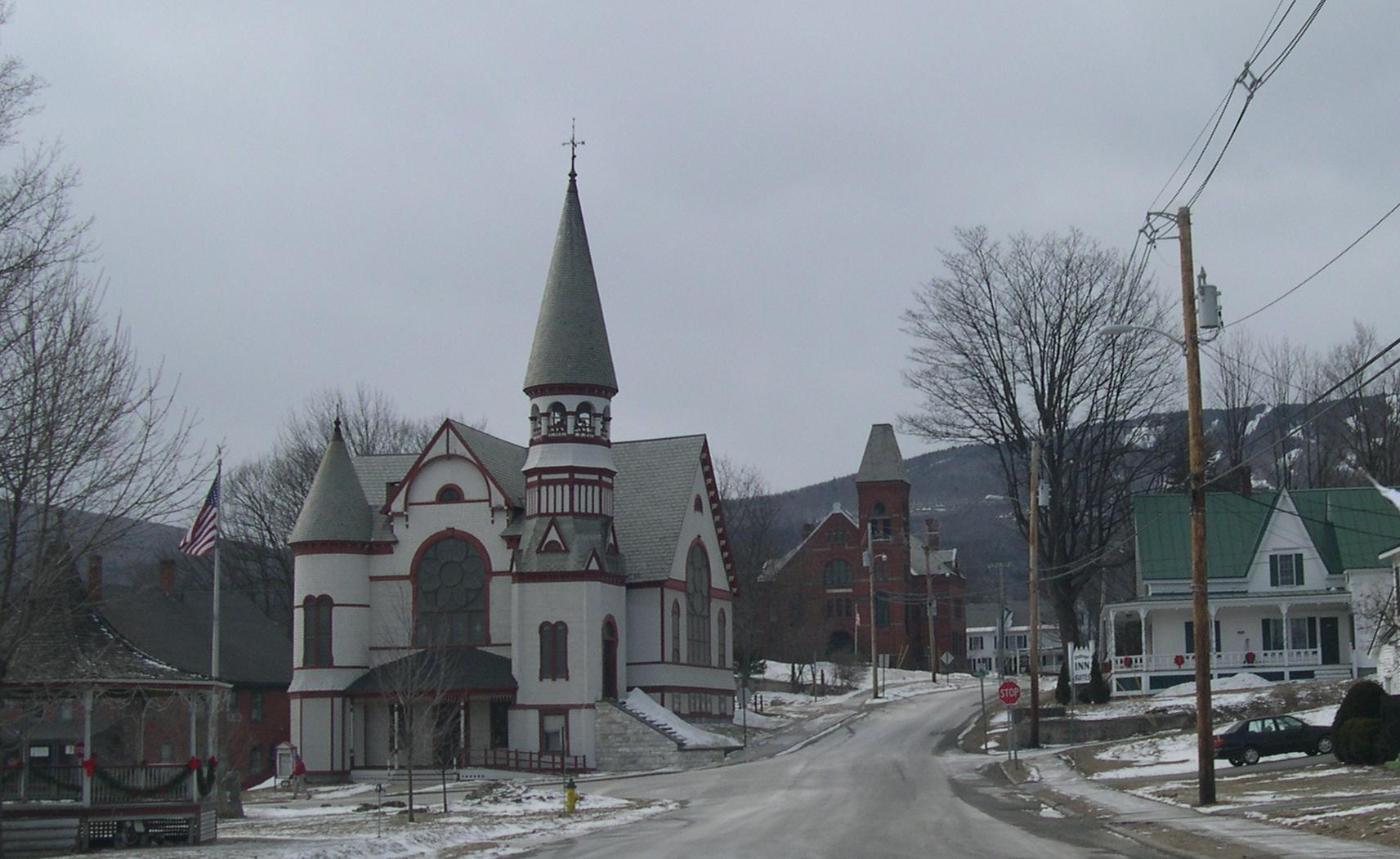
Baptist Church, Ludlow, 1892.

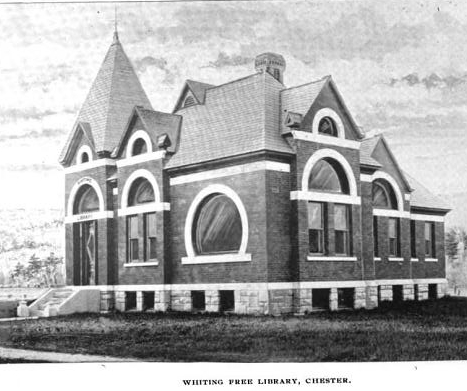
Whiting Library, Chester, 1892.

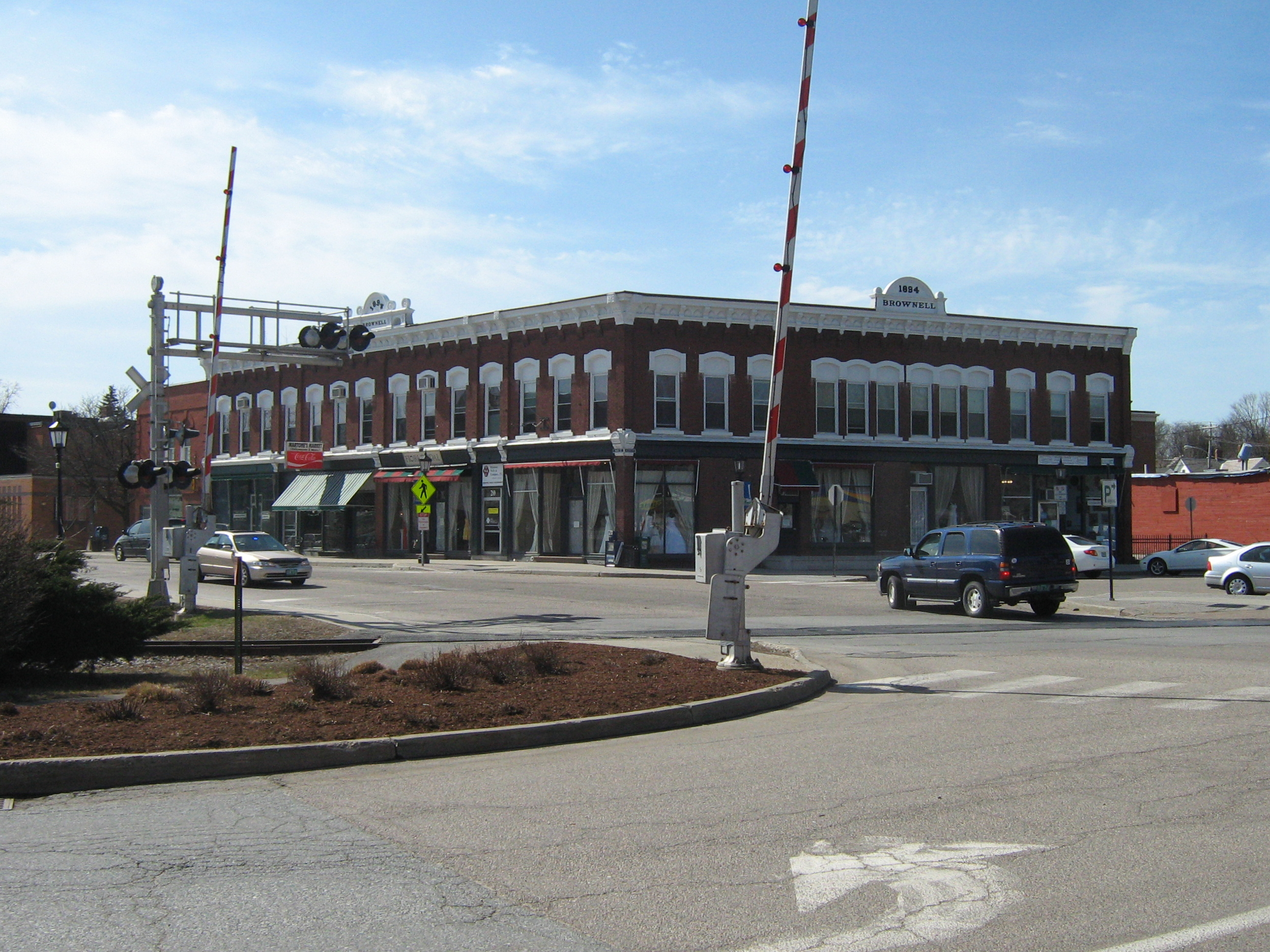
Brownell Block, Essex Junction, 1894.

George H. Guernsey (December 10, 1839 – November 28, 1900) was an American architect from Montpelier, Vermont.

== Life ==
Guernsey was born on December 10, 1839, in Calais, Vermont, to Gilman and Clotina (Southwick) Guernsey. He served in the Civil War, after which he relocated to Montpelier. After working as a builder, he established himself as an architect. He would go on to become the leading architect in Vermont.

In 1897, he was elected as Montpelier's third mayor. He died of tuberculosis at home in 1900. Guernsey was buried at Green Mount Cemetery in Montpelier.

== Legacy ==
Many of Guernsey's buildings contribute to historic districts on the National Register of Historic Places, in addition to one individual structure. In 2013, a book called Vermont's Elusive Architect: George H. Guernsey was published by the Bethel Historical Society, where Guernsey had designed the town hall. The book found Guernsey to be one of the most influential 19th century architects in Vermont.

== Architectural works ==
- 1875 - French's Block, 32 Main St, Montpelier, Vermont
- 1875 - Union Block, 26 State St, Montpelier, Vermont
  - Burned in 1914.
- 1878 - Universalist Church (former), 201 Bridge St, Richmond, Vermont
- 1879 - Walton Block, 17 State St, Montpelier, Vermont
- 1880 - George H. Guernsey House, 68 E State St, Montpelier, Vermont
  - The architect's own residence.
- 1883 - Blanchard Block, 73 Main St, Montpelier, Vermont
- 1884 - St. Charles R. C. Church, 31 Cherry Hill St, Bellows Falls, Vermont
- 1885 - Holy Angels R. C. Church, 246 Lake St, St. Albans, Vermont
- 1886 - Notre Dame de Victoire R. C. Church, Main & Winter Sts, St. Johnsbury, Vermont
  - Burned in 1966.
- 1887 - Barton M. E. Church (former), Church St, Barton, Vermont
- 1888 - Christ M. E. (St. John's) Church, 135 Main St, Lancaster, New Hampshire
- 1888 - St. Francis de Sales R. C. Church, 238 Main St, Bennington, Vermont
- 1889 - Edward Dewey House, 128 State St, Montpelier, Vermont
- 1890 - John W. Burgess House (Redstone), 26 Terrace St, Montpelier, Vermont
- 1891 - Bethel Town Hall, 134 S Main St, Bethel, Vermont
- 1891 - Dodge Hall, Norwich University, Northfield, Vermont
  - Demolished.
- 1891 - Immaculate Heart of Mary R. C. Church, 18 Lincoln Ave, Rutland, Vermont
- 1891 - United Baptist Church, 23 Park St, Lakeport, New Hampshire
- 1891 - St. Thomas R. C. Church, 6 Green St, Underhill, Vermont
- 1892 - Ludlow Baptist Church, 99 Main St, Ludlow, Vermont
- 1892 - St. Augustine R. C. Church, 16 Barre St, Montpelier, Vermont
- 1892 - Whiting Library, 117 Main St, Chester, Vermont
- 1893 - Bradford Academy, 172 N Main St, Bradford, Vermont
- 1893 - Debevoise Hall, Vermont Law School, South Royalton, Vermont
- 1893 - Plymouth Congregational Church (Remodeling), 4 Post Office Sq, Plymouth, New Hampshire
  - Burned.
- 1894 - Brownell Block, 20 Main St, Essex Junction, Vermont
- 1895 - Hotel Barton, 569 Main St, Barton, Vermont
  - Burned.
