= South Royalton, Vermont =

Census-designated place in the US

- Census-designated place
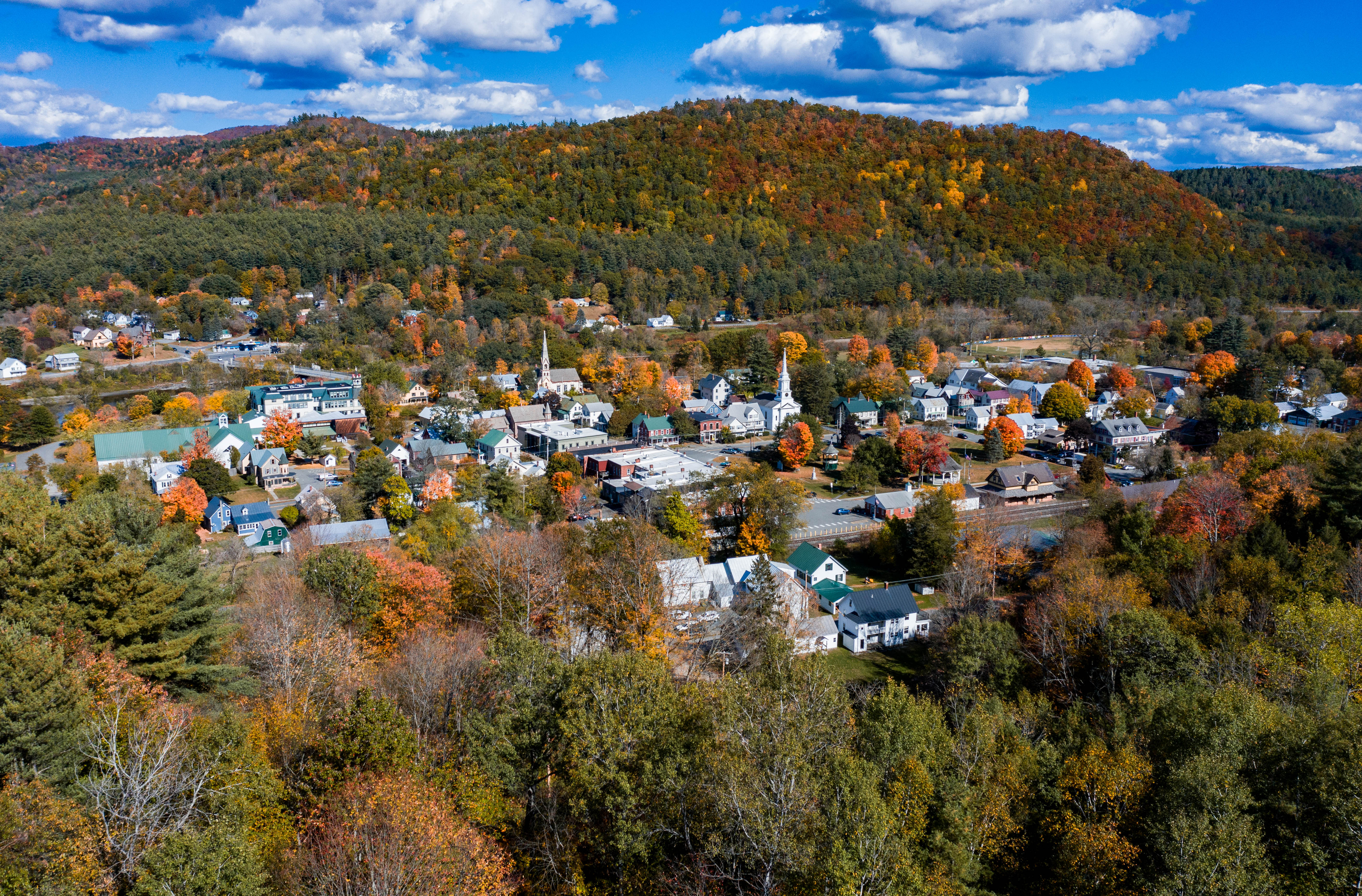
- Fall in South Royalton

- Location in Windsor County and the state of Vermont
- Coordinates: 43°48′44″N 72°30′55″W
- Country: United States
- State: Vermont
- County: Windsor

Area
  - Total: 1.2 sq mi (3.1 km^{2})
  - Land: 1.1 sq mi (2.9 km^{2})
  - Water: 0.077 sq mi (0.2 km^{2})
- Elevation: 607 ft (185 m)

Population (2010)
  - Total: 694
  - Density: 620/sq mi (240/km^{2})
- Time zone: UTC-5 (Eastern (EST))
  - Summer (DST): UTC-4 (EDT)
- ZIP code: 05068
- Area code: 802
- FIPS code: 50-68050
- GNIS feature ID: 2586655

South Royalton is an unincorporated village and census-designated place (CDP) in the town of Royalton, Windsor County, Vermont, United States. As of the 2020 census, South Royalton had a population of 654. South Royalton is the largest community in the town. It is home to the Vermont Law School. The central portion of the village is a historic district, listed on the National Register of Historic Places as the South Royalton Historic District. The Joseph Smith Birthplace Memorial is located approximately two miles to the east. South Royalton is the town pictured in the opening credits of the WB television show Gilmore Girls.

== Geography ==
South Royalton is located in northern Windsor County along the White River. Vermont Route 14 runs along the north side of the river, just outside the CDP limits, leading southeast to White River Junction and northwest to Barre. Vermont Route 110 leads north from South Royalton into Tunbridge. Interstate 89 passes to the west of the village but does not serve it with a direct exit. Access to South Royalton is either from Exit 2 (at Sharon) or Exit 3 (at North Royalton).

== Buildings ==
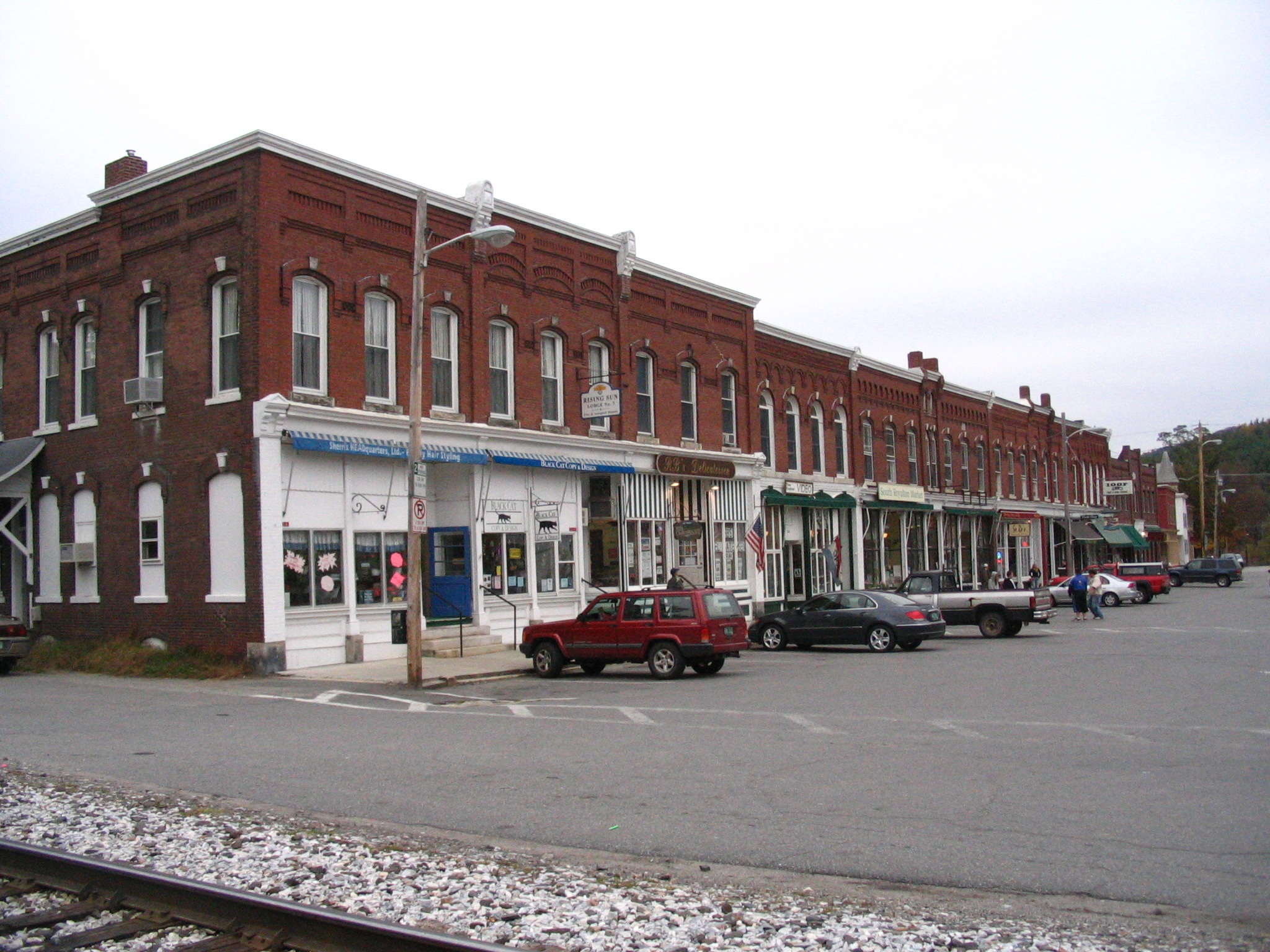
Chelsea St. business block

South Royalton has a row of storefronts on Chelsea St., facing the South Royalton Green. The village also has numerous churches, the Royalton Memorial Library, the South Royalton Railroad Station (now housing a bank), and Vermont Law School buildings including Debevoise Hall (formerly the village schoolhouse).

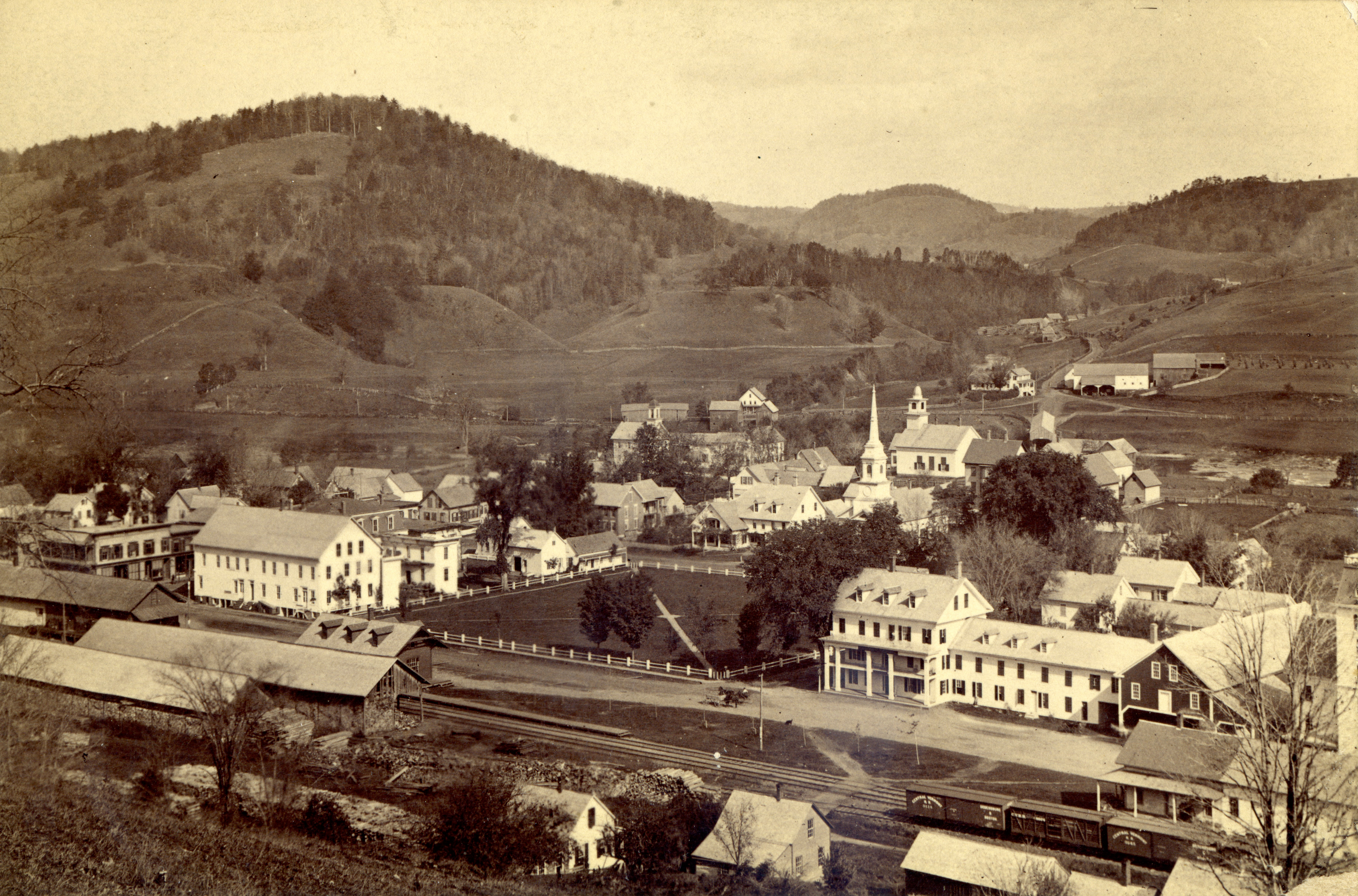
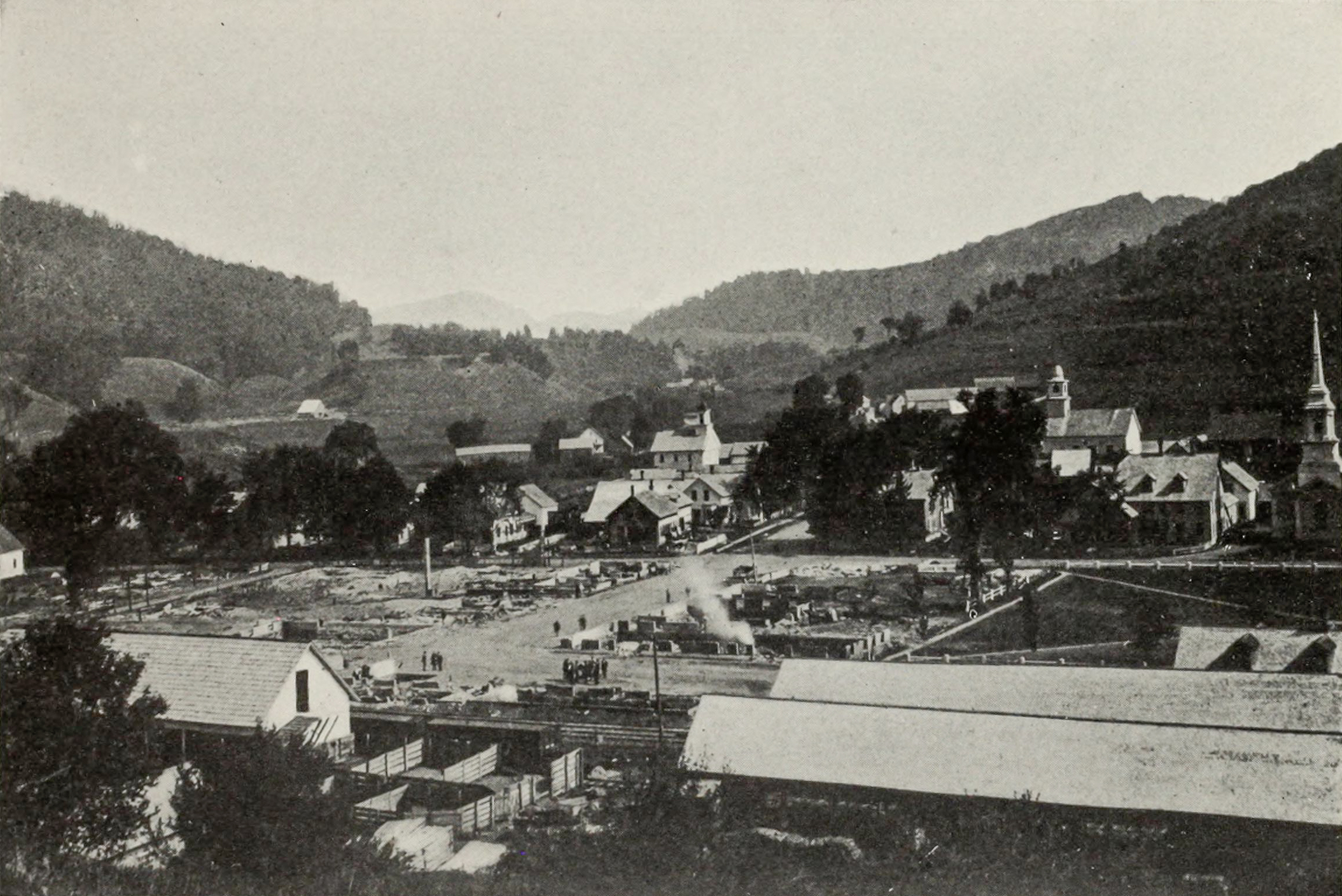
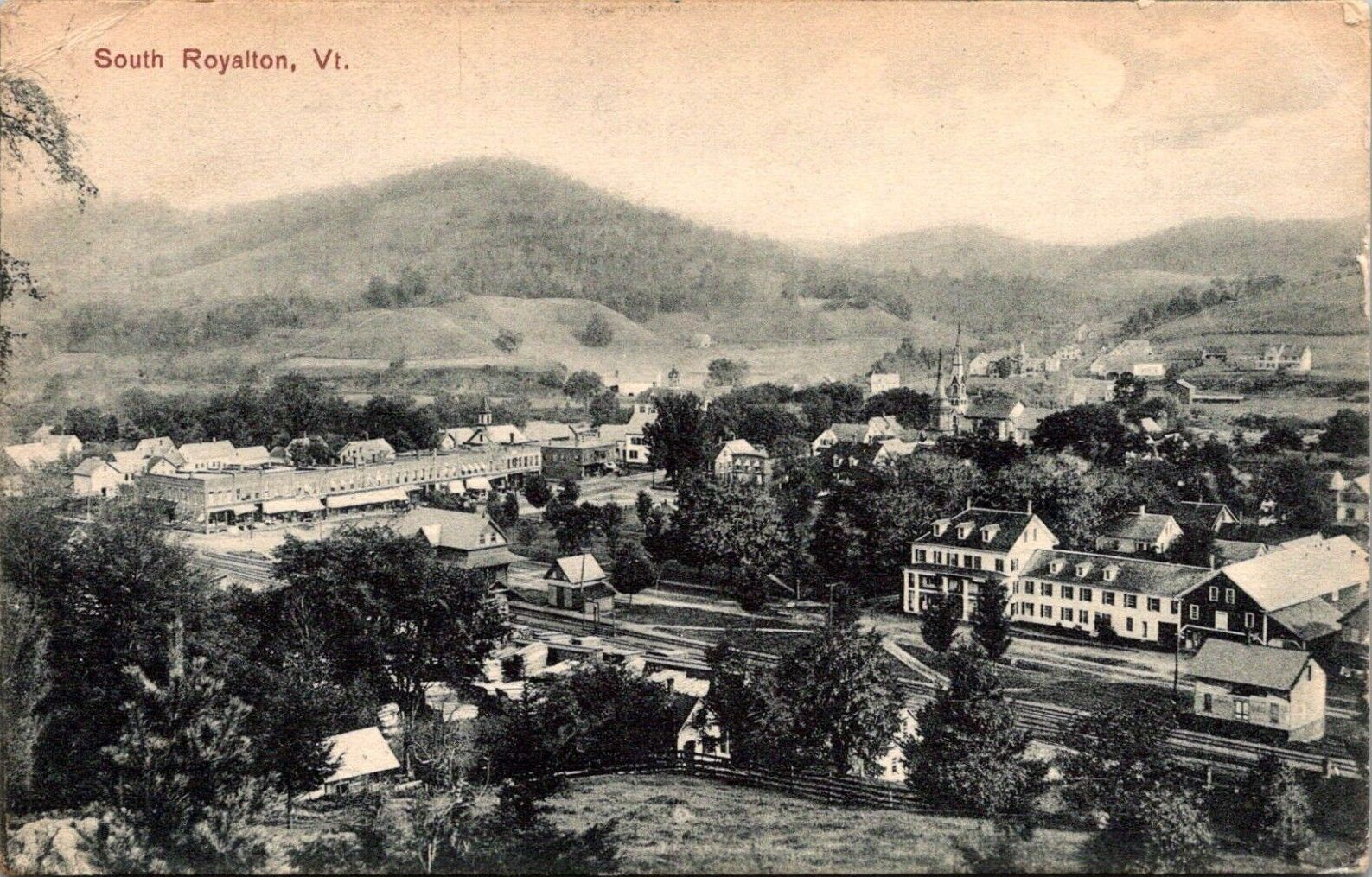
The village before the 1886 fire; soon afterward; and after rebuilding

== See also ==
- List of census-designated places in Vermont
- South Royalton dome house
- Chelsea Street Bridge (Royalton, Vermont)
