= 2006 Burlington, Vermont mayoral election =

Local election in the United States

2006 Burlington mayoral election
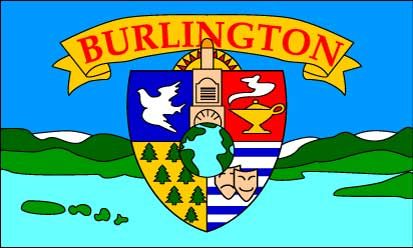
- March 7, 2006
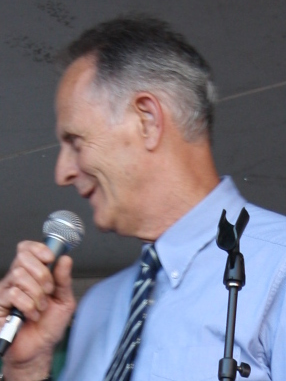

Nominee	Bob Kiss	Hinda Miller	Kevin Curley
Party	Progressive Coalition	Democratic	Republican
First round	3,809; 38.95%	3,106; 31.77%	2,609; 26.68%
Maximum round	4,761; 54.43%	3,986; 45.57%	Eliminated
- First round results by ward Kiss: 40–50% 50–60% Curley: 30–40% 40–50%
Mayor of Burlington before election
Peter Clavelle
Progressive
Elected Mayor of Burlington
Bob Kiss
Progressive

On March 7, 2006, a mayoral election was held in Burlington, Vermont, United States. Incumbent Mayor Peter Clavelle declined to seek reelection and Progressive nominee Bob Kiss was elected to succeed him.

== Background ==
Peter Brownell's victory in the 1993 election against Progressive Coalition Mayor Peter Clavelle was the first time a Republican had won Burlington's mayoralty since Edward A. Keenan left office in 1965, and ended the Progressives' control over the mayoralty which started with Bernie Sanders' victory in the 1981 election. However, Clavelle regained the mayoralty in the 1995 election.

In 2005, voters approved a referendum implementing instant-runoff voting for mayoral elections. Jo LaMarche, the director of elections for Burlington, organized a mock election using the system on January 27, 2006. Burlington was the first place in Vermont to use the voting system.

== Democratic ==
=== Nominee ===
- Hinda Miller, member of the Vermont Senate

=== Eliminated in primary ===
- Andy Montroll, member of the Burlington city council from 6th district and candidate in 2003 mayoral election

=== Withdrew ===
- John Tracy, member of the Vermont House of Representatives

=== Declined ===
- Karen Moran Lafayette, former member of the Vermont House of Representatives

John Tracy announced his campaign on March 16, 2005, but withdrew on September 23. Hinda Miller announced her campaign on September 20, and Andy Montroll announced on September 23. Christine Salembier managed Miller's campaign. Miller and Montroll participated in a 70-minute debate hosted by Town Meeting TV.

The Democratic caucus was held on January 5, 2006. It was the most attended caucus in Burlington Democratic history, beating the previous record set during the 1989 election. Carina Driscoll, a former Progressive member of the city council, voted for Miller in the caucus as the Progressives seemed to not have a candidate. Montroll considered running as an independent after losing the Democratic nomination, but declined on January 19, 2006.

2006 Burlington Democratic mayoral caucus
Party	Candidate	Votes	%
Democratic	Hinda Miller	550	51.84%
Democratic	Andy Montroll	511	48.16%
Total votes		1,061	100.00%

== Progressive ==
=== Nominee ===
- Bob Kiss, member of the Vermont House of Representatives (2001–2006)

=== Declined ===
- Tim Ashe, member of the Burlington city council from the 3rd ward
- Peter Clavelle, 38th and 40th Mayor of Burlington, Vermont (1989–1993; 1995–2006)

Clavelle sought the Democratic mayoral nomination in 2003, and ran with the Democratic nomination in the 2004 gubernatorial election. This angered Progressives, including chair of Burlington's Progressives Tiki Archambeau. Tiki stated that Clavelle was "not the candidate we have in mind" for the 2006 mayoral election. Clavelle announced that he would not run for reelection on September 7, 2005. Bob Kiss won the party's nomination at its caucus on January 8, 2006.

== Republican ==
=== Nominee ===
- Kevin Curley, member of the Burlington city council from the 4th district

=== Eliminated ===
- Kevin Ryan, Republican nominee for city council from 3rd ward in 2001 and 2003 elections

Kevin Curley, the Republican nominee in the 2001 mayoral election, announced his campaign on November 28, 2005. Curley was the only councilor to vote against putting the proposal to use instant runoff voting for mayoral elections onto the ballot. The Republican caucus was held on December 6. Harry Snyder managed Curley's campaign.

2006 Burlington Republican mayoral caucus
Party	Candidate	Votes	%
Republican	Kevin Curley	49	71.01%
Republican	Kevin Ryan	20	28.99%
Total votes		69	100.00%

== Others ==
Ion Laskaris', who served on the city council from 1990 to 1992, campaign announcement in January 2005, made him the first person to announce their campaign for mayor. He planned on running as an independent fusion candidate with the support of the Republican and Democratic parties. He criticized the Democrats for giving their nomination to Clavelle in the 2003 election. He withdrew from the election on January 27, 2006.

Less than ten people attended the Green Party's caucus. Loyal Ploof, a member of the school board and chair of the Burlington Green Party, was given the party's nomination. The active membership of the Green Party in the city was a maximum of seven according to Ploof and receiving 400 votes would be a great success for his candidacy. Craig Chevrier, the former chair of the Vermont Green Party, said that the party was dysfunctional and Ploof was an example of it.

== General election ==
Curley told his supporters to rank Kiss second. Miller spent $66,758,20 during the campaign, $28,188 before the nomination and $38,570 in the general election. Kiss spent $19,788 and Curley spent $11,148. Miller spent $16.75 per vote, Curley spent $4.27 per vote, and Kiss spent $4.15 per vote. Miller had two paid staffers before winning the nomination and then one paid staffer and her campaign manager. Kiss's campaign manager was his only campaign employee.

=== Debates ===
2006 Burlington mayoral election debates
No.	Date & Time	Host	Moderator	Participants				
Key: P Participant A Absent N Non-invitee I Invitee				Progressive	Democratic	Republican	Independent	Green
Key: P Participant A Absent N Non-invitee I Invitee				Bob Kiss	Hinda Miller	Kevin Curley	Louis Beaudin	Loyal Ploof
1	February 13, 2006; 7:30 p.m. EDT	Ohavi Zedek	Mark Kaplan	P	P	P	P	P

=== Endorsements ===
Kiss endorsements

State officials

- Daryl Pillsbury, member of the Vermont House of Representatives (independent)
Miller endorsements

Federal officials

- Patrick Leahy, U.S. Senator from Vermont (1975–2023)

State officials

- Howard Dean, 79th Governor of Vermont (1991–2003)
- Madeleine Kunin, 77th Governor of Vermont (1985–1991)

Local officials

- Peter Clavelle, 38th and 40th Mayor of Burlington, Vermont (1989–1993; 1995–2006)
- Jane Knodell, member of the Burlington city council (Progressive)

== Results ==
2006 Burlington mayoral election
Party	Candidate	Round 1		Round 2	
Party	Candidate	Votes	%	Votes	%
Vermont Progressive	Bob Kiss	3,809	38.95	4,761	54.43
Democratic	Hinda Miller	3,106	31.77	3,986	45.57
Republican	Kevin Curley	2,609	26.68	Eliminated	
Independent	Louis Beaudin	119	1.22	Eliminated	
Green	Loyal Ploof	57	0.58	Eliminated	
Write-in		78	0.80	Eliminated	
Total active votes		9,778	99.90	8,747	89.36
Exhausted ballots		10	0.10	1,041	10.64
Total votes		9,788	100	9,788	100
