= 1997 Burlington, Vermont mayoral election =

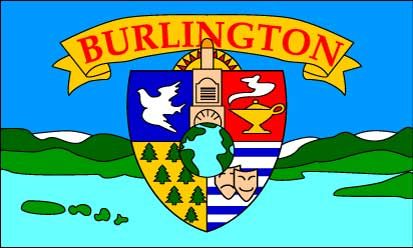
- March 4, 1997
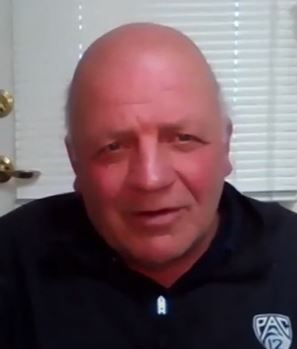

Nominee	Peter Clavelle	Louis Beaudin	Michael Brown
Party	Progressive Coalition	Independent	Independent
Popular vote	4,487	413	398
Percentage	76.13%	7.01%	6.75%
Mayor of Burlington before election
Peter Clavelle
Progressive Coalition
Elected Mayor of Burlington
Peter Clavelle
Progressive Coalition

On March 4, 1997, a mayoral election was held in Burlington, Vermont. Incumbent Progressive Coalition Mayor Peter Clavelle won reelection against three independent candidates.

== Background ==
Peter Brownell's victory in the 1993 election against Progressive Coalition Mayor Peter Clavelle was the first time a Republican had won Burlington's mayoralty since Edward A. Keenan left office in 1965, and ended the Progressive's control over the mayoralty which started with Bernie Sanders' victory in the 1981 election.

However, Clavelle returned to office and defeated Brownell in the 1995 election. By the time of the 1997 election, the city council was composed of 6 Progressives, 5 Republicans, 2 Democrats, and an independent.

== Nominations ==
Clavelle announced on December 2, 1996, that he would seek reelection and received the Progressive nomination without opposition on December 9.

The Democratic and Republican parties did not run candidates against Clavelle. John Patch, a Democratic candidate for city council, said the Democrats did not field a candidate as Clavelle "has been a pretty good Democrat". Kurt Wright declined to seek the Republican nomination.

== Campaign ==
Clavelle, lacking any major party opponents, used campaign money to hold a party attended by Progressive city councilors. Steve Hingtgen was Clavelle's campaign manager and expected to spend 1/4th of what Clavelle spent in 1995. He and Peter Baker were the only paid members of Clavelle's staff. The campaign focused on aiding Progressive city council candidates win.

Independent candidates Beaudin, Brown, and Capps were Clavelle's only opponents. Beaudin and Brown ran in the 1995 election as well. Brown spent $600 on a fundraising event in the Contois Auditorium in January 1997, but it was attended by nobody except one TV news reporter. Maja Capps did not raise any money as he was against the idea. Beaudin was vacationing in Florida until ten days before the election.

A mayoral forum sponsored by the Burlington Waterfront Board was held on February 19.

Clavelle won the election with over 70% of the popular vote. In the concurrent city council elections the Progressives maintained their seats while the Republicans lost one to the Democrats.

== Results ==
1997 Burlington, Vermont mayoral election
Party	Candidate	Votes	%
Progressive Coalition	Peter Clavelle (incumbent)	4,487	76.13%
Independent	Louis Beaudin	413	7.01%
Independent	Michael Brown	398	6.75%
Independent	Maja Capps	216	3.66%
Write-in		380	6.45%
Total votes		5,894	100.00%

== Works cited ==
=== Newspapers ===
- Corrigan, Hilary (December 10, 1996). "Progressives nominate Clavelle for mayor". The Burlington Free Press. p. 1B – via Newspapers.com.
- Geggis, Anne (February 8, 1997). "Burlington mayor spends campaign money on party". The Burlington Free Press. p. 3B – via Newspapers.com.
- Iyengar, Sona (March 6, 1997). "Clavelle thanks voters, sets goals". The Burlington Free Press. p. 3B – via Newspapers.com.
- Iyengar, Sona (December 3, 1996). "Clavelle to seek re-election". The Burlington Free Press. p. 1B – via Newspapers.com.
- Iyengar, Sona (March 5, 1997). "Democrats gain seat on council". The Burlington Free Press. p. 1B – via Newspapers.com.
- Iyengar, Sona (January 28, 1997). "Major parties avoid Clavelle challenge". The Burlington Free Press. p. 6B – via Newspapers.com.
- Iyengar, Sona (February 16, 1997). "Victory is brewing at Clavelle klatches". The Burlington Free Press. p. 1B – via Newspapers.com.
- Iyengar, Sona (January 3, 1997). "Wright won't run for mayor". The Burlington Free Press. p. 1B – via Newspapers.com.
- Teetor, Paul (March 3, 1993). "Brownell Wins". The Burlington Free Press. p. 1. Archived from the original on May 18, 2022 – via Newspapers.com.
- Walsh, Molly (February 25, 1997). "Democrats define agenda, hope to gain council seats". The Burlington Free Press. p. 1B – via Newspapers.com.
- Walsh, Molly (February 25, 1997). "DEMOCRATS: Party hopes to expand city influence". The Burlington Free Press. p. 5B – via Newspapers.com.

=== Report ===
- Statement of Votes Annual City Meeting (Report). Burlington, Vermont. March 7, 1995. p. 258.
