= 1999 Burlington, Vermont mayoral election =

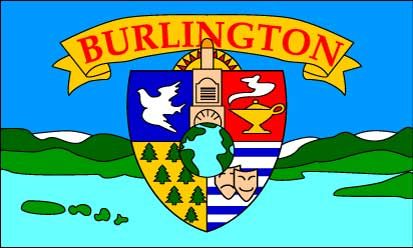
- March 2, 1999
- Turnout: 33%
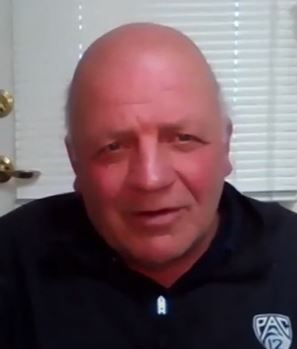

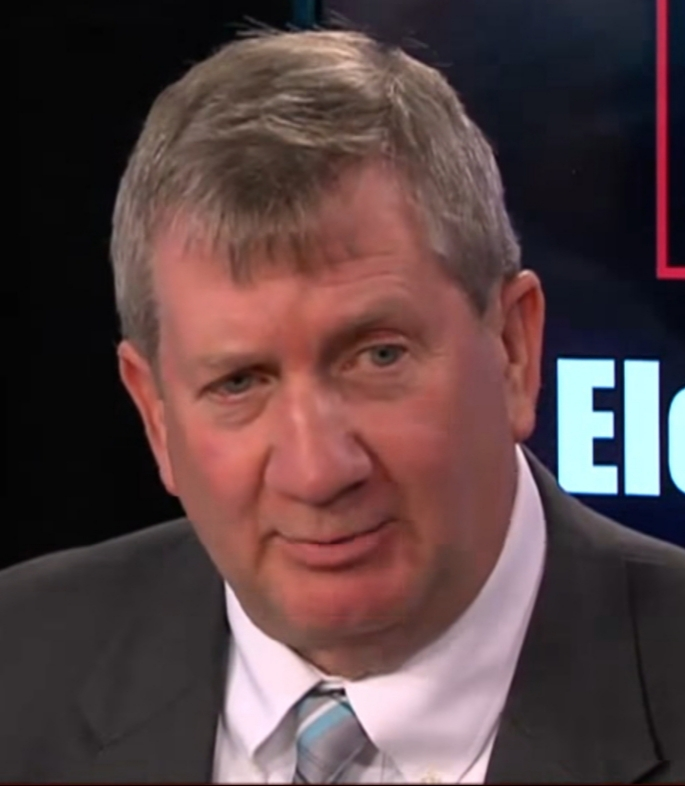
Nominee	Peter Clavelle	Kurt Wright
Party	Progressive Coalition	Republican
Popular vote	5,829	3,834
Percentage	58.69%	38.61%
Mayor of Burlington before election
Peter Clavelle
Progressive Coalition
Elected Mayor of Burlington
Peter Clavelle
Progressive Coalition

On March 2, 1999, a mayoral election was held in Burlington, Vermont. Incumbent Progressive Coalition Mayor Peter Clavelle defeated Republican nominee Kurt Wright.

== Background ==
Peter Clavelle lost reelection as mayor in 1993 to Republican nominee Peter Brownell, but returned to the office after he defeated Brownell in the 1995 election. The Progressives retained control over the city council during Clavelle's tenure.

On November 4, 1998, new campaign finance legislation went into effect. Candidates were now required to record the name, address, and town of residence for a contributor giving more than $100. The total number of contributions less than $100 was also required to be listed. The maximum donation allowed was lowered from $1,000 to $200, with the exception of family members.

== Nominations ==
=== Progressive ===
Clavelle announced that he would run for a fifth term on November 24, 1998. His campaign was managed by Peter Baker.

=== Republican ===
On December 14, 1998, Kurt Wright, a member of the city council, announced that he would run for mayor. John Barrows, a Democrat, managed Wright's campaign.

=== Other ===
Eric Brenner and John Pius Hogan ran as independent candidates. The signature requirement to run was raised from 30 to 150. Louie Beaudin and Michael Brown failed to turn in the required amount with Beaudin 75 short and Brown 34 short. Beaudin and Brown ran as write-in candidates instead.

== Campaign ==
Wright called for Clavelle to not collect absentee ballots and limit his campaign spending to $15,000. Wright had proposed legislation in 1996 to prohibit candidates and campaign workers from collecting and turning in absentee ballots, but the city council voted 9 to 3 against it. Clavelle rejected both of these demands and stated that he would spend $25,000. Clavelle raised $38,835 compared to Wright's $19,159 and Brenner's $32; Clavelle spent all but $1,000 of what he raised while Brenner spent $1,070.

The Republicans paid $1,200 in rent for their office space while the rent for Clavelle's headquarters was $400. Fred Osier, chair of the Republican Party in Burlington, accused Clavelle of benefitting from a special deal. Clavelle's campaign stated that it agreed to pay $800 for seven weeks of rent and had only paid $400 of it so far. Secretary of State Deborah Markowitz stated that the current campaign finance laws did not address rent payments.

Clavelle and Wright participated in a forum hosted by the Burlington Business Association on February 4. Brenner attended the forum as an audience member and criticize it for not including him and Hogan. Another forum with four candidates in attendance was held by the Neighborhood Planning Assemblies of wards 4 and 7 on February 17, while Beaudin and Brown were in the audience. A forum attended by Clavelle and Wright was hosted by City Women on February 24.

== Results ==
1999 Burlington, Vermont mayoral election
Party	Candidate	Votes	%	±%
Progressive Coalition	Peter Clavelle (incumbent)	5,829	58.69%	
Republican	Kurt Wright	3,834	38.61%	
Independent	Eric Brenner	227	2.29%	
Independent	John Pius Hogan	41	0.41%%	
Total votes		9,931	100.00%	

== Endorsements ==
List of Kurt Wright endorsements

Local officials

- Richard Bove, candidate in the 1981 mayoral election
List of Peter Clavelle endorsements

Federal officials

- Patrick Leahy, member of the United States Senate from Vermont (1975–2023)

Statewide officials

- Howard Dean, 79th Governor of Vermont (1991–2003) (Democratic)

Local officials

- Paul Lafayette, former member of the Burlington city council (Democratic)
- John Patch, former member of the Burlington city council and candidate for mayor in 1987 and 1995 (Democratic)

Organizations

- Burlington Police Association

== Works cited ==
=== Newspapers ===
- "Burlington". Rutland Herald. February 25, 1999. p. 12 – via Newspapers.com.
- "Clavelle: Mayor celebrates election victory". The Burlington Free Press. March 4, 1999. p. 3B – via Newspapers.com.
- "How Burlington voted". The Burlington Free Press. March 3, 1999. p. 2B – via Newspapers.com.
- "Mayor: Candidates already disagree". The Burlington Free Press. January 12, 1999. p. 3B – via Newspapers.com.
- "Two mayor candidates fail to make it on ballot". The Burlington Free Press. February 2, 1999. p. 3B – via Newspapers.com.
- "Voting practice under question". The Burlington Free Press. February 5, 1996. p. 1B – via Newspapers.com.
- Iyengar, Sona (March 5, 1997). "Democrats gain seat on council". The Burlington Free Press. p. 1B – via Newspapers.com.
- Teetor, Paul (March 3, 1993). "Brownell Wins". The Burlington Free Press. p. 1. Archived from the original on May 18, 2022 – via Newspapers.com.
- Walsh, Molly (February 25, 1997). "DEMOCRATS: Party hopes to expand city influence". The Burlington Free Press. p. 5B – via Newspapers.com.
- Wright, Leslie (February 7, 1999). "City candidates enter new finance world". The Burlington Free Press. p. 1B – via Newspapers.com.
- Wright, Leslie (February 21, 1999). "Clavelle gets union election endorsement of his own". The Burlington Free Press. p. 1B – via Newspapers.com.
- Wright, Leslie (February 27, 1999). "Clavelle's office rent raises political eyebrows". The Burlington Free Press. p. 3B – via Newspapers.com.
- Wright, Leslie (November 25, 1998). "Clavelle to seek fifth term". The Burlington Free Press. p. 1B – via Newspapers.com.
- Wright, Leslie (December 15, 1998). "Councilor to run for mayor". The Burlington Free Press. p. 1B – via Newspapers.com.
- Wright, Leslie (February 19, 1999). "Electric workers back Wright for mayor". The Burlington Free Press. p. 1B – via Newspapers.com.
- Wright, Leslie (March 16, 1999). "Mayor's campaign nets $38,835". The Burlington Free Press. p. 1B – via Newspapers.com.
- Wright, Leslie (February 5, 1999). "Mayor: Candidates meet at forum". The Burlington Free Press. p. 5B – via Newspapers.com.
- Wright, Leslie (February 18, 1999). "Mayor wins Dean's endorsement". The Burlington Free Press. p. 1A – via Newspapers.com.
- Wright, Leslie (February 18, 1999). "Mayoral candidates debate waterfront, salaries at forum". The Burlington Free Press. p. 1B – via Newspapers.com.
- Wright, Leslie (February 5, 1999). "Mayoral candidates meet". The Burlington Free Press. p. 1B – via Newspapers.com.
- Wright, Leslie (January 12, 1999). "Mayoral hopefuls already disagree". The Burlington Free Press. p. 1B – via Newspapers.com.
- Wright, Leslie (March 16, 1999). "Reports: Mayor raises $38,835". The Burlington Free Press. p. 3B – via Newspapers.com.
- Wright, Leslie (February 22, 1999). "Two independents also in mayoral race". The Burlington Free Press. p. 6A – via Newspapers.com.
- Wright, Leslie (February 25, 1999). "Women's Council shadows candidates". The Burlington Free Press. p. 1B – via Newspapers.com.

=== Report ===
- Statement of Votes Annual City Meeting (Report). Burlington, Vermont. March 7, 1995. p. 258.
