= 1993 Burlington, Vermont mayoral election =

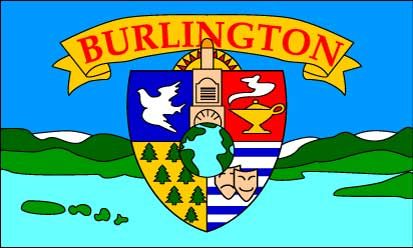
- March 2, 1993

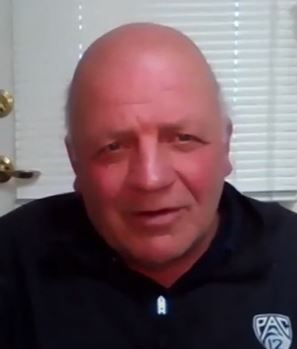
| Nominee | Peter Brownell | Peter Clavelle |
| Party | Republican | Progressive Coalition |
| Popular vote | 5,410 | 4,686 |
| Percentage | 52.48% | 45.46% |
- Results by city council district Brownell: Brownell—50–60% Brownell—60–70% Clavelle: Clavelle—50–60% Clavelle—60–70%
Mayor of Burlington before election
Peter Clavelle
Progressive Coalition
Elected Mayor of Burlington
Peter Brownell
Republican

The 1993 Burlington, Vermont mayoral election was held on March 2, 1993. Republican nominee Peter Brownell defeated incumbent Progressive Coalition Mayor Peter Clavelle.

Clavelle won renomination as the Progressive Coalition's candidate. The Republican Party, which had not run a candidate since the 1983 mayoral election, gave its nomination to Brownell, a member of the city council from the 6th district. The Democratic Party opted to not run or endorse a candidate. Brownell defeated Clavelle despite Clavelle's advantage in funds raised, endorsements, and two hundred more volunteers working on his campaign. Clavelle stated that he had lost the election for passing legislation to make Burlington residents pay for the health care benefits for city workers' domestic partners.

This was the first time since the election of Bernie Sanders in 1981 that somebody not aligned with the Progressive Coalition won election to the mayoralty. Brownell was the first Republican to hold the office of mayor since Edward A. Keenan left office in 1965. This election is the most recent time a Republican won election to the mayoralty of Burlington.

== Background ==
Bernie Sanders won election as Mayor of Burlington, Vermont, in the 1981 mayoral election as an independent. He won reelection in the 1983, 1985, and 1987 elections. During Sanders' mayoralty the composition of the thirteen-member city council changed from having ten Democratic members and three Republicans after the 1980 election to the pro-Sanders Progressive Coalition holding six of the seats after the 1987 election.

Peter Clavelle won the 1989 mayoral election as an independent candidate with the support of the Progressive Coalition. He won reelection in the 1991 election as the nominee of the Progressive Coalition and faced no opposition from the Democratic and Republican parties. The Progressive Coalition won six seats on the city council in the 1992 election, which was the highest amount they had held since 1989, while the Democrats won five seats, and the Republicans won two seats.

Dianne Deforge, a member of the city council from the 4th district who considered running for mayor in 1993, stated that the Republicans and Democrats would run a candidate against Clavelle in the 1993 election unlike in the 1991 election. She stated that "Clavelle won't get a free ride this time". However, she stated that a Democrat was more likely to win and that it was "not the year for a Republican to run citywide".

== Campaign ==
=== Candidates ===
==== Progressive Coalition ====
On December 9, 1992, the Progressive Coalition voted to give its nomination to Peter Clavelle. Clavelle announced that he would seek reelection to a third term on January 21, 1993.

==== Republican ====
The Republican Party had not ran a candidate in the 1985, 1987, 1989, and 1991 elections. Peter Brownell, a member of the city council from the 6th district, stated that the possible candidates for the Republican nomination were him and Bob Minkewicz, the chair of the Burlington Republican Party. Brownell announced on January 14, 1993, that he would run for the Republican nomination and won the nomination on January 20.

Brownell selected Jill McDermott to serve as his campaign manager. McDermott had previously worked as the campaign manager for Lieutenant Governor Peter Plympton Smith and Governor Richard A. Snelling.

==== Democratic ====
The Democratic Party had not ran a candidate in the 1991 election. William Aswad, a member of the city council who had run for the Democratic mayoral nomination in 1989, considered running, but declined. Paul Lafayette, who was the Democratic mayoral nominee in 1987, was considered the strongest candidate, but declined to run to instead focus on his painting business. Randy Amis considered running, but declined to instead focus on his law career.

The Democrats did not nominate a candidate for the election and did not endorse a candidate. Clavelle, Brownell, and Prim were nominated for the endorsement, but Prim received zero votes, Calvelle received one vote, Brownell received seven votes, and the remainder voted for none of the above. Aswad endorsed Brownell while city councilor Maurice Mahoney stated that he would vote for Brownell, but not endorse him.

==== Other ====
Paul Cook, Roger Verville, Don Prim, Matthew Gardy, and Eddie Bickford all petitioned to run in the mayoral election as independent candidates. Gardy and Verville withdrew from the race and gave their support to Brownell.

=== General election ===
The candidates participated in one candidate forum and two debates. The Burlington Police Association chose to endorse Brownell, which was the first time since 1981 that the union did not support the Progressive nominee. During the campaign Clavelle outspent and outraised Brownell with Clavelle having raised $26,872, spent $25,545, and had a remaining debt of $3,862 while Brownell raised $17,349 and spent $12,317. Clavelle had 220 volunteers working for his campaign compared to Brownell's 20 volunteers.

Brownell defeated Clavelle in the election while only winning two of the city council wards. Brownell's victory ended the Progressive Coalition's control of the mayoral office that it had held since the 1981 election and he became the first Republican to hold the office since Edward A. Keenan left office in 1965. Clavelle stated that he had lost due to him passing legislation to have Burlington pay for the health care benefits for domestic partners of city workers.

Former Republican Mayor Robert K. Bing was happy with Brownell's victory while United States Representative Bernie Sanders, who served as mayor from 1981 to 1989, stated that he was disappointed by Clavelle's defeat. As of 2018, Brownell's victory in the 1993 election is the most recent time the Republicans have won election as mayor of Burlington.

The Republicans gained one seat on the city council from the Democrats while the Progressives retained all of their seats. A special election was held on to fill the vacancy on the city council from the 4th district created by Brownell becoming mayor which was won by Republican nominee Tom Ryan.

== Polling ==
| Poll source | Date(s) | Sample size | Margin of Error | Clavelle | Brownell | Undecided | Other |
| Macro International-Free Press | February 21, 1993 | 411 likely voters | ± 4.5% | 45.00%' | 28.00% | 24.00% | 3.00% |

== Results ==
1993 Burlington, Vermont mayoral election
| Party | Candidate | Votes | % | ±% |
|---|---|---|---|---|
| Republican | Peter Brownell | 5,410 | 52.48% | +52.48% |
| Progressive Coalition | Peter Clavelle (incumbent) | 4,686 | 45.46% | −32.50% |
| Independent | Donald L. Prim | 98 | 0.95% | +0.95% |
| Independent | Paul A. Cook | 45 | 0.44% | +0.44% |
| Independent | Edwards Bickford | 39 | 0.38% | +0.38% |
| Independent | Roger R. Verville | 16 | 0.16% | +0.16% |
| Independent | Matthew Peter Gardy | 14 | 0.14% | +0.14% |
| Total votes | | 10,308 | 100.00% | |

=== Results by ward ===
| Ward | Brownell | Votes | Clavelle | Votes | Prim | Votes | Cook | Votes | Bickford | Votes | Verville | Votes | Gardy | Votes | Total votes | Votes |
|---|---|---|---|---|---|---|---|---|---|---|---|---|---|---|---|---|
| Ward 1 | 37.93% | 479 | 60.57% | 765 | 0.55% | 7 | 0.16% | 2 | 0.40% | 5 | 0.24% | 3 | 0.16% | 2 | 100.00% | 1,263 |
| Ward 2 | 36.07% | 356 | 61.09% | 603 | 0.81% | 8 | 1.11% | 11 | 0.61% | 6 | 0.20% | 2 | 0.10% | 1 | 100.00% | 987 |
| Ward 3 | 40.46% | 511 | 57.09% | 721 | 1.03% | 13 | 0.40% | 5 | 0.87% | 11 | 0.08% | 1 | 0.08% | 1 | 100.00% | 1,263 |
| Ward 4 | 66.60% | 2,415 | 31.14% | 1,129 | 1.41% | 51 | 0.50% | 18 | 0.22% | 8 | 0.03% | 1 | 0.11% | 4 | 100.00% | 3,626 |
| Ward 5 | 55.83% | 981 | 42.57% | 748 | 0.51% | 9 | 0.34% | 6 | 0.28% | 5 | 0.23% | 4 | 0.23% | 4 | 100.00% | 1,757 |
| Ward 6 | 47.31% | 668 | 50.99% | 720 | 0.71% | 10 | 0.21% | 3 | 0.28% | 4 | 0.35% | 5 | 0.14% | 2 | 100.00% | 1,412 |

== Endorsements ==
Brownell endorsements

Local officials

- Bill Aswad, member and president of the Burlington, Vermont city council

Organizations

- Burlington Police Association
Clavelle endorsements

Federal officials

- Bernie Sanders, member of the United States House of Representatives from Vermont's at-large congressional district (1991–2007)

Statewide officials

- Ed Flanagan, Vermont Auditor of Accounts (1993–2001)
- Joan Hoff, former chair of the Vermont State Board of Education
- Philip H. Hoff, 73rd Governor of Vermont (1963–1969)

State legislators

- Jean Ankeney, member of the Vermont Senate
- Sandra Baird, member of the Vermont House of Representatives
- Terry Bouricius, member of the Vermont House of Representatives
- Alice Cook Bassett, former member of the Vermont House of Representatives
- Sally Conrad, former member of the Vermont Senate
- Dean Corren, member of the Vermont House of Representatives
- Tom Fleury, member of the Vermont House of Representatives
- Althea Kroger, member of the Vermont Senate
- Douglas McSweeney, former member of the Vermont Senate
- Doug Racine, former president of the Vermont Senate
- Tom Smith, member of the Vermont House of Representatives
- Mary Sullivan, member of the Vermont House of Representatives
- Peter Welch, member of the Vermont Senate
- David Wolk, former member of the Vermont Senate

Local officials

- John Barrows, member of the Burlington, Vermont school board
- Herb Bloomenthal, former chair of the Burlington, Vermont school board
- Francis J. Cain, 35th Mayor of Burlington, Vermont (1965–1971)
- Don Dickson, member of the Burlington, Vermont school board
- Phi Doane, former member of the Burlington, Vermont school board
- John Leddy, former member of the Burlington, Vermont city council
- Bob Sweeney, former member of the Burlington, Vermont city council

Individuals

- Terje Anderson, former member of the Democratic National Committee
- David Curtis, former chair of the Burlington Democratic Party
- Craig Fuller, former executive director of the Vermont Democratic Party
- Caryl Stewart, former chair of the Burlington Democratic Party

Newspapers

- The Burlington Free Press
- Vermont Times
