= Peter Brownell =

American politician (born 1948)

Member of the Vermont State Senate from Chittenden County
- In office 1997–2001
- Preceded by: Multi-member district
- Succeeded by: Multi-member district

39th Mayor of Burlington, Vermont
- In office April 5, 1993 – April 3, 1995
- Preceded by: Peter Clavelle
- Succeeded by: Peter Clavelle

Member of the Burlington, Vermont Board of Aldermen from the 4th district
- In office December 11, 1989 – April 4, 1993
- Preceded by: David Thelander
- Succeeded by: Tom Ryan

Member of the Burlington, Vermont Board of School Commissioners from the 6th district
- In office 1983–1985
- Preceded by: Diane Gallagher
- Succeeded by: Elizabeth Van Buren
- In office 1986–1988

Personal details
- Born: 1948 (age 77–78) New York City, U.S.
- Party: Republican
- Spouse(s): Christina Bratton; Linda B. Anderson
- Children: 5
- Relatives: Chauncey W. Brownell (great-grandfather)
- Education: University of Pennsylvania; University of Vermont

Military service
- Allegiance: United States
- Branch/service: United States Air Force
- Years of service: 1972-1978

Peter C. Brownell (born 1948) is an American politician who served as the 39th mayor of Burlington, Vermont. Prior to his tenure as mayor he was active in local politics, serving on the school board and the city council. After his tenure as mayor he served in the Vermont Senate. He is the most recent Republican elected as mayor of Burlington.

Brownell was born in New York City, and was educated at Choate Rosemary Hall, the University of Pennsylvania, and the University of Vermont. After serving in the United States Air Force he moved to Burlington, Vermont, where he entered politics. He was elected to the city's school board in 1983, and again in 1986. Brownell was elected to the city council in a 1989 special election and reelected in the 1990 and 1992 elections.

Brownell ran in the 1993 Burlington mayoral election against incumbent Progressive Coalition Mayor Peter Clavelle despite Clavelle's fundraising and campaign volunteer advantage. His victory was the first time a Republican won the mayoralty since Edward A. Keenan in 1965. Brownell lost reelection to Clavelle in 1995. He was elected to the state senate in the 1996 election and reelected in 1998, but lost renomination in 2000.

== Early life and education ==
Brownell was born in New York City in 1948, to Mary Hester Gaskill and Lincoln C. Brownell. Chauncey W. Brownell, his great-grandfather, served as Secretary of State of Vermont and in the Vermont Senate. During his childhood he traveled between Long Island, New York, and Saigon, South Vietnam, due to his father's business.

Brownell graduated from Choate Rosemary Hall. He married Christina Bratton, who he met while at the University of Pennsylvania, in Maryland in 1969. In 1970, he graduated from the University of Pennsylvania with a bachelor's degree in sociology, after having originally majored in chemical engineering, and graduated from the University of Vermont with a master's degree in business administration in 1978. He served in the United States Air Force for six years. He moved his family to Burlington, Vermont, in 1978. Brownell worked as a financial analyst for General Electric for fifteen years. He attempted to gain a job on the Burlington police or airport commissions, but he was rejected every time.

== Career ==
=== School board ===
In 1983, Diana Gallagher, a member of the school board, ran for a seat on the city council from the 6th district. Brownell won the Republican nomination to succeed her on the school board from the 6th district by a unanimous vote and defeated independent Hans J. Puck in the general election. He did not seek reelection as he wanted to spend more time with his family in 1985, and Elizabeth Van Buren, a member of the Democratic Party, was unopposed to succeed him. Brownell won the Republican nomination to run for the school board from the 6th district in 1986, and won in the general election without opposition. He did not run for reelection in 1988.

During Brownell's tenure on the board he served as chair of the Finance Committee and consider running for chair of the board in 1986, but he did not have enough support.

=== City council ===
In 1989, David Thelander, a Republican member of the city council, resigned to work in Washington, D.C. for the U.S. Securities and Exchange Commission. Brownell received the Republican nomination and defeated Democratic and Progressive Coalition nominee Greg Guma in the special election. During the campaign Brownell raised $2,170 and spent $472 while Guma raised $875 and spent $640.

Brownell defeated Green Party nominee Bea Bookchin in 1990, and faced no opposition in 1992. After Brownell was elected as mayor he resigned from the city council. A special election was held to fill the vacancy and it was won by Republican nominee Tom Ryan.

During his tenure on the city council Brownell served on the Finance committee. Following the resignation of Jane Watson, a member of the city council from the 5th district, Brownell became interested in running for chair of the city council as Watson's resignation left the Democrats without enough votes, but Brownell later declined to run.

=== Mayoralty ===
==== Elections ====
The Vermont Republican Party did not nominate a candidate in the 1985, 1987, 1989, and 1991 mayoral elections. Brownell announced on January 14, 1993, that he would run for the Republican nomination and won the nomination on January 20. Brownell defeated Clavelle in the election while only winning two of the city council wards despite Clavelle having outraised Brownell and Clavelle having 220 volunteers compared to Brownell's 20. Brownell's victory ended the Progressive Coalition's control of the mayoral office that it held since the 1981 election and he became the first Republican to hold the office since Edward A. Keenan left office in 1965. Clavelle stated that he lost due to him passing legislation to have Burlington pay for the health care benefits for domestic partners of city workers. Brownell's victory in the 1993 election is the most recent time the Republicans have won election as mayor of Burlington as of 2018.

Brownell announced on January 9, 1995, that he would seek reelection for another term. However, he was defeated in the general election by Clavelle. During the campaign Clavelle raised $41,020 and spent $40,644, Brownell raised $22,263 and spent $16,527, and Paul Lafayette raised $16,152 and spent $16,040.

==== Tenure ====
Composition of the Burlington city council after the 1994 elections with three of the independent members caucusing with the Progressives.

In 1993, Brownell made multiple appointments which were illegal under a rarely enforced section of Burlington's city charter which required all officials appointed by the mayor to be voters in Burlington. The city council voted to approve his nominations despite complaints from councilor Maurice Mahoney.

During Brownell's tenure as mayor he made multiple trips to Montpelier to lobby for a $63.9 million capital construction bill, which included $1.3 million to buy twenty-five acres of waterfront on Lake Champlain from a land trust. The city borrowed $1.2 million from the retirement fund to develop the waterfront which made the city pay $120,000 in interest per year. Brownell proposed leasing three to five acres of the waterfront to pay back the debt.

Brownell's 1993 budget reduced the city's budget by $1 million, eliminated 10 positions in the city government, and reduced all general fund operating budgets while increasing property taxes by 2.8%. The budget was approved by the city council by a vote of 7 to 6. Brownell proposed merging the police and fire departments in 1994, but the city council voted 12 to 2 against the measure.

On September 27, 1993, the city council voted 7 to 4 in favor of passing legislation to create a new tax to pay for a citywide recycling program. All three Republican members of the city council and Democratic member Bill Aswad voted against the tax and Brownell conducted his first veto in office against the legislation. However, the city council voted to overturn his veto on October 12, with only the Republican members voting to sustain his veto; Aswad was not present.

In the 1993 election the Republicans gained one seat on the city council from the Democrats while the Progressives retained all of their seats bringing the composition of the city council to four Progressive Coalition members, four Democratic members, three Republican members, and two independents. The Republicans lost one seat on the city council in the 1994 election while the Progressive Coalition gained control over the council by expanding their seat total to eight including three independents caucusing with them. During the 1994 elections there were two ballot initiatives to increase taxes, one was a $3.5 tax increase and another was a $1.26 school tax increase, and Brownell supported both ballot measures, but both were defeated in the election. The Republicans gained two seats in the 1995 election.

=== Vermont Senate ===
==== Elections ====
In 1991, Brownell considered running for a seat in the Vermont House of Representatives to succeed Helen Riehle. After losing the mayoral election Brownell considered either running for a seat in the Vermont Senate or running for mayor again in the 1997 election. On July 11, 1996, he announced that he would run for one of six seats in the state senate from Chittenden County. Brownell placed second out of eight candidates in the Republican primary and fourth out of twelve candidates in the general election. Brownell spent $11,039 during the campaign.

Brownell ran for reelection in the 1998 election, placed first out of six candidates in the Republican primary, and placed fourth out of fourteen candidates in the general election. Brownell spent $9,051 during the campaign.

During the 2000 election Brownell and other state senators were targeted by Reverend David Stertzbach, an anti-gay pastor, due to Brownell's support for civil unions. Brownell lost renomination in the Republican primary after placing last and it was stated that his defeat was caused by Stertzbach. Representatives John Edwards, Marion Milne, William Fyfe, and Robert Kinsey, who also supported civil unions, lost renomination as well. He chose to not run in the general election as an independent candidate.

==== Tenure ====
Brownell endorsed John Carroll for the Republican nomination for lieutenant governor during the 1996 election. During his tenure in the state senate Brownell served on the General Affairs and Housing, and Education committees. Brownell considered running for a seat in the United States House of Representatives from Vermont's at-large congressional district in the 2000 election. During the 2000 presidential election Brownell supported U.S. Senator John McCain for the Republican nomination and served as McCain's campaign manager in Vermont.

== Later life ==
Brownell's wife Christina Bratton served as chair of the Voter Registration Board for three months in 1996, until she was replaced by Kathleen Butler, a member of the Progressive Coalition. Bratton stated that she was removed as chair for political reason while Butler stated that Brownell's election as chair was only due to several members being absent. Kurt Wright, a member of the city council, proposed a resolution to call her removal "an extraordinary and high unusual vote", but it failed by a 7 to 6 vote. Bratton also served as treasurer of the Burlington Republican Party.

Brownell married Linda B. Anderson on July 8, 2000. Brownell was selected to serve as director of administration for the Vermont State Board of Education in 2001. He declined to run for the Republican nomination for lieutenant governor in the 2002 election.

== Political positions ==
In 1990, the Burlington city council voted to end the city's advertising in The Burlington Free Press after the newspaper ended negotiations with its union workers. Brownell voted against ending advertisement in the newspapers stating that it was government intrusion into a private business. He supports abortion rights.

The Burlington city council passed a resolution opposing military action against Iraq and calling for President George H. W. Bush to find avoid military action in the defense of the Gulf countries against Iraq; Brownell voted against this resolution. The city council later passed a resolution sponsored by Brownell which praised Bush and gave support to the United States' soldiers in Saudi Arabia. In 1992, Brownell voted against making Arad, Israel, and Bethlehem sister cities of Burlington stating that he believes that it was "beyond the scope of what a small city should do".

Bronwell supported school choice and was a member of the Vermonters for Educational Choice committee. Brownell and Senator Nancy Chard considered redistricting Vermont's school districts to decrease them from sixty-two to fourteen, which would have been one per county.

The state senate voted 17 to 13, with Brownell opposing, against legislation to amend the Constitution of Vermont to only allow marriages between one man and one woman. The state senate voted 21 to 9, with Brownell against, against amending the Vermont Constitution to overturn a ruling by the Vermont Supreme Court giving same-sex couples the rights and benefits of marriage. The state senate voted 19 to 11, with Brownell in favor, in favor of allowing civil unions for same-sex couples.

== Electoral history ==
1983 Burlington, Vermont School Board Commission 6th district election
Party	Candidate	Votes	%
Republican	Peter Brownell	1,188	57.92%
Independent	Hans J. Puck	863	42.08%
Total votes		2,051	100.00%

1989 Burlington, Vermont city council 6th district special election
Party	Candidate	Votes	%
Republican	Peter Brownell	635	69.25%
Progressive Coalition	Greg Guma		
Democratic	Greg Guma		
Total	Greg Guma	282	30.75%
Total votes		917	100.00%

1990 Burlington, Vermont city council 6th district election
Party	Candidate	Votes	%	±%
Republican	Peter Brownell (incumbent)	704	73.18%	+15.26%
Green	Bea Bookchin	258	26.82%	+26.82%
Total votes		962	100.00%	

1992 Burlington, Vermont city council 6th district election
Party	Candidate	Votes	%	±%
Republican	Peter Brownell (incumbent)	693	100.00%	+26.82%
Total votes		693	100.00%	

1996 Chittenden County Vermont Senate Republican primary
Party	Candidate	Votes	%
Republican	Barbara Snelling	4,483	17.04%
Republican	Peter Brownell	4,396	16.71%
Republican	Helen Riehle	3,385	12.87%
Republican	Tut Parmly	3,029	11.52%
Republican	Joe Zagursky	2,975	11.31%
Republican	Kurt Wright	2,955	11.23%
Republican	Mike McHugh	2,561	9.74%
Republican	Denny Morrisseau	2,519	9.58%
Total votes		26,303	100.00%

1996 Chittenden County Vermont Senate election
Party	Candidate	Votes	%
Republican	Barbara Snelling	30,440	11.21%
Democratic	Jan Backus	27,190	10.01%
Democratic	Jack Barry	27,045	9.96%
Republican	Peter Brownell	26,741	9.85%
Democratic	Jean Ankeney	24,527	9.03%
Republican	Helen Riehle	22,763	8.38%
Democratic	Jane Munt	22,059	8.12%
Democratic	David Curtis	20,515	7.56%
Democratic	Johannah Leddy Donovan	20,037	7.38%
Republican	Kurt Wright	19,621	7.23%
Republican	Tut Parmly	15,471	5.70%
Republican	Joe Zagursky	14,697	5.41%
Write-in		428	0.16%
Total votes		271,534	100.00%

1998 Chittenden County Vermont Senate Republican primary
Party	Candidate	Votes	%	±%
Republican	Peter Brownell (incumbent)	6,334	22.50%	+5.79%
Republican	Helen Riehle (incumbent)	5,720	20.31%	+7.44%
Republican	J. Dennis Delaney	5,682	20.18%	+20.18%
Republican	Susan W. Sweetser	5,511	19.57%	+19.57%
Republican	Dawn Hill-Fleury	4,766	16.93%	+16.93%
Republican	Matt Gardy	144	0.51%	+0.51%
Total votes		28,157	100.00%	

1998 Chittenden County Vermont Senate election
Party	Candidate	Votes	%	±%
Democratic	James P. Leddy	23,956	10.41%	+10.41
Democratic	Jan Backus (incumbent)	23,102	10.04%	+0.03%
Republican	Helen Riehle (incumbent)	23,051	10.02%	+1.64%
Republican	Peter Brownell (incumbent)	22,712	9.87%	+0.02%
Democratic	Jean Ankeney (incumbent)	21,438	9.32%	+0.29%
Democratic	Jane Munt	20,791	9.04%	+0.92%
Republican	Susan W. Sweetser	19,842	8.62%	+8.62%
Republican	J. Dennis Delaney	19,726	8.57%	+8.57%
Republican	Matt Gardy	13,363	5.81%	+5.81%
Democratic	Timothy J. Palmer	13,015	5.66%	+5.66%
Democratic	Bruce D. Cunningham	12,615	5.48%	+5.48%
Republican	Dawn Hill-Fleury	11,557	5.02%	+5.02%
Libertarian	Stephen Pollak	2,352	1.02%	+1.02%
Libertarian	Brendan Kinney	2,175	0.95%	+0.95%
Write-in		385	0.17%	+0.01%
Total votes		230,079	100.00%	

2000 Chittenden County Vermont Senate Republican primary
Party	Candidate	Votes	%	±%
Republican	Rodolphe M. Vallee	10,355	15.33%	+15.33%
Republican	Donald R. Brunelle	8,882	13.15%	+13.15%
Republican	William L. Parkinson	8,345	12.36%	+12.36%
Republican	Leigh E. Pfenning	8,271	12.25%	+12.25%
Republican	Tut Parmly	8,143	12.06%	+12.06%
Republican	Barbara Snelling	8,086	11.97%	+11.97%
Republican	Gavin T. Mills	7,735	11.45%	+11.45%
Republican	Peter Brownell (incumbent)	7,720	11.43%	−11.07%
Total votes		67,537	100.00%	
