= 1995 Burlington, Vermont mayoral election =

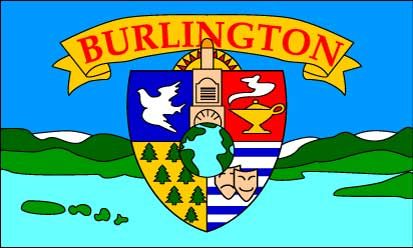
- March 7, 1995
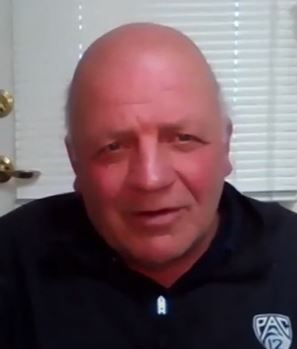

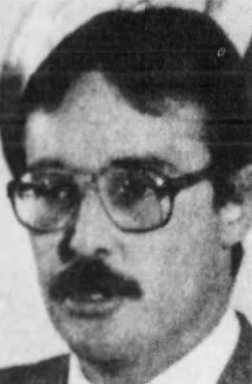
Nominee	Peter Clavelle	Peter Brownell	Paul Lafayette
Party	Progressive Coalition	Republican	Democratic
Popular vote	5,055	4,815	1,793
Percentage	43.00%	40.96%	15.25%
- Results by city council district Clavelle: Clavelle—60–70% Clavelle—50–60% Clavelle—40–50% Brownell: Brownell—50–60% Brownell—40–50%
Mayor of Burlington before election
Peter Brownell
Republican
Elected Mayor of Burlington
Peter Clavelle
Progressive Coalition

On March 7, 1995 a mayoral election was held in Burlington, Vermont, United States. Progressive Coalition nominee Peter Clavelle, the former mayor who had lost reelection in the 1993 election, defeated incumbent Republican Mayor Peter Brownell, Democratic nominee Paul Lafayette, and other candidates.

Brownell ended the Progressive's control over the mayoralty with his victory in the 1993 election, but during his tenure the Progressives gained control over the city council. Michael Monte and Sharon Bushor, independent members of the city council, considered running for the mayoralty with the Progressive nomination, but declined after Clavelle announced his campaign. Lafayette, the Democratic mayoral nominee from the 1987 election, ran in the election.

Clavelle won in the election with a plurality of the vote after outspending Brownell and Lafayette. His victory was attributed to Brownell and Lafayette splitting the vote and his campaign organization. He was the first mayor since James Edmund Burke in the 1933 election to return to the position after losing reelection. Brownell is the most recent Republican to have served as mayor of Burlington.

== Background ==
Peter Brownell's victory in the 1993 election against Progressive Coalition Mayor Peter Clavelle was the first time a Republican had won Burlington's mayoralty since Edward A. Keenan left office in 1965, and ended the Progressive's control over the mayoralty which started with Bernie Sanders' victory in the 1981 election.

The Progressive Coalition gained control of the city council after the 1994 election after gaining two seats and having three independent members caucus with them. During the 1994 elections there were two ballot initiatives to increase taxes, one was a $3.5 tax increase and another was a $1.26 school tax increase, and Brownell supported both ballot measures, but both were defeated in the election.

== Campaign ==
=== Candidates ===
==== Democratic ====
Paul Lafayette, a Democratic member of the city council who ran in the 1987 election, announced that he would run for the Democratic mayoral nomination on November 17, 1994, and formally launched his campaign on January 3, 1995. The Democrats gave Lafayette at their caucus on January 12, after former Governor Philip H. Hoff nominated him.

==== Progressive Coalition ====
Clavelle announced on November 17, 1994, that he would seek the Progressive Coalition's mayoral nomination. Michael Monte, an independent member of the city council, announced on November 21, that he would not run in the mayoral election and would instead support Clavelle stating that he "only considered running for mayor if Peter Clavelle didn't throw his hat in the ring". Sharon Bushor, another independent member of the city council, announced on November 23, that she would not run for the Progressive Coalition's nomination and gave her support to Clavelle. Clavelle received the Progressive Coalition's nomination at its caucus on November 29, after being nominated by Bushor and formally launched his campaign on January 7, 1995.

==== Republican ====
Brownell announced that he would seek reelection on January 9, 1995, and was given the Republican nomination at the party's caucus on January 18, after being nominated by Sara Gear, a member of the Vermont Senate.

==== Other ====
Haik Bedrosian, who ran in the 1991 election, announced that he would run for mayor as an independent on November 23, 1994. However, he dropped out and ran to succeed Brian Pine, a Progressive Coalition member of the city council, who was retiring due to the upcoming birth of his first child. Bedrosian defeated Democratic nominee John Patch in the election. Michael Brown ran as an independent and Louis Beaudin ran under the A Concerned Voter ballot line. Paul Cook, who previously ran for mayor in the 1993 election, ran on the People for Effective Efficient Government ballot line, but dropped out and endorsed Clavelle although Cook remained on the ballot as they were already printed.

=== General election ===
There was a public forum held by the Downtown Burlington Development Association and attended by Brownell, Clavelle, and Lafayette. During the forum Beaudin took control of the microphone to complain about the exclusion of other mayoral candidates from the forum. Another forum was held by the Ward 4 and 7 Neighborhood Planning Assembly with all of the mayoral candidates in attendance. There were three debates held during the campaign.

During the campaign Clavelle had raised $41,020 and spent $40,644, Brownell raised $22,263 and spent $16,527, and Paul Lafayette raised $16,152 and spent $16,040. 1,166 people donated to Clavelle's campaign, 283 to Brownell's campaign, and 200 to Lafayette's campaign. Lafayette received an $1,000 donation from Alan Bjerke, a member of the Vermont House of Representatives, and a $425 donation from Hoff. During the 1993 campaign Clavelle had 220 volunteers working on his campaign while during the 1995 campaign he had over 300 volunteers.

Clavelle won the election and placed first in four wards while Brownell placed first in three wards. Clavelle received more than the forty percent of the popular vote required to avoid a runoff election. The composition of the city council changed from five Progressives, four Democrats, three independents, and two Republicans to five Progressives, four Republicans, three independents, and two Democrats after the election. Clavelle was the first mayor of Burlington since James Edmund Burke in the 1933 election to return to the position after losing reelection. Brownell is the most recent Republican to have served as mayor of Burlington.

Lafayette stated on March 3, that his supporters were tactical voting for either Brownell or Clavelle and not for him as they were afraid of splitting the vote and allowing the candidate they liked less to win. Garrison Nelson, a political science professor at the University of Vermont, stated that Clavelle won due to his campaign organization and Lafayette splitting Brownell's vote.

== Results ==
1995 Burlington, Vermont mayoral election
Party	Candidate	Votes	%	±%
Progressive Coalition	Peter Clavelle	5,055	43.00%	−2.46%
Republican	Peter Brownell (incumbent)	4,815	40.96%	−11.52%
Democratic	Paul Lafayette	1,793	15.25%	+15.25%
Independent	Michael Brown	42	0.36%	+0.36%
A Concerned Voter	Louis Beaudin	37	0.31%	+0.31%
People for Effective Efficient Government	Paul A. Cook	14	0.12%	−0.32%
Total votes		11,756	100.00%	

=== Results by ward ===
Ward	Clavelle	Votes	Brownell	Votes	Lafayette	Votes	Brown	Votes	Beaudin	Votes	Cook	Votes	Total votes	Votes
Ward 1	54.86%	768	33.57%	470	10.93%	153	0.07%	1	0.57%	8	0.00%	0	100.00%	1,400
Ward 2	63.98%	698	20.99%	229	13.20%	144	1.37%	15	0.37%	4	0.09%	1	100.00%	1,091
Ward 3	57.44%	830	24.64%	356	16.96%	245	0.55%	8	0.07%	1	0.35%	5	100.00%	1,445
Ward 4	29.00%	645	56.29%	1,252	14.16%	315	0.09%	2	0.31%	7	0.13%	3	100.00%	2,224
Ward 5	38.07%	747	42.97%	843	18.30%	359	0.36%	7	0.31%	6	0.00%	0	100.00%	1,962
Ward 6	47.76%	799	41.54%	695	9.98%	167	0.18%	3	0.36%	6	0.18%	3	100.00%	1,673
Ward 7	28.96%	568	49.46%	970	20.91%	410	0.31%	6	0.25%	5	0.10%	2	100.00%	1,961

== Endorsements ==
Brownell endorsements

Newspapers

- The Burlington Free Press
Clavelle endorsements

Federal officials

- Bernie Sanders, member of the United States House of Representatives from Vermont's at-large congressional district

Local officials

- Matha Abbott, member of the Burlington, Vermont city council
- Sharon Bushor, member of the Burlington, Vermont city council
- Michael Monte, member of the Burlington, Vermont city council

Organizations

- Burlington Police Association
- Champlain Valley Labor Council, coalition of AFL–CIO affiliated unions

Notable individuals

- Paul Cook, mayoral candidate
