= 1991 Burlington, Vermont mayoral election =

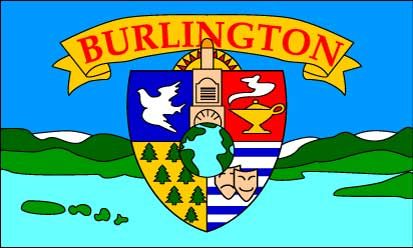
- March 3, 1991
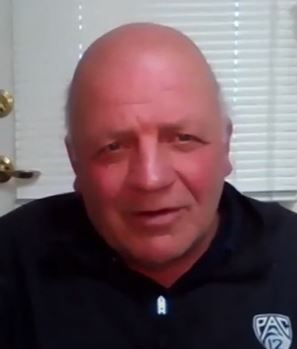

Nominee	Peter Clavelle	Haik Bedrosian	Daniel Gregory
Party	Progressive Coalition	Independent	Independent
Popular vote	6,162	865	522
Percentage	77.96%	10.94%	6.60%
- Results by city council district Clavelle: Clavelle: 70–80% Clavelle: 80–90%
Mayor of Burlington before election
Peter Clavelle
Independent
Elected Mayor of Burlington
Peter Clavelle
Progressive Coalition

The 1991 Burlington, Vermont mayoral election was held on March 3, 1991 to elect the mayor of Burlington, Vermont. Incumbent independent Mayor Peter Clavelle ran as the candidate of the Progressive Coalition, and defeated Haik Bedrosian, Daniel Gregory, and Michael Hackett, who all ran as independent candidates. The Democratic and Republican parties did not run candidates in this election.

Clavelle faced no opposition for the endorsement of the Progressive Coalition. The Democratic and Republican parties did not run candidates in the election with the Democrats stating that there were no viable candidates against Clavelle and the Republicans having nobody who could commit to the campaign. Haik Bedrosian, Daniel Gregory, and Michael Hackett ran as independent candidates.

Clavelle won in the general election with over seventy percent of the popular vote, but the Democratic Party, which had focused on the city council elections, gained two seats. Voter turnout for this election was the lowest since the 1981 election.

== Background ==
Peter Clavelle won the 1989 mayoral election as an independent candidate with the support of the Progressive Coalition. At the time of the 1991 mayoral election the composition of the city council was five Progressive Coalition members, four Democratic members, and four Republican members.

== Campaign ==
=== Candidates ===
==== Democratic ====
Judith Stephany, who was the Democratic nominee in the 1983 mayoral election and Maurice Mahoney, a member of the city council from the 1st district, were speculated as possible candidates for the Democratic nomination. David W. Curtis, the chair of the Burlington Democratic Party, stated that the Democrats would run a candidate in the mayoral election. However, on January 23, 1991, the Democratic caucus did not nominate a candidate and a motion by Ion Laskaris to not run a candidate was approved. Laskaris stated that there were no candidates that could defeat Clavelle. The Democratic Party decided to not endorse Clavelle. The Democrats instead focused on winning control of the city council.

==== Progressive Coalition ====
Terry Bouricius, co-chair of the Progressive Coalition, stated that there was no interest within the coalition to primary Clavelle and he also stated that Clavelle "did not run just to run for one term". Nancy Chioffi, who was the 1989 Democratic mayoral nominee, stated that Clavelle was enjoying the position of mayor and that she would be "amazed if he didn't run". Clavelle announced on December 17, 1990, that he would run for reelection and that he would seek the endorsement of the coalition. Clavelle won the endorsement of the coalition on December 19, with a unanimous vote. Clavelle focused on the passage of ballot propositions of a 6.5 cent tax increase per $100 property value for school funding and a $1 million bond to expand two elementary schools.

==== Republican ====
The Republican Party, which had not run a candidate in the 1985, 1987, and 1989 elections, chose to not run a candidate in the election at its caucus on January 25. Bob Minkewicz, the chair of the Burlington Republican Party, stated that nobody could commit to running a campaign against Clavelle.

==== Other ====
Haik Bedrosian, a senior at Burlington High School, announced on January 22, 1991, that he would run for mayor as an independent candidate stating that he wanted to empower the youth and increase youth representation in office and because there were no other candidates in the race. Clavelle welcomed Bedrosian and stated that he would not be "running against Haik or any other candidate", but instead running on "a record and a vision of the future". Daniel Gregory announced on January 28, that he would run as an independent. Michael Hackett, who had unsuccessfully run for office fifteen times, ran as an independent candidate.

=== General election ===
Bedrosian called for Clavelle, Gregory, and Hackett to agree to a campaign finance limit of $5,000. Gregory did not agree to the limit, but stated that he would spend that much during the campaign. During the campaign there was one event where the mayoral candidates gave statements and answered questions and two debates.

Clavelle won the election against Bedrosian, Gregory, and Hackett. Although Hackett lost the mayoral election he narrowly defeated David L.R. Houston, an incumbent member of the school commission from the 3rd district, by three votes. The mayoral election had a voter turnout of 36% which was the lowest turnout for a mayoral election since 1981. The Democrats gained two seats on the city council from the Republicans bringing the composition of the thirteen-member city council to five Progressive Coalition members, six Democratic members, and two Republican members.

== Results ==
1991 Burlington, Vermont mayoral election
Party	Candidate	Votes	%	±%
Progressive Coalition	Peter Clavelle (incumbent)	6,162	77.96%	+24.2%
Independent	Haik Bedrosian	865	10.94%	+10.94%
Independent	Daniel Gregory	522	6.60%	+6.60%
Independent	Michael Hackett	355	4.49%	+3.63%
Total votes		7,904	100.00%	

=== Results by ward ===
Ward	Clavelle	Votes	Bedrosian	Votes	Gregory	Votes	Hackett	Votes	Total votes	Votes
Ward 1	82.51%	722	8.91%	78	5.37%	47	3.20%	28	100.00%	875
Ward 2	80.98%	681	8.67%	73	5.59%	47	4.76%	40	100.00%	841
Ward 3	80.74%	943	7.62%	89	5.91%	69	5.74%	67	100.00%	1,168
Ward 4	71.93%	1,840	15.44%	395	8.25%	211	4.38%	112	100.00%	2,558
Ward 5	79.48%	1,046	9.35%	123	6.08%	80	5.09%	67	100.00%	1,316
Ward 6	81.15%	930	9.34%	107	5.93%	68	3.58%	41	100.00%	1,146
