= Francis Cain =

Francis Cain may refer to:

- Jim Cain (ice hockey) (1902–1962), Canadian ice hockey defenceman
- Francis J. Cain (1922–2019), mayor of Burlington, Vermont
