= Vermont Green Party =

Vermont affiliate of the Green Party

- French name: Vermont Parti Vert
- Founded: 2002
- Dissolved: 2011
- Split from: Progressive Party, Grassroots Party
- Merged into: Progressive Party
- Headquarters: Montpelier
- Ideology: Green politics
- Political position: Left-wing
- National affiliation: Green Party of the United States
- Colors: Green

Website
- vermontgreenparty.org

The Vermont Green Party (VGP) or Vermont Greens formed in 2002 and was a state-level political party in Vermont.

They were formed out of organizing around Ralph Nader's presidential campaigns in 1996 and 2000. The VGP was one of two established state green parties that refused to place the 2004 national presidential nominee, David Cobb on its ballot line, endorsing Nader's independent campaign instead. The party ran statewide and local candidates from 2002 to 2010, but was split by internal tensions and both factions dissolved by 2011 and were absorbed back into the Progressive Party.

== History ==
Murray Bookchin and his friends, inspired by The Greens of West Germany, formed the Green Party in Burlington, Vermont. Rudolf Bahro, one of the founding members of The Greens, met Bookchin and the Greens in 1983. Howie Hawkins stated that Bookchin inspired him to become involved with Green politics. The Progressive Coalition accused the Greens of attempting to spoil the 1989 Burlington mayoral election and for causing Erhard Mahnke, the Progressive president of the city council, to lose reelection in 1990. Internal disagreements on how to respond to spoiler accusations resulted in the party disbanding a splinter group, Northern Vermont Greens, being formed.

== Statewide candidates ==
Election	Candidate	Votes	Percentage
1996 President	Ralph Nader	5,585	2.16%
2000 President*	Ralph Nader	20,374	6.92%
2004 Senate	Craig Hill	3,999	1.30%
2004 Attorney General	James Marc Leas	8,769	3.00%
2006 Senate	Craig Hill	1,536	0.59%
2006 US Representative	Bruce Marshall	994	0.38%
2006 Governor	Jim Hogue	1,936	0.74%

- While the national Green Party nominee in 2000, Nader ran on the Vermont Progressive Party ballot line.

The VGP endorsed the Progressive Party's Michael Badamo for Governor in 2002 and Ralph Nader's independent run in 2004. Due to the breakup of the Vermont Green Party, Green presidential nominees, Cynthia McKinney in 2008 and Jill Stein in 2012, ran as write-in candidates in Vermont.

== Local candidates ==
=== 2004 election ===
Office	Candidate	Votes	Percentage
Vermont Senate	Ben Clarke	9,650	3.0%
Chittenden County High Bailiff	Greg Delanty	17,359	28%
Burlington Justice of the Peace	Owen Mulligan	4,210	2.8%
Burlington Justice of the Peace	Jay Vos	3,923	2.5%
Hinesburg Justice of the Peace	Craig Chevrier	889	5.8%

The Burlington Green Party also ran candidates in 2007 and 2009.

== Works cited ==
- Biehl, Janet (2015). Ecology or Catastrophe: The Life of Murray Bookchin. Oxford University Press. ISBN 9780199342488.
