= 1989 Burlington, Vermont mayoral election =

- March 3, 1989
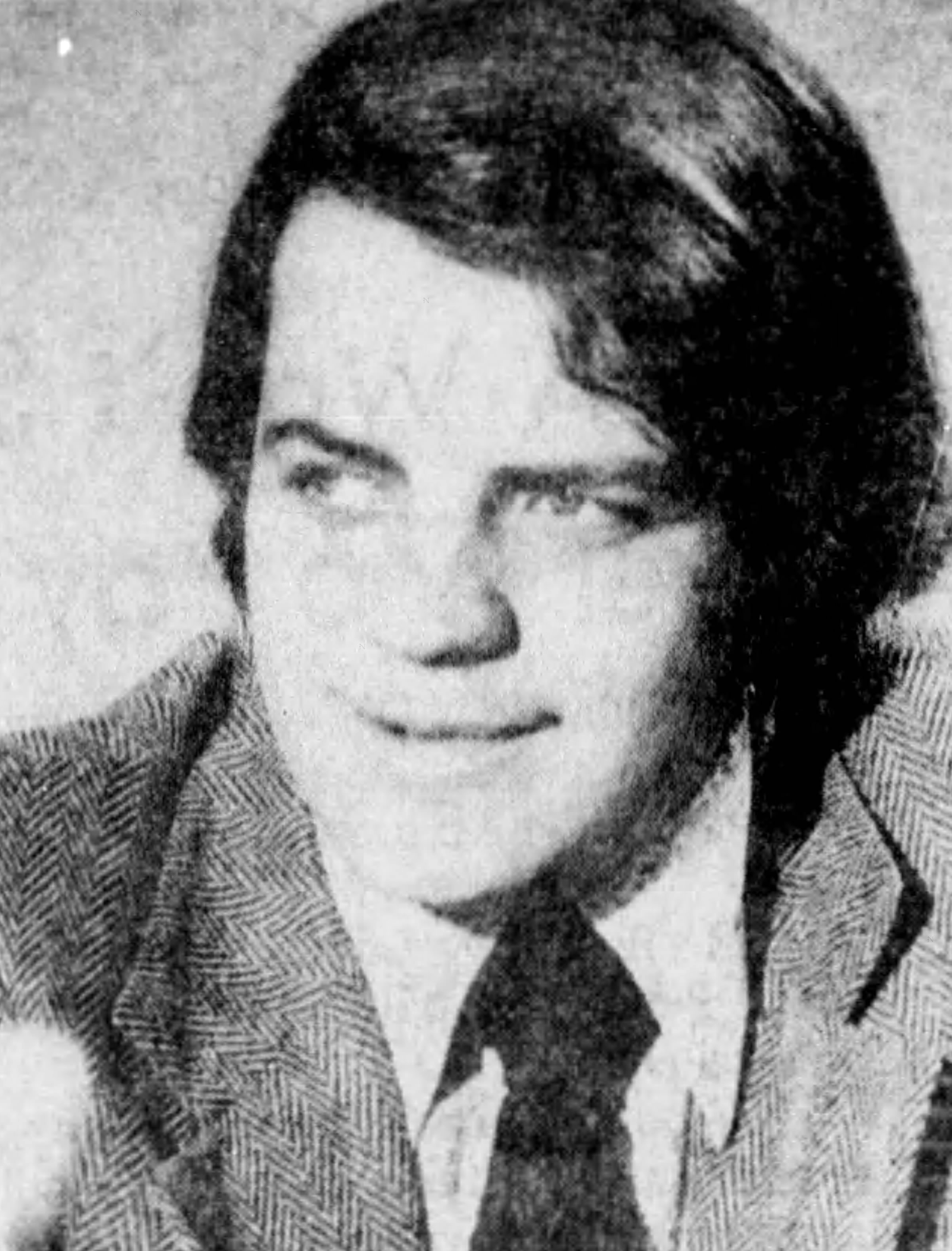

Nominee	Peter Clavelle	Nancy Chioffi
Party	Independent	Democratic
Popular vote	5,917	4,624
Percentage	53.76%	42.01%
- Results by city council district Clavelle: Clavelle—50–60% Clavelle—60–70% Chioffi: Chioffi—40–50% Chioffi—50–60%
Mayor of Burlington before election
Bernie Sanders
Independent
Elected Mayor of Burlington
Peter Clavelle
Independent

The 1989 Burlington, Vermont mayoral election was held on March 3, 1989. Incumbent Independent Mayor Bernie Sanders did not seek reelection to a fifth term. Peter Clavelle ran as an independent candidate, with the support of the Progressive Coalition, and defeated Democratic nominee Nancy Chioffi.

Chioffi, a member of the city council, defeated city councilor Bill Aswad and Rick Sharp for the Democratic nomination. Clavelle won the endorsement of the Progressive Coalition without opposition although city treasurer John Leopold and city councilor Terry Bouricius had considered running. The Republican Party did not run a candidate in the election and instead offered support for Chioffi. Sandra Baird ran with the Green Party nomination and Michael Hackett ran with the Tax Revolt nomination.

== Background ==
Bernie Sanders won election as Mayor of Burlington, Vermont, in the 1981 mayoral election as an independent. He won reelection in the 1983, 1985, and 1987 elections. During the 1987 campaign Sanders stated that he would not seek reelection in 1989, stating that "eight years is enough and I think it is time for new leadership, which does exist within the coalition, to come up".

During Sanders' mayoralty the composition of the thirteen-member city council changed from having ten Democratic members and three Republicans after the 1980 election to the pro-Sanders Progressive Coalition holding six of the seats after the 1987 election.

== Campaign ==
=== Candidates ===
==== Democratic ====
Rick Sharp, who had previous run unsuccessful campaigns for city council and state senate, announced on November 21, 1988, that he would seek the Democratic nomination for mayor. Bill Aswad, a member of the city council from the 4th district, announced on November 25, that he would seek the Democratic nomination. Nancy Chioffi, president of the city council, announced on December 1, that she would run for the Democratic nomination. Chioffi defeated Aswad and Sharp for the Democratic nomination by five votes at the caucus on January 11, 1989.

1989 Burlington Democratic mayoral caucus
Party	Candidate	Votes	%	±%
Democratic	Nancy Chioffi	421	48.95%	
Democratic	Bill Aswad	416	48.37%	
Democratic	Rick Sharp	23	2.67%	
Total votes		860	100.00%	

==== Progressive Coalition ====
The Progressive Coalition would give its nomination to any non-Democratic or Republican endorsed candidate, even if they ran as an independent, their support if they received 66% of the vote at the coalition's caucus.

Jonathan Leopold, the city treasurer, Terry Bouricius, a member of the city council from the second district, and Peter Clavelle, the Community and Economic Development Director, were considered the most likely candidates for the coalition's nomination. Gene Bergman, the chair of the coalition, stated that he believed the choices at the caucus would be Leopold, Bouricius, and Clavelle.

Clavelle announced on November 21, 1988, that he would seek the endorsement of the coalition for mayor and formally announced his campaign on November 29, as an independent candidate. On December 5, Leopold announced that he would not run for mayor and chose to take a break from politics for family reason. Bouricius offered his name for consideration, but did not actively campaign for the endorsement of the coalition. Bouricius gave a speech at the caucus giving his support to Clavelle while Leopold refused to endorse any candidate in the election.

The coalition caucus, which had a keynote address from Sanders, was held on December 8. Clavelle won the endorsement of the coalition with a unanimous vote. Clavelle wrote a letter to Sanders on November 29, stating that if he won the endorsement of the coalition that he would resign as Community and Economic Development Director and after his victory he offered his resignation on December 22, which was effective on January 30, 1989.

==== Republican ====
Margaret Green considered running for the Republican nomination for mayor. Theodore Riehle, a Republican who had served as president of the city council, stated that Green would not run if Aswad won the Democratic nomination. Riehle had considered running for mayor, but declined. Green announced that she would not run after Chioffi won the Democratic nomination stating that she was "very happy with the selection" and offered to aid the Democratic campaign. The Republican caucus, which was attended by less than twenty-five people, did not select a mayoral candidate despite Chair Stephen Converse Brooks asking for mayoral nominations twice. Brooks blamed the lack of a candidate for the small attendance and stated that most Republicans would vote for Chioffi.

==== Other ====
Ed Bickford, who had run in the 1987 mayoral election, announced on December 7, 1988, that he would run for mayor as an independent, but dropped out on January 22, 1989, and endorsed Clavelle stating that "I just feel that Peter Clavelle is more qualified for the job than I am". Sandra Baird announced on January 9, 1989, that she would run for mayor with the Green Party's nomination. Michael Hackett, a teacher who had unsuccessfully run for United States Senate, mayor as the Neutral Party nominee in 1985, and school board, ran for mayor as the Tax Revolt candidate and called for a twenty percent decrease in property taxes.

==== General election ====
Clavelle asked for Chioffi to agree to a campaign spending limit of $35,000 for each of their campaigns, but Chioffi refused. Clavelle also asked for Chioffi to not run any television ads, as Clavelle couldn't afford to air any ads on television and he wanted to prevent the campaign expenses from rising, which Chioffi agreed to. There were ten debates during the campaign. During the campaign Clavelle and Sanders accused Chioffi of conducting a negative campaign.

The Champlain Valley National Organization for Women was critical of Chioffi in their endorsement of Clavelle stating that her positions on the Equal Rights Amendment and gay rights were weak and that Chioffi was "a disappointment" according to Terry Ramsey, the president of the Champlain Valley National Organization for Women. Sanders gave his endorsement to Clavelle.

During the campaign Clavelle raised $27,322 and spent $24,287 with no debt remaining, Chioffi raised $20,529 and spent $19,171 with $4,600 in debt, Biard raised $1,744 and spent $906, and Hackett did not file a campaign finance form meaning that he raised less than $100 and he stated at a forum that he had raised $60 and given half of it to charity.

== Polling ==
Poll source	Date(s)	Sample size	Margin of Error	Clavelle	Chioffi	Baird	Hackett	Undecided
The Burlington Free Press	February 1989	342 voters	± 6.5%	40.00%'	31.00%	6.00%	2.00%	21%

== Results ==
1989 Burlington, Vermont mayoral election
Party	Candidate	Votes	%	±%
Independent	Peter Clavelle	5,917	53.76%	+53.76%
Democratic	Nancy Chioffi	4,624	42.01%	−2.76%
Green	Sandra Baird	370	3.36%	+3.36%
Tax Revolt	Michael Hackett	95	0.86%	+0.86%
Total votes		11,006	100.00%	

=== Results by ward ===
Ward	Clavelle	Votes	Chioffi	Votes	Baird	Votes	Hackett	Votes	Total votes	Votes
Ward 1	57.28%	826	37.86%	546	4.51%	65	0.35%	5	100.00%	1,442
Ward 2	65.71%	799	28.04%	341	5.26%	64	0.99%	12	100.00%	1,216
Ward 3	66.78%	1,011	27.94%	423	4.43%	67	0.86%	13	100.00%	1,514
Ward 4	45.95%	1,515	51.14%	1,686	1.88%	62	1.03%	34	100.00%	3,297
Ward 5	48.22%	978	48.42%	982	2.47%	50	0.89%	18	100.00%	2,028
Ward 6	52.22%	788	42.81%	646	4.11%	62	0.86%	13	100.00%	1,509

== Endorsements ==
Baird endorsements

Organizations

- Champlain Valley Women's Political Caucus
Chioffi endorsements

Organizations

- Madeleine Kunin, 77th Governor of Vermont (1985–1991)
Clavelle endorsements

Political parties

- Progressive Coalition

State legislators

- Elizabeth M. Ready, member of the Vermont Senate

Local officials

- Bernie Sanders, Mayor of Burlington, Vermont (1981–1989)
- Terry Bouricius, member of the Burlington, Vermont city council from the 2nd district

Organizations

- Champlain Valley National Organization for Women

Newspapers

- The Burlington Free Press

Individuals

- Ed Bickford, former candidate for mayor
- Caryl Stewart, former chair of the Burlington Democratic Party and mayoral candidate in 1987
