= Jean Ankeney =

American politician, teacher, and public health nurse

Jean Ankeney (March 29, 1922 – May 14, 2005) was an American politician, teacher, and public health nurse.

Born in Fuzhou, China, to American missionaries, Ankeney grew up in Williamstown, Massachusetts. She received her bachelor's degree from Hiram College and her master's degree from Case Western Reserve University. Ankeney was a teacher and public health nurse. In 1975, Ankeney moved to Vermont and lived in St. George, Vermont. From 1993 to 2002, Ankeney served in the Vermont State Senate and was a Democrat. Ankeney died at her home in St. George, Vermont of a rare form of lung cancer.
