= 1985 Burlington, Vermont mayoral election =

- March 5, 1985
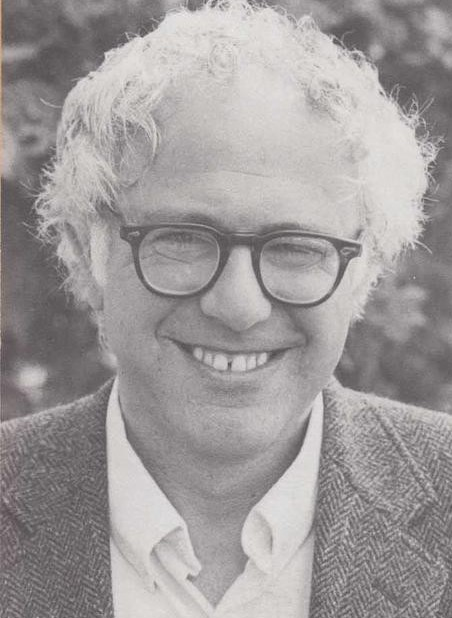

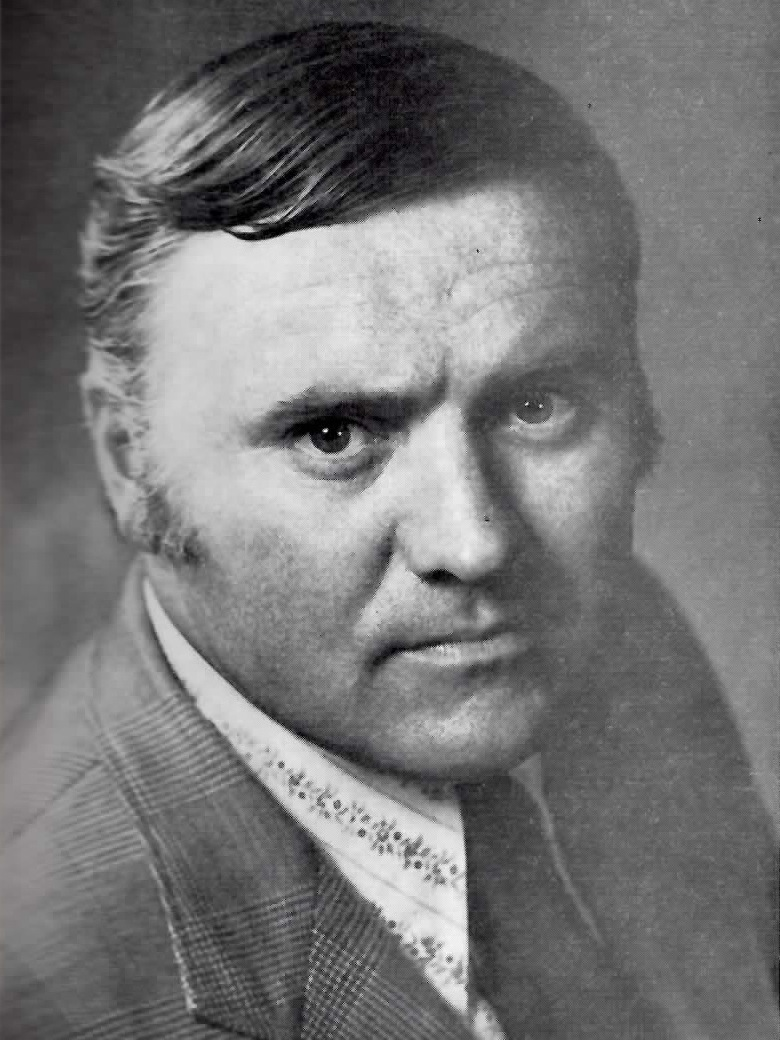

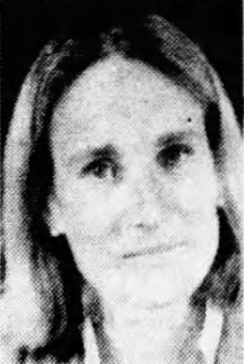
Nominee	Bernie Sanders	Brian D. Burns	Diane Gallagher
Party	Independent	Democratic	Independent
Popular vote	5,760	3,275	1,234
Percentage	55.32%	31.45%	11.85%
- Results by city council district Sanders: Sanders—50–60% Sanders—60–70% Sanders—70–80% Tied: Tied—39%
Mayor of Burlington before election
Bernie Sanders
Independent
Elected Mayor of Burlington
Bernie Sanders
Independent

The 1985 Burlington, Vermont mayoral election was held March 5, 1985. Incumbent Mayor Bernie Sanders won with 56.09% of the popular vote against Democratic nominee Brian D. Burns, independent Diane Gallagher, and various other minor candidates.

Gallagher initially sought the nomination of the Republican Party, but later became an independent candidate. William Murray and Richard Sartelle sought the Republican nomination, but the Republican caucus voted unanimously to not nominate a candidate. Sartelle also unsuccessfully sought the nomination of the Liberty Union Party which also chose to not nominate a candidate.

== Campaign ==
=== Candidates ===
==== Independents ====
Incumbent Mayor Bernie Sanders, who won as an independent in the 1981 and 1983 elections, initially considered not seeking a third term as Mayor of Burlington, Vermont, but announced on December 5, 1984, that he would seek a third term. Sanders formally launched his campaign on December 7. The Progressive Coalition had considered running Gary DeCarolis, a member of the city council from the 3rd district, or Peter Clavelle for mayor if Sanders did not run.

Richard Sartelle and John Tatro also filed to run as independents while Michael Hackett filed under the Neutral Party. Sartelle had worked as an aide for Sanders during the 1981 election before breaking with him during the 1983 election and later referring to Sanders as dictatorial during the 1985 campaign. He sought the endorsement of the Liberty Union Party, but the party chose to not endorse any candidate. Tatro, a toy maker and perennial candidate, had run numerous previous campaigns for both congress and the Burlington city council. He advocated for homeless individuals to be housed in unused apartments, a ban on glass containers and the arrest of social workers who approved "underserving applicants" for social programs.

==== Democratic ====
Brian D. Burns, who served as the 72nd Lieutenant Governor of Vermont and whose brother, James Burns, was a staunch critic of Sanders on the Burlington city council until a pro-Sanders candidate defeated him, announced on December 12, 1984, that he would seek the Democratic nomination for the mayoralty. Burns formally announced his candidacy for mayor on December 19.

Burns defeated Terje Anderson, a gay man who supported Jesse Jackson during the 1984 Democratic presidential primaries, a member of the Rainbow Coalition, and who served on the 1984 Democratic platform committee, by a vote of 109 to 19. Anderson refused to endorse Burns at the convention, accusing him of abandoning liberal Democrats, and stating to The Burlington Free Press that he expected Sanders to win re-election.

==== Republican ====
Diane Gallagher, a Republican member of the city council from the sixth ward, announced that she would run for the mayoralty. However, on January 14, 1985, Gallagher announced that she would not seek the Republican nomination and would instead seek the mayoralty as an independent. She withdrew citing opposition to her candidacy within the Republican Party, who wanted to unite behind Brian Burns, and her desire to avoid becoming a divisive force. She also stated that over sixty percent of voters in Burlington were independents.

Maggie Green, who was considered as the "perfect unity candidate" by The Burlington Free Press, chose not to run for the Republican nomination. William Murray and Richard Sartelle sought the Republican nomination, but the Republican caucus voted unanimously to not nominate a candidate.

==== Libertarian ====
William J. Murray announced on January 16, 1985, that he would seek the mayoralty as a Libertarian and formally announced his campaign on January 28.

=== Fundraising ===
During the campaign Sanders had raised $24,428, spent $24,384, and had remaining debts of $555. Burns raised $21,465, spent $23,753, and had remaining debts of around $3,000. Gallagher had raised $10,060, spent $9,030, and had remaining debts of $1,271.

== Endorsements ==
Diane Gallagher (I)

State officials

- Helen Riehle, state representative

== Polling ==
Poll source	Date(s)	Sample size	Margin of Error	Sanders	Burns	Gallagher	Others	Undecided
The Burlington Free Press/University of Vermont	February 13–15, 1985	537 people	± 5%	33.75%'	15.1%	6.40%	0.60%	25.50%

== Results ==
1985 Burlington, Vermont mayoral election
Party	Candidate	Votes	%	±%
Independent	Bernie Sanders (incumbent)	5,760	55.32%	+3.20%
Democratic	Brian D. Burns	3,275	31.45%	+0.77%
Independent	Diane Gallagher	1,234	11.85%	+11.85%
Libertarian	William Murray	72	0.69%	+0.69%
Independent	Richard Sartelle	34	0.33%	+0.33%
Neutral	Michael Hackett	20	0.19%	+0.19%
Independent	John Tatro	17	0.16%	+0.16%
Total votes		10,412	100.00%	

=== Results by ward ===
Ward	Sanders	Votes	Burns	Votes	Gallagher	Votes	Murray	Votes	Sartelle	Votes	Hackett	Votes	Tatro	Votes	Total votes	Votes
Ward 1	63.11%	982	28.15%	438	7.84%	122	0.39%	6	0.19%	3	0.19%	3	0.13%	2	100.00%	1,556
Ward 2	71.45%	911	21.33%	272	6.12%	78	0.71%	9	0.00%	0	0.16%	2	0.24%	3	100.00%	1,275
Ward 3	69.34%	995	21.74%	312	7.32%	105	0.49%	7	0.70%	10	0.28%	4	0.14%	2	100.00%	1,435
Ward 4	39.61%	1,083	39.61%	1,083	18.98%	519	0.95%	26	0.48%	13	0.15%	4	0.22%	6	100.00%	2,734
Ward 5	53.22%	958	37.06%	667	8.78%	158	0.67%	12	0.06%	1	0.22%	4	0.00%	0	100.00%	1,800
Ward 6	51.55%	831	31.20%	503	15.63%	252	0.74%	12	0.43%	7	0.19%	3	0.25%	4	100.00%	1,612
