= Peter Clavelle =

American politician (born 1949)

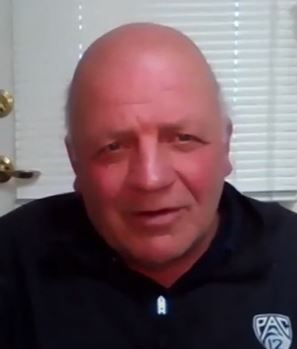
- Clavelle in 2021

38th & 40th Mayor of Burlington
- In office April 3, 1995 – April 1, 2006
- Preceded by: Peter Brownell
- Succeeded by: Bob Kiss
- In office April 4, 1989 – April 5, 1993
- Preceded by: Bernie Sanders
- Succeeded by: Peter Brownell

Personal details
- Born: May 10, 1949 (age 77) Winooski, Vermont, U.S.
- Party: Progressive (1989–2004, 2005–present)
- Other political affiliations: Democratic (2004); Independent (before 1989)
- Spouse: Betsy Ferries
- Children: 3
- Education: Saint Anselm College (BA); Syracuse University (MPA)

Peter A. Clavelle (born May 10, 1949) is an American politician who served as the 38th and 40th mayor of Burlington, Vermont, and was the first member of a third party to hold the office since James Edmund Burke in 1935. Bernie Sanders also won several elections as an independent candidate in the 1980s (e.g. in 1981, in 1983, in 1985, in 1987), defeating both Republican and Democratic candidates. Sanders and Clavelle founded the Vermont Progressive Party during Sanders' time as mayor.

== Early life and education ==
Peter A. Clavelle was born on May 10, 1949, to Raymond and Eleanor Clavelle in Winooski, Vermont. He earned a Bachelor of Arts degree in urban studies from Saint Anselm College and a Master of Public Administration from the Maxwell School of Citizenship and Public Affairs at Syracuse University.

== Career ==
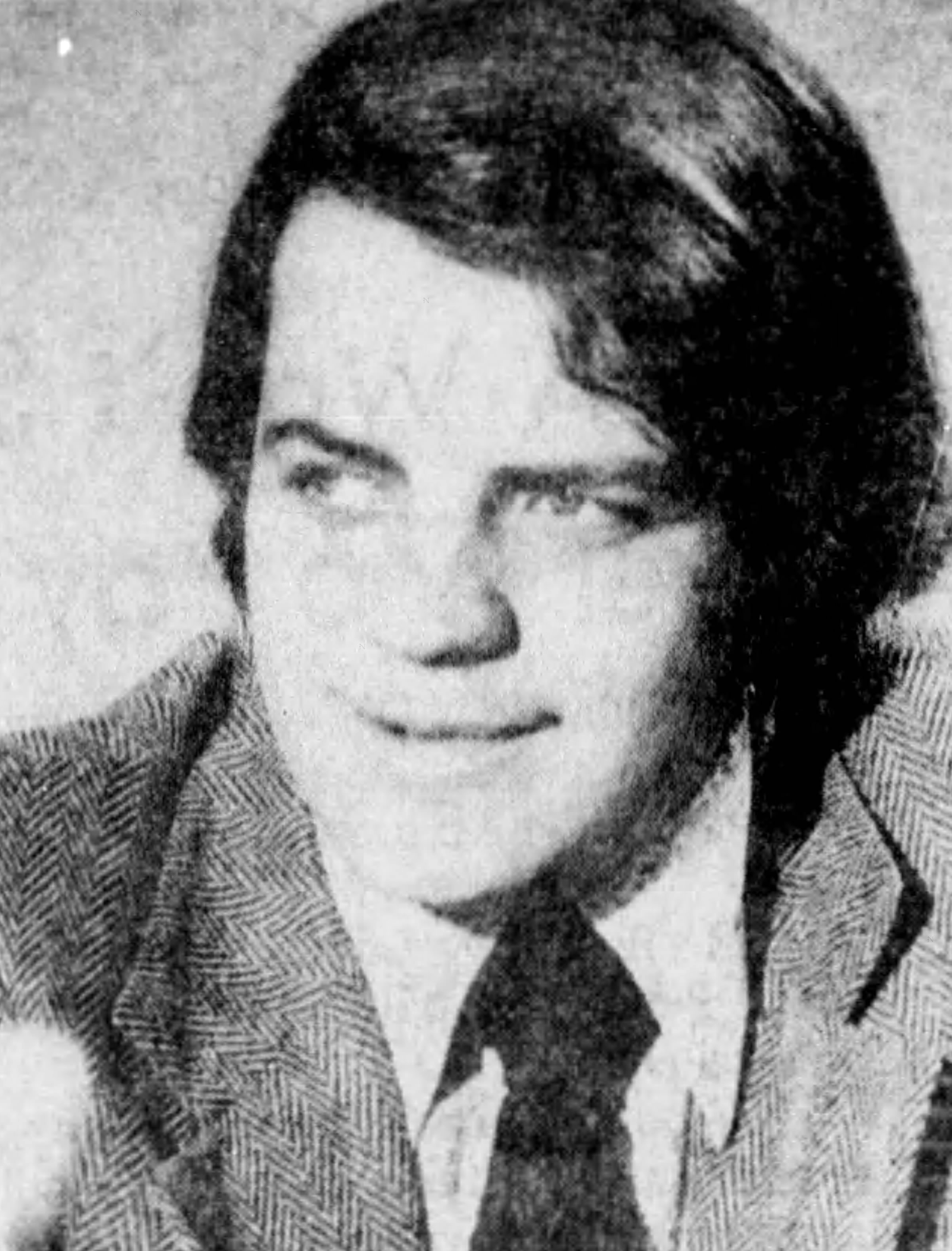
Clavelle c. 1976

In 1961, he was elected mayor of Winooski for a day by his Boy Scout troop. In 1972 he was appointed as Castleton's town manager and in 1976 was appointed as Winooski's city manager. During Bernie Sanders' tenure as mayor of Burlington, Clavelle served as Burlington's personnel director and later as director of the Community and Economic Development Office from 1983 to 1989.

=== 1989–1993 mayoral terms ===
Clavelle was elected mayor in 1989 as a Progressive. During the 1993 mayoral election he raised almost twice as much money as his Republican opponent Peter C. Brownell although Brownell was able to take the Burlington police union's endorsement from Clavelle. On March 3 Brownell unexpectedly defeated Clavelle with 5,410 votes to 4,686 votes. Clavelle stated that he lost due to the controversy over his proposal (which was passed) to have the city pay for healthcare benefits for domestic partners of city workers.

=== 1995–2006 mayoral terms ===
Clavelle returned to the mayor's office two years later in 1995, after defeating Burlington's 39th Mayor Peter Brownell.

The Draft Clavelle for Governor Committee was formed on September 11, 1998, and attempted to gather 1,000 signatures to place Peter Clavelle on the ballot. However, Clavelle announced that he would not run on September 14.

In 2004, Clavelle ran for Governor of Vermont as a Democrat against incumbent Governor Jim Douglas and four other candidates. In order to run in the Democratic Party primary, Clavelle had to change party affiliation, as required by state law. He received the endorsement of five-term former Democratic Governor Howard Dean, but was defeated, 38% to 59%. After Burlington's switch to instant-runoff voting in 2005, Clavelle decided not to run in the 2006 election.

Clavelle did not seek re-election to an eighth term as mayor in the 2006 Burlington mayoral election. Bob Kiss succeeded Clavelle as mayor in April 2006.

In 2012, Clavelle moved to Albania as a staff member on a USAID-funded Non Governmental Organization called TetraTech. He claims to have done work advancing "local governance" in the region. He returned to Vermont in 2016.

== Electoral history ==
Peter Clavelle electoral history

1989 Burlington, Vermont mayoral election
| Party | Candidate | Votes | % |
|---|---|---|---|
| Independent | Peter Clavelle | 5,917 | 53.76% |
| Democratic | Nancy Chioffi | 4,624 | 42.01% |
| Green | Sandy L. Baird | 370 | 3.36% |
| Tax Revolt Party | Michael Hackett | 95 | 0.86% |
| Total votes | | 11,006 | 100.00% |

1991 Burlington, Vermont mayoral election
| Party | Candidate | Votes | % |
|---|---|---|---|
| Independent | Peter Clavelle (incumbent) | 5,939 | 77.84% |
| Independent | Haik Bedrosian | 838 | 10.98% |
| Independent | Daniel H. Gregory | 517 | 6.78% |
| Independent | Michael Hackett | 336 | 4.40% |
| Total votes | | 7,630 | 100.00% |

1993 Burlington, Vermont mayoral election
| Party | Candidate | Votes | % |
|---|---|---|---|
| Republican | Peter Brownell | 5,410 | 53.59% |
| Independent | Peter Clavelle (incumbent) | 4,686 | 46.41% |
| Total votes | | 10,096 | 100.00% |

1995 Burlington, Vermont mayoral election
| Party | Candidate | Votes | % |
|---|---|---|---|
| Progressive | Peter Clavelle | 4,933 | 43.29% |
| Republican | Peter Brownell (incumbent) | 4,728 | 41.49% |
| Democratic | Paul Lafayette | 1,735 | 15.23% |
| Total votes | | 11,396 | 100.00% |

1997 Burlington, Vermont mayoral election
| Party | Candidate | Votes | % |
|---|---|---|---|
| Progressive | Peter Clavelle (incumbent) | 4,491 | 76.14% |
| Independent | Louis Beaudin | 413 | 7.00% |
| Independent | Michael R. Brown | 398 | 6.75% |
| Write-in | | 380 | 6.44% |
| Independent | Maja Capps | 216 | 3.66% |
| Total votes | | 5,898 | 100.00% |

1999 Burlington, Vermont mayoral election
| Party | Candidate | Votes | % |
|---|---|---|---|
| Progressive | Peter Clavelle (incumbent) | 5,829 | 60.32% |
| Republican | Kurt Wright | 3,834 | 39.68% |
| Total votes | | 9,663 | 100.00% |

2001 Burlington, Vermont mayoral election
| Party | Candidate | Votes | % |
|---|---|---|---|
| Progressive | Peter Clavelle (incumbent) | 3,426 | 55.18% |
| Republican | Kevin Curley | 2,664 | 42.91% |
| Independent | Haik Bedrosian | 84 | 1.35% |
| Independent | John Pius Hogan | 35 | 0.56% |
| Total votes | | 6,209 | 100.00% |

2003 Burlington, Vermont mayoral election
| Party | Candidate | Votes | % |
|---|---|---|---|
| Progressive | Peter Clavelle (incumbent) | 9,270 | 63.69% |
| Write-in | | 2,660 | 18.28% |
| Republican | Michael R. Brown | 2,624 | 18.03% |
| Total votes | | 14,554 | 100.00% |

2004 Vermont gubernatorial election
Primary election
| Party | Candidate | Votes | % |
|---|---|---|---|
| Democratic | Peter Clavelle | 23,218 | 94.65% |
| Write-in | | 1,313 | 5.35% |
| Total votes | | 24,531 | 100.00% |
General election
| Republican | Jim Douglas (incumbent) | 181,540 | 58.70% |
| Democratic | Peter Clavelle | 117,327 | 37.93% |
| Marijuana | Cris Ericson | 4,221 | 1.36% |
| Independent | Patricia Hejny | 2,431 | 0.79% |
| Libertarian | Hardy Machia | 2,263 | 0.73% |
| Liberty Union | Peter Diamondstone | 1,298 | 0.42% |
| Write-in | | 205 | 0.07% |
| Total votes | | 309,285 | 100.00% |

== See also ==
- 2004 Vermont gubernatorial election
- List of elected socialist mayors in the United States

Political offices
| Preceded by Bernie Sanders | Mayor of Burlington; 1989–1993 | Succeeded by Peter C. Brownell |
| Preceded by Peter C. Brownell | Mayor of Burlington; 1995–2006 | Succeeded by Bob Kiss |
Party political offices
| Preceded by Doug Racine | Democratic nominee for Governor of Vermont; 2004 | Succeeded by Scudder Parker |
