= Helen Riehle =

American politician from Vermont

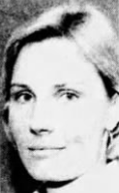
- Riehle in 1983

Member of the Vermont Senate from the Chittenden district
- In office March 2016 – January 6, 2017
- Preceded by: Diane Snelling
- Succeeded by: Debbie Ingram; Christopher Pearson
- In office January 1993 – January 2001

Member of the Vermont House of Representatives
- In office 11 February 1983 – January 1993
- Preceded by: Theodore Riehle

Personal details
- Born: May 5, 1950 (age 76) Somerville, New Jersey, U.S.
- Party: Republican
- Spouse: Theodore
- Children: 3
- Education: University of Vermont (BS)
- Occupation: Middle School Teacher

Helen Riehle is an American politician from the state of Vermont who served as a U.S. Republican Party member of the Vermont Senate, representing all of Chittenden County except for the town of Colchester. She is chair of the South Burlington City Council and resides in that city. Having previously served in both the State House and Senate, she was appointed by Governor Peter Shumlin in March 2016 to succeed Diane Snelling, who had earlier resigned.
