= Francis J. Cain =

American politician (1922–2019)

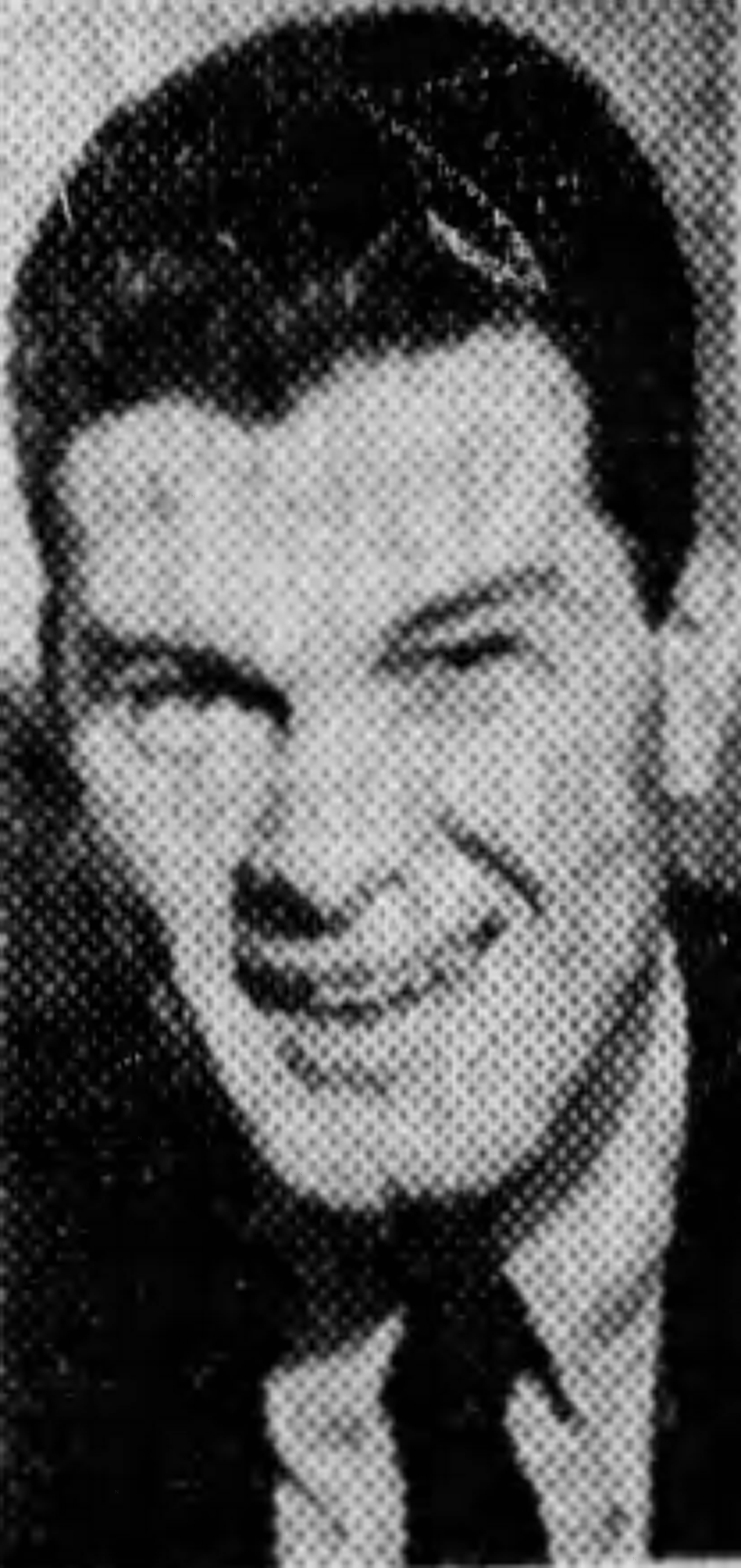
- Cain in 1965

35th Mayor of Burlington
- In office June 7, 1965 – April 5, 1971
- Preceded by: Edward A. Keenan
- Succeeded by: Gordon Paquette

Member of the Burlington, Vermont Board of Aldermen
- In office 1962 – April 19, 1965
- Preceded by: William L. Wright
- Succeeded by: R. Allan Paul

Personal details
- Born: Francis Joseph Cain; December 20, 1922 Fanny Allen Hospital, Colchester, Vermont
- Died: March 14, 2019 (aged 96) Shelburne, Vermont
- Party: Democratic
- Spouse: Mary Jane Allen
- Children: 10
- Parents: Leo Cain (father); Mary Elizabeth Carpenter (mother)
- Education: Saint Michael's College

Military service
- Allegiance: United States
- Branch/service: United States Navy
- Years of service: 1943-1946
- Battles/wars: World War II

Francis J. Cain (December 20, 1922 – March 14, 2019) was an American politician and insurance agent who served as the 35th Mayor of Burlington, Vermont. During his tenure he was the highest office holder in the Vermont Democratic Party.

== Early life ==
On December 20, 1922, Cain was born in Fanny Allen Hospital (now the University of Vermont Medical Center) in Colchester, Vermont, to Leo and Mary Cain.

In 1940, he graduated from Cathedral High School and in 1943 graduated from Saint Michael's College with a bachelor’s degree in English literature.

In 1947, Cain married Mary Jane Allen whom he would later have ten children with and would remain married with for the rest of his life. In 1946, he became affiliated with an insurance agency and in 1956, created his own insurance agency in Burlington, Vermont.

== Career ==
In 1962, Cain was elected as an alderman from city ward one to succeed William L. Wright who was not seeking reelection.

On January 26, 1965, he announced his intention to seek the Democratic nomination for the mayoralty of Burlington. On February 5, Cain won the Democratic nomination with 399 votes against city representative Richard Schmidt's 240 votes at the nomination caucus and on March 2, he defeated incumbent Republican mayor Edward Keenan with 5,520 votes against Keenan's 3,447 votes. On April 19, he resigned from his position as alderman to prepare for his mayoral duties and on June 7, 1965, he was inaugurated as mayor by the city clerk.

While Vermont counties were debating over the creation of sales taxes Cain asked a city attorney to create a sales tax proposal for Burlington that would be given to a city committee to study.

In 1971, Cain chose not to run for a fourth term as mayor stating that three terms were enough, but left open the possibility of him running for statewide or federal office; although he later chose not to run in the 1972 House election against expectations.

== Later life ==
After leaving the mayoralty Cain was elected to the presidency of the Greater Burlington Improvement Corporation which he served as until 1973. In 1974, he ran in the United States House of Representatives election in the at-large congressional district, but was defeated by state Attorney General Jim Jeffords. In 1975 Cain was appointed to the Lake Champlain Regional Chamber of Commerce and two years later was elected as its president. During the 1980 Democratic Party presidential primaries he endorsed Senator Ted Kennedy for the Democratic presidential nomination.

In 2017, Francis Cain Overlook was unveiled as an addition to Battery Park. On March 14, 2019, Cain died at his home in Shelburne, Vermont and was later called "the godfather of what is modern Burlington." by Mayor Miro Weinberger.
