= 1983 Burlington, Vermont mayoral election =

- March 1, 1983
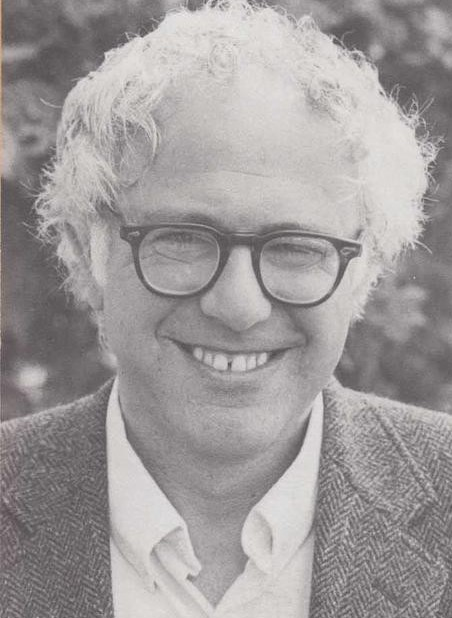

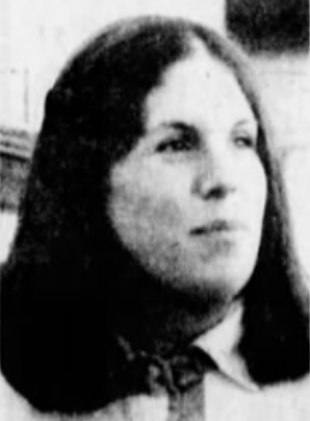

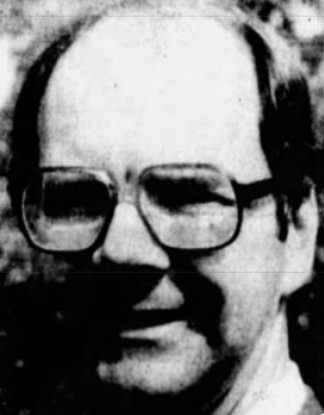
Nominee	Bernie Sanders	Judy Stephany	James Gilson
Party	Independent	Democratic	Republican
Popular vote	6,942	4,086	2,292
Percentage	52.12%	30.68%	17.21%
- Results by city council district Sanders: Sanders—40–50% Sanders—50–60% Sanders—60–70% Stephany: Stephany—40–50%
Mayor of Burlington before election
Bernie Sanders
Independent
Elected Mayor of Burlington
Bernie Sanders
Independent

The 1983 Burlington, Vermont mayoral election was held March 1, 1983. Incumbent Mayor Bernie Sanders won with 52.12% of the popular vote against Democratic nominee Judith Stephany and Republican nominee James Gilson.

The Democratic Party unsuccessfully sought to give its mayoral nomination to multiple politicians before choosing Stephany, who had launched her campaign hours before the selection caucus. She would later state that her late entry into the campaign had contributed to her defeat. In a 1985 survey, three quarters of Democratic voters surveyed reported supporting Sanders in this election.

== Candidates ==
=== Independent ===
Following his election in the 1981 race, Mayor Bernie Sanders faced difficulties with the Burlington city council, with him being opposed by eleven of the thirteen members of the board of aldermen. The council opposed measures proposed by Sanders, overrode his vetoes on legislation, and refused to assent to his political nominations. Sanders formed a coalition between independents and the Citizens Party, with this coalition winning several seats in the 1982 city council elections. Sanders announced on December 3, 1982, that he would seek reelection as mayor at Burlington's city hall. On January 22, 1983, the Citizens Party voted unanimously to endorse Sanders, although the incumbent ran as an independent. He spent $33,000 during the campaign.

=== Democratic ===
- Judith B. Stephany, Minority Leader of the Vermont House of Representatives
- William H. Williams, gas station owner
Democratic candidates (Note: The images in this gallery are in the public domain or are otherwise free to use. This gallery should not be construed as a list of major or noteworthy candidates. If a candidate is not included in this gallery, it is only because there are no high-quality, copyright-free photographs of them available on the Internet.)
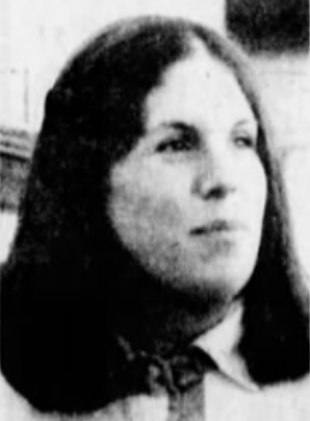
House Minority Leader
Judith B. Stephany

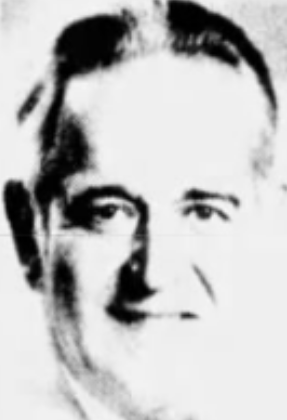
Gas station owner
William H. Williams

The Democratic Party of Burlington, Vermont, faced difficulties finding a mayoral candidate, as state senator Thomas Crowley, Chittenden County Chief Deputy State's Attorney Harold Eaton Jr. and Alderman James Burns all declined to run for the Democratic nomination. State senator Esther Sorrell considered running for the Democratic nomination, and an unsuccessful attempt was made to draft Mark Kaplan, also a state senator. Lieutenant Governor Madeleine Kunin also stated that she was not interesting in running for mayor despite polling showing her defeating Sanders. Alderwoman Joyce DeSautels frequently announced her wishes to run but was rendered an untenable candidate following her defeat to a Sanders-backed candidate in the 1982 city council elections and her subsequent criticism of the Burlington Democratic apparatus, with DeSautels accusing the party of being too accommodating with the mayor.

William H. Williams, a little-known gas station owner, was the first person to announce a campaign for the mayoralty when he announced that he would seek the Democratic nomination in August 1982.

State Representative Judith B. Stephany, who was serving as minority leader in the Vermont House of Representatives, announced her mayoral campaign hours before the Burlington Democratic caucus was set to select the party's mayoral nominee. Stephany won the Democratic nomination against Williams by a margin of three to one. Stephany initially chose to retain her seat and leadership position in the House of Representatives, but later announced that she would resign on January 30, 1983, to campaign for mayor.

=== Republican ===
James Gilson, the chairman of the Burlington School Board of Commissioners, announced on November 8, 1982, that he would run for the mayoralty as a Republican. He formally announced his candidacy at Burlington's city hall on November 12. Gilson won the Republican nomination with unanimous support on January 20, 1983.

== General election ==
Sanders proposed a campaign spending limit of $15,000, but Gilson rejected the offer. Gilson accused Sanders of being anti-business and fiscally irresponsible, claiming that after-school programs Sanders had started were too expensive.

Stephany attempted to distance herself from the mayoralty of Gordon Paquette, which was seen as old-fashioned and unpopular; her campaign frequently stressed Sanders' poor relations with the Burlington board of aldermen, claiming that this made him an ineffective legislator. In spite of her generally liberal record, Stephany was opposed to abortion, which drew ire to her campaign from the feminist movement.

== Polling ==
Poll source	Poll sample	Sanders	Stephany	Gilson	Undecided
WDOT	400 people	33.75%'	17.00%	10.00%	39.75%
WDOT	400 people	41.75%'	22.50%	11.75%	-
Straw poll	380 people	50.50%'	11.60%	10.00%	27.90%
Straw poll	380 people	53.70%'	13.70%	11.60%	21.00%

== Endorsements ==
James Gilson (R)

Statewide officials

- Stephan A. Morse, Speaker of the Vermont House of Representatives

State officials

- George Coy, state senator and chairman of the Vermont Republican Party
- Helen Riehle, state representative
Bernie Sanders (I)

Labor unions

- American Federation of State, County and Municipal Employees

Organizations

- Citizens Party
Judith Stephany (D)

State officials

- Brian D. Burns, former Lieutenant Governor of Vermont
- Philip H. Hoff, former Governor of Vermont

Local officials

- Francis J. Cain, former Mayor of Burlington

Newspapers and publications

- The Burlington Free Press

== Results ==
1983 Burlington, Vermont mayoral election
Party	Candidate	Votes	%	±%
Independent	Bernie Sanders (incumbent)	6,942	52.12%	+8.29%
Democratic	Judith Stephany	4,086	30.68%	−13.04%
Republican	James Gilson	2,292	17.21%	+17.21%
Total votes		13,320	100.00%	

=== Results by ward ===
Ward	Sanders	Votes	Stephany	Votes	Gilson	Votes	Total votes	Votes
Ward 1	57.83%	1,067	29.65%	547	12.52%	231	100.00%	1,845
Ward 2	67.71%	1,210	21.66%	387	10.63%	190	100.00%	1,787
Ward 3	69.83%	1,222	22.46%	393	7.71%	135	100.00%	1,750
Ward 4	37.91%	1,394	42.21%	1,552	19.88%	731	100.00%	3,677
Ward 5	48.93%	1,007	32.41%	667	18.66%	384	100.00%	2,058
Ward 6	47.30%	1,042	24.51%	540	28.19%	621	100.00%	2,203

=== Reactions ===
Stephany stated that her late entry into the election had contributed to her defeat, while Gilson's poor result was attributed to him being uncharismatic and a generally poor campaigner. Governor of Vermont Richard Snelling, when asked about the result, attributed Sanders' victory to Stephany and Gilson adopting negative campaigns, which were traditionally ineffective in Vermont. According to a survey of voters performed by political scientist Tom Rice in 1985, support for Sanders was strongest among working-class voters, with people making under $20,000 a year supporting him at significantly higher rates than those making above $20,000 a year.
