= Edward A. Keenan =

American politician (1894–1970)

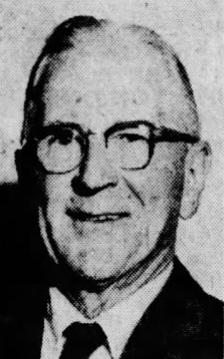
- Keenan in 1963

34th Mayor of Burlington
- In office June 3, 1963 – June 7, 1965
- Preceded by: Robert K. Bing
- Succeeded by: Francis J. Cain

Member of the Burlington, Vermont Board of Aldermen
- In office June 1, 1959 – June 3, 1963
- Preceded by: Paul L. Heininger
- Succeeded by: Richard J. Bove

Personal details
- Born: October 15, 1894 Oswego, New York
- Died: April 12, 1970 (aged 75) Pompano Beach, Florida
- Party: Republican
- Spouse: Marjorie Cooper
- Children: 2
- Parents: Edward A. Keenan (father); Bessie Winfred (mother)
- Education: University of Vermont

Edward A. Keenan (October 15, 1894 – April 12, 1970) was an American politician who served as the 34th Mayor of Burlington, Vermont. Keenan was the last Republican elected to the mayoralty of Burlington until Peter C. Brownell was thirty years later.

== Life ==
On October 15, 1894, Keenan was born in Oswego, New York, to Edward and Bessie Keenan. He attended both Oswego High School and later the University of Vermont. On June 1, 1916, he married Marjorie B. Cooper in Oswego and later had two children with her. In 1929 he moved his family to Montpelier and then to Burlington.

After retiring in 1959 from his position as an office manager with Green Mountain Power, Keenan was elected as an alderman from ward five in Burlington, narrowly defeating Democratic incumbent Paul L. Heininger with 382 votes to Heininger's 353. In 1961 he easily won reelection with 451 votes against Charles A. Brunnelle's 232 votes.

In 1963 incumbent Mayor Robert K. Bing announced that he would not seek a second term and party officials asked Keenan to run for mayor, but refused to make a decision until January 30, 1963, when he announced that he would run and received Bing's endorsement. On February 8, 1963, he was given the Republican nomination and on March 5 defeated Robert W. Larrow with 4,475 votes against Larrow's 4,267 votes. During his tenure he supported the city government using a weak-mayor system rather than a strong-mayor system.

On January 15, 1965, he announced that he would seek reelection and the Republican Committee in Burlington announced that it had voted unanimously to support him. On March 2 he was defeated by alderman Francis J. Cain with 5,520 votes for Cain against Keenan's 3,447 votes. After losing reelection he was invited to a briefing with President Lyndon B. Johnson along with the mayors of every city with over 100,000 people to discuss how the cities were coping with the Johnson administration's programs. In May he was a member of a four person delegation supported a bill in the state legislature that would reapportion the state house to 150 seats which was successfully passed.

Following his defeat for reelection as mayor he led a successful write-in campaign for the Republican nomination, placing second out of eleven candidates, as one of six candidates for state senate seats. Keenan was unable to campaign for state senate due to being hospitalized and the initial results of the election showed him losing by one vote. Later recounts found an error in the vote totals that under-reported Hector Marcoux's total by 100 votes and after it was included gave him a lead of 101 votes against Keenan.

Shortly before his death Keenan lived in Sarasota, Florida, and on April 12, 1970, he died in Pompano Beach, Florida, from a heart attack after being taken to the hospital earlier that day. The city hall flag in Burlington was flown at half-staff until after his funeral services by the orders of Francis J. Cain.
