= Vermont Progressive Party =

Social democratic third party in Vermont

- Chairperson: Cindy Weed
- Secretary: Elijah Bergman
- Vice Chair: Adam Norton
- Treasurer: Chris Szczerba
- Assistant Treasurer: Kit Andrews
- House Leader: Kate Logan
- Founded: 1980 Independent Coalition; 1983 Progressive Coalition; 1999–2000 Vermont Progressive Party
- Split from: Citizens Party; Liberty Union Party; Democratic Party
- Preceded by: Franklin County Independent Coalition; Citizens Party; Liberty Union Party
- Headquarters: Montpelier, Vermont
- Youth wing: Progressive Youth Caucus
- Ideology: Democratic socialism; Social democracy; Progressivism (US); Environmentalism
- Political position: Left-wing
- Colors: Red
- Statewide Offices: 1 / 6
- Vermont Senate: 1 / 30
- Vermont House of Representatives: 7 / 150
- Elected County Judges: 1 / 42
- Countywide Offices: 1 / 42
- Mayorships: 1 / 8
- Burlington, Vermont City Council: 5 / 12
- Other local offices: 20 (October 2026)

Website
- progressiveparty.org

The Vermont Progressive Party, formerly the Progressive Coalition and Independent Coalition, is a political party in the United States that is active in Vermont. It is the third-largest political party in Vermont behind the Democratic and Republican parties. As of 2026, the party has one member in the Vermont Senate and three members in the Vermont House of Representatives, as well as several more affiliated legislators who caucus with the Democratic Party.

The first members aligned with the party were elected to the state legislature in 1990. Prior to this, the last time a third party had members elected to the state legislature in Vermont was in 1917, with the election of James Lawson of the Socialist Party of America.

== History ==
=== Background ===
William H. Meyer, a member of the Democratic Party, was elected to the United States House of Representatives from Vermont's at-large congressional district after defeating Republican nominee Harold J. Arthur in the 1958 election. Meyer's victory was the first time since the 1853 election that the Republicans had lost a statewide election in Vermont. Meyer was the most left-wing member of Congress from 1937 to 2002, according to Keith T. Poole. He lost reelection in the 1960 election against Republican nominee Robert Stafford.

Meyer formed the Liberty Union Party at a meeting in his home with Peter Diamondstone, Dennis Morrisseau, and twenty other people on June 27, 1970. Martha Abbott, a future chair of the Vermont Progressive Party, was one of the members of the Liberty Union Party's founding meeting. Bernie Sanders joined the party in 1971, and was selected to serve as the party's candidate for a Senatorial special election at his first meeting. During his time in the party, Sanders also ran for United States Senate in the 1974 election and for Governor in the 1972 and 1976 elections. Sanders left the Liberty Union Party on October 11, 1977.

=== Progressive Coalition ===
==== Sanders ====
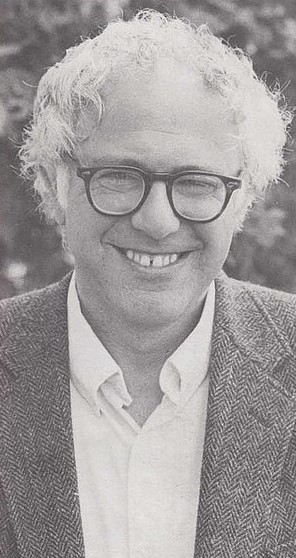
The Vermont Progressive Party originated under Mayor Bernie Sanders as the Independent Coalition during his 1981 mayoral campaign and then as the Progressive Coalition during his tenure as mayor.

On November 8, 1980, Sanders announced that he would run for mayor of Burlington, Vermont, in the 1981 election and formally announced his campaign on December 16, at a press conference in city hall. Sanders had been convinced to run for the mayoralty by Richard Sugarman, an Orthodox Jewish scholar at the University of Vermont, who had shown Sanders a ward-by-ward breakdown of the 1976 gubernatorial election which showed Sanders receiving 12% of the vote in Burlington despite only getting 6% statewide. Sanders defeated incumbent Democratic Mayor Gordon Paquette by ten votes in the election. Sanders was reelected as mayor in the 1983, 1985, and 1987 elections.

During his mayoral campaign, Sanders formed the Independent Coalition which according to Richard Sartelle was to bring working people, students, college faculty, union members, and all independent-minded citizens together. Sartelle ran with the support of the Independent Coalition for a seat on the city council from the 4th district, but was defeated by the Republican nominee.

The Citizens Party attempted to have Greg Guma run with their nomination for mayor in 1981, but Guma declined as it would be "difficult to run against another progressive candidate" and the party instead endorsed Sanders. Terry Bouricius, a member of the Citizens Party, was elected to the city council from the 2nd district becoming the first member of the party elected to office in Vermont.

Following his victory in the 1981 election, Sanders faced difficulties with the city council; this was because 11 of the 13 members of the board of alderman opposing Sanders. The council would oppose measures proposed by Sanders and override his vetoes on legislation. Bouricius and Sadie White were the only members of the city council aligned with Sanders.

During the 1982 elections, Sanders endorsed Citizens nominees Richard Musty and Zoe Breiner, and independent candidate Gary DeCarolis for city council and all of them won causing the council to have five pro-Sanders members, five Republican members, and three Democratic members. However, the Republicans and Democratic members of the city council united to select Robert Paterson, a Republican, as president of the city council instead of Sadie White, a Sanders supporter, by a vote of eight to five after six ballots and to prevent the pro-Sanders members of the city council from receiving positions. Sanders stated that "Probably the Democrats feel more comfortable dealing with the Republicans than with us".

DeCarolis asked for members of the media to refer to him and other pro-Sanders members of the city council as the Progressive Coalition rather than as just Sanders supporters. An organizational meeting for Progressive Coalition, which was attended by over 100 people, was held on November 10, 1983. The Progressive Coalition was not a political party, but an organization that gave out endorsements.

During the 1984 elections, the Citizens Party only ran one candidate under its name and instead endorsed the Progressive Coalition candidates. Bouricius stated that the Citizens Party was the core of the coalition, but that the coalition was being built broader than the Citizens Party. The Progressive Coalition gained one seat from the Democratic Party during the 1984 city council elections bringing the composition of the city council to six Progressive members, five Republican members, and two Democratic members. The Citizens Party of Vermont disbanded in 1986.

The Progressive Coalition supported Jesse Jackson during the 1984 Democratic presidential primaries and later supported Walter Mondale in the presidential election in the state.

Bouricius was selected to serve as president of the city council after 31 ballots and served until 1985. Bouricius was the only member of the Progressive Coalition to serve as president during Sanders' administration. After the 1985 elections William Skelton, a Republican member of the city council, was selected to serve as president of the city council against the Progressive-backed Zoe Breiner as Bouricius had dropped out.

==== Clavelle ====
The Vermont Progressive Alliance was formed by members of the Progressive Coalition and Rainbow Coalition on May 19, 1990, at Montpelier High School and inspired by the New Democratic Party. The organization endorsed ten independent candidates for seats in the state legislature in the 1990 election. Terry Bouricius and Tom Smith, who were endorsed by the organization, were elected to the Vermont House of Representatives in the 1990 election becoming the first member of the Progressive Coalition to do so. The last time a third party had members elected to the state legislature in Vermont was in 1917, with the election of James Lawson of the Socialist Party of America. The Vermont Organizing Committee was formed in 1992, and was affiliated with the Vermont Progressive Alliance.

The Franklin County Independent Coalition was also formed in 1990, to support Sanders' campaign for a seat in the United States House of Representatives during the 1990 election. The organization was founded by independent candidates for seats in the state house and Neil Bean, who was an independent member of the St. Albans city council and also grew out of Jeff Weaver's campaign for mayor of St. Albans and Jerry Colby's 1988 and 1990 campaigns for a seat in the Vermont Senate.

The Progressives regained control of the city council in 1994, with five of their members winning and three independents caucusing with them. The coalition expanded to Brattleboro, Vermont, with Shoshana Rihn's election to the town's select board in 1998. Rihn was sworn in, but was removed from office after a recount reported her losing by two votes.

=== Vermont Progressive Party ===
==== Clavelle ====
The coalition started holding caucuses in 25 towns in October 1999, to form a political party. The Vermont Progressive Party was formally created after organizing in 16 communities and held its first convention on July 9, 2000. Anthony Pollina received the party's gubernatorial nomination for the 2000 election and received 9.6% of the vote, more than the 5% needed for major party status.

==== Post-Kiss ====
Emma Mulvaney-Stanak was the only Progressive member of the 14-member city council following the resignation of Marisa Caldwell in 2010, which was the lowest number for the party since 1981. The party ran and received its highest number of candidates, votes, and share of seats in the state house in the 2016 election with seven out of twenty candidates winning with a combined total of 18,954 votes.

David Zuckerman was elected lieutenant governor after he used electoral fusion to receive both the Democratic and Progressive nominations.

Robin Chesnut-Tangerman, the leader of the Progressive caucus in the state house, lost reelection in 2020. Mollie Burke and Heather Surprenant did not seek reelection with the Progressive ballot line in the 2022 state house elections and solely ran as Democrats. The 2022 elections, in which the party lost two state house and one state senate seat, resulted in the entire Progressive delegation being solely from Chittenden County for the first time since 2004. Zuckerman returned to the lieutenant governorship in the concurrent election.

== Platform ==
The Progressive Party encompasses a progressive platform. The party's main focus has historically been advocacy for a single-payer health care system, which supported the implementation of Green Mountain Care, a health care program that was pushed by Democratic Governor Peter Shumlin due to pressure from the Progressive Party. Other major policy platforms are renewable energy programs and a phase-out of nuclear energy, public transportation proposals including one for a high-speed rail system, criminal justice reforms directed at reducing the state's prison population and better protecting convicts' rights, the creation of programs to end homelessness in the state, ending the war on drugs and repealing No Child Left Behind and ending the focus on standardized testing in the school system. The party also has an anti-war stance, advocating for Vermont's national guard to be restricted from engaging in war zones outside the United States, an end to the wars in Iraq and Afghanistan and opposition to all preemptive wars, strikes, or other offensive or interventionist military actions. The party is very supportive of LGBT rights and members of the party were involved in the legalization of same-sex marriage in the state.

Economically, the party also calls for converting the minimum wage to a living wage and having it tied to inflation rates, having the economy focus on small and local businesses, empowerment of worker cooperatives and publicly owned companies as democratic alternatives to multi-national corporations and to decentralize the economy, for the strengthening of state law to protect the right to unionize, for implementing a progressive income tax and repealing the Capital Gains Tax Exemption and residential education property tax, and for all trade to be subject to international standards on human rights. The party is also critical of privatization.

== Electoral history ==
=== Presidential ===
President
Election year	Vote percentage	+/–	Votes	Presidential candidate	Vice presidential candidate	Result	Reference
1984	40.83 / 100	Steady	95,730	Walter Mondale	Geraldine Ferraro	Lost	
2000	6.92 / 100	Steady	20,374	Ralph Nader	Winona LaDuke	Lost	

=== State legislature ===
Vermont House of Representatives
Election year	Votes	No. of candidates	No. of overall seats won	+/–	Reference
1992	7,389	8	2 / 150	Steady	
1994	3,337	6	2 / 150	Steady	
1996	3,937	4	3 / 150	▲1	
1998	2,565	5	4 / 150	▲1	
2000	7,925	10	4 / 150	Steady	
2002	4,287	10	4 / 150	Steady	
2004	12,039	11	6 / 150	▲2	
2006	14,135	17	6 / 150	Steady	
2008	13,774	12	5 / 150	▼1	
2010	7,563	11	5 / 150	Steady	
2012	10,284	11	5 / 150	Steady	
2014	8,321	13	6 / 150	▲1	
2016	18,954	20	7 / 150	▲1	
2018	21,420	17	7 / 150	Steady	
2020	20,362	14	7 / 150	Steady	
2022	9,740	10	6 / 150	▼1	
2024	9,740	10	4 / 150	▼2	

=== Burlington ===
Year	Burlington City Council	Mayor	Ref	Control
1982	5 / 13	Bernie Sanders		Republican
1983	5 / 13	Bernie Sanders		Republican
1984	6 / 13	Bernie Sanders		Progressive
1985	6 / 13	Bernie Sanders		Republican
1994	5 / 13	did not control		Progressive
1995	5 / 13	Peter Clavelle		Progressive
1996	5 / 13	Peter Clavelle		Progressive
1997	5 / 13	Peter Clavelle		Progressive
1998	5 / 13	Peter Clavelle		Progressive
1999	5 / 13	Peter Clavelle		Progressive
2000	5 / 13	Peter Clavelle		Progressive
2001	6 / 13	Peter Clavelle		Progressive
2002	5 / 13	Peter Clavelle		Progressive
2022	6 / 12	did not control		Progressive
2024	5 / 12	Emma Mulvaney-Stanak		Democratic
2026	5 / 12	Emma Mulvaney-Stanak		Democratic

== Elected officials ==
=== State ===
==== Statewide office ====
- David Zuckerman (P/D), Lieutenant Governor of Vermont (2017–2021); (2023–2025)
- Doug Hoffer (D/P), Vermont Auditor of Accounts (2013–present)

==== Vermont Senate ====
- President pro tempore Tim Ashe (D/P), Chittenden, with 5 others (3 D, 1 D/P, 1 P/D) (2009–2021)
- Senator Philip Baruth (D/P) Chittenden with 5 others (3 D, 1 D/P, 1 P/D) (2011–present)
- Senator Cheryl Hooker (D/P) Rutland with 2 others (2 R) (2019–present)
- Senator Tanya Vyhovsky (P/D), Chittenden, with 5 others (3 D, 2 D/P) (2017–present)
- Senator Andrew Perchlik (D/P), Washington, with 2 others (1 D, 1 P/D) (2019–present)
- Senator Anthony Pollina (P/D), Washington, with 2 others (1 D, 1 D/P) (2011–2023)

==== Vermont House of Representatives ====
- Rep. Mollie Burke (P), Windham-3-2, single member district (2009–present)
- Rep. Robin Chesnut-Tangerman (P), Rutland-Bennington, single member district (2015–present)
- Rep. Brian Cina (P), Chittenden-6-4, with 1 (P) (2017–present)
- Rep. Selene Colburn (P), Chittenden-6-4, with 1 (P) (2017–present)
- Rep. Mari Cordes (D/P), Addison-4, with 1 (D) (2019–present)
- Rep. Diana Gonzalez (P), Chittenden-6-7, with 1 (D) (2015–present)
- Rep. Sandy Haas (P), Windsor-Rutland-2, single member district (2005–present)
- Rep. Zachariah Ralph (P), Windsor-1, with 1 (D) (2019–present)

=== County ===
- Chittenden County
  - Daniel L. Gamelin (D/P/R), High Bailiff (2011–present)
- Essex County
  - Vincent Illuzzi (R/P/D/L), State's Attorney (1999–present)
  - Trevor Colby (R/P), Sheriff (2011–present)
- Grand Isle County
  - Ray C. Allen (D/P/R), Sheriff (2015–present)
- Windham County
  - Alan Blood (P), Justice of the Peace, Putney, with 9 (8 D, 1 P) (2019–present)
  - Edith Gould (P), Justice of the Peace, Putney, with 9 (8 D, 1 P) (2017–present)
- Caledonia County
  - Christian Bradley Hubbs (P), Justice of the Peace, Burke, with 6 (2 R, 2 I, 2 D) (2019–present)

=== Municipal ===
==== City ====
- Burlington
  - City Council
    - Perri Freeman (Central District-Ward 2 & 3) (2019–present)
    - Jack Hanson (East District-Ward 1 & 8) (2019–present)
    - Zoraya Hightower (Ward 1) (2020–present)
    - Max Tracy (Ward 2) (2012–present)
    - Joe Magee (Ward 3) (2021–present)
    - Ali Dieng (D/P) (Ward 7) (2017–present)
    - Jane Stromberg (Ward 8) (2020–present)
  - Ward Clerk
    - Wendy Coe (Ward 2) (2010–present)
  - Ward Inspector
    - Jane Stromberg (Ward 1) (2019–present)
    - Alex Rose (Ward 2) (2019–present)
    - Kit Andrews (Ward 3) (2013–present)
    - Bonnie Filker (Ward 3) (2019–present)
- Montpelier
  - Mayor
    - Anne Watson (Note: Watson is officially elected to a non-partisan office; however, she is designated as a member of the party.) (2018–2022)

==== Town ====
- Springfield
  - Selectboard
    - Stephanie Thompson (2010–present)
- Fairlee
  - Zoning and Planning Administrator
    - John Christopher Brimmer (2012–present)
- Berlin
  - Selectboard
    - Jeremy Hansen (2013–present)
- Richmond
  - Selectboard
    - Steve May (2016–present)
- The party also has a significant number of its members elected to other local offices in town governments and appointed to serve as town officials. However, in Vermont these elections are non-partisan and no party name appears before their names on election ballots or during an appointment process.

== Party leaders ==
The most recent chair of the Vermont Progressive Party is Bill Hunsinger. He resigned in August, 2026.

State Senator and former Gubernatorial nominee and Congressional candidate Anthony Pollina, and the former vice-chair, Marielle Blais, lead the state party until 2025. Secretary Chris Brimmer, also the Chair of the Caledonia County Committee, served from 2009—2025. Will Anderson served as Treasurer 2023-2026. The past Treasurer is Robert Millar, who briefly served as Acting Chair in 2001, and past Assistant Treasurer is Martha Abbott previously served as Treasurer and twice as chair. After being in the position of Acting Chair while the State Committee was not formalized, Heather Riemer served as the party's first chair at its formation as a statewide party in 1999. The position of executive director was added in 2011. Previous Treasurer Robert Millar previously served as executive director from 2011 to 2015. Joshua Wronski was Executive Director from 2016–2025, the longest in party history. Heather Thomas served as Executive Director from 2025-2026, when she moved into the role of Director of Organizing. Meg Polyte became Executive Director in October 2026.

- Chair: Cindy Weed (2026 - present)
- Vice Chair: Adam Norton (2026 - present)
- Secretary: Elijah Bergman (2026 - present)
- Treasurer: Christopher Szczerba (2026 - present)
- Assistant Treasurer: Kit Andrews (2026 - present)
- Executive Director: Megan Polyte (2026 - present)
- Coordinating Committee:
  - Gene Bergman
  - Liz Blum
  - Kathy Shapiro
  - Jaiel Pulskamp
  - Jane Stromberg
  - Ethan Avendaño-Lawrence
  - Labor Advisor: Matt Gile
  - Regional Advisors:
    - Central: Tamara Morgan
    - Chittenden-Grand Isle: Robert Millar
    - Northern: Marilyn Hackett
    - Southeast: Eli Carini
    - Southwest: Marielle Blais

=== Timeline of party Chairs ===
#	Name	Term
–	Heather Riemer; Acting	1995–1999
1	Heather Riemer	1999–2001
–	Robert Millar; Acting	2001
2	Martha Abbott	2001–2005
3	Marrisa S. Caldwell	2005–2007
4	Anthony Pollina	2007–2009
5	Martha Abbott	2009–2013
6	Emma Mulvaney-Stanak	2013–2017
7	Anthony Pollina	2017–2025
8	Bill Hunsinger	2025–2026
9	Cindy Weed	2026 - present

== See also ==
- Progressive Party (United States, 1912) (Bull Moose Party)
- Progressive Party (United States, 1924–1934)
- National Progressives of America
- Progressive Party (United States, 1948–1955)
- California Progressive Party
- Oregon Progressive Party
- Washington Progressive Party
- Wisconsin Progressive Party

== Works cited ==
- Johnson, Bertram (2020). Beyond Donkeys and Elephants: Minor Political Parties in Contemporary American Politics. University Press of Kansas. doi:10.2307/j.ctv15tt76n. ISBN 978-0-7006-2929-9.
