= 1981 Burlington, Vermont mayoral election =

- March 3, 1981
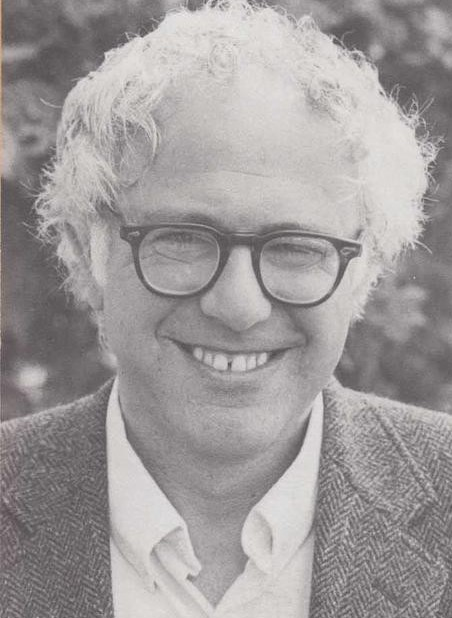

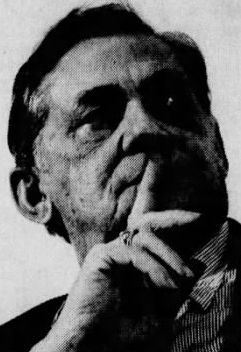

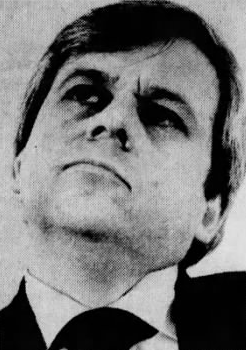
Nominee	Bernie Sanders	Gordon Paquette	Richard Bove
Party	Independent	Democratic	Independent
Popular vote	4,330	4,320	1,091
Percentage	43.83%	43.72%	11.04%
- Results by city council district before recount Sanders: Sanders—40–50% Sanders—50–60% Paquette: Paquette—40–50%
Mayor of Burlington before election
Gordon Paquette
Democratic
Elected Mayor of Burlington
Bernie Sanders
Independent

The 1981 Burlington mayoral election was held March 3, 1981. Bernie Sanders, who ran as an independent candidate, defeated incumbent Democratic Mayor Gordon Paquette, who was seeking a sixth term as Mayor of Burlington, Vermont, and Richard Bove.

Paquette had easily won reelection to the mayoralty in the 1973, 1975, and 1979 elections and the Democratic Party controlled ten of the thirteen city council seats. Sanders ran in the election due to the amount of support he received in Burlington during his 1976 gubernatorial campaign. Bove initially ran as a Democrat, but became an independent after losing in the primary to Paquette. The Republican Party did not field a candidate and the Citizens Party endorsed Sanders after failing to run Greg Guma. Sanders initially led Paquette by twenty-two votes, but his total vote lead was later decreased to ten votes following a recount.

Sanders' victory was the first time a socialist was elected mayor of a jurisdiction in New England since the election of Jasper McLevy as mayor of Bridgeport, Connecticut during the 1950s. Sanders would later be reelected as mayor in the 1983, 1985, and 1987 elections before being elected to the United States House of Representatives in 1990 and then the United States Senate in 2006.

== Background ==
Gordon Paquette, a member of the city council, won election to the mayoralty of Burlington, Vermont, with the Democratic nomination in the 1971 election. Paquette was reelected as mayor in the 1973, 1975, 1977, and 1979 elections with him taking over seventy percent of the popular vote in each election except in 1977. After the 1980 elections the Democratic Party controlled ten of the thirteen city council seats.

== Campaign ==
=== Candidates ===
==== Democratic ====
Paquette announced on January 6, 1981, that he would seek reelection to a sixth term. Richard Bove, a former member of the Burlington Board of Alderman and a member of Burlington's Fire Commission, announced on January 16, that he would seek the Democratic nomination for mayor against Paquette. Bove's decision to run was inspired by discontent with Paquette's raise of taxes, as well as a perceived lack of benefits from Burlington's "urban renewal" projects. Paquette defeated Bove for the Democratic nomination by a vote of 133 to 19.

==== Republican ====
The Republican Party did not run a candidate in the 1979 mayoral election, after unsuccessfully asking former Chief of Police Robert G. Abare and state Representative Theodore M. Riehle III to run.

==== Other candidates ====
Bernie Sanders announced on November 8, 1980, that he would seek the mayoral office and formally announced his campaign on December 16, at a press conference in city hall. Sanders had been convinced to run for the mayoralty by Richard Sugarman, an Orthodox Jewish scholar at the University of Vermont, had shown Sanders a ward-by-ward breakdown of the 1976 Vermont gubernatorial election, in which Sanders had run, which showed him receiving 12% of the vote in Burlington despite only getting 6% statewide. Sanders selected Linda Niedweske to serve as his campaign manager. The Citizens Party attempted to have Greg Guma run with their nomination for mayor, but Guma declined as it would be "difficult to run against another progressive candidate". The party did not run a candidate, instead endorsing Sanders.

After losing the Democratic primary, Bove announced that he would seek the mayoral office as an independent candidate. Joseph McGrath, a retired building superintendent, also filed to run as an independent candidate.

=== Results and demographics ===
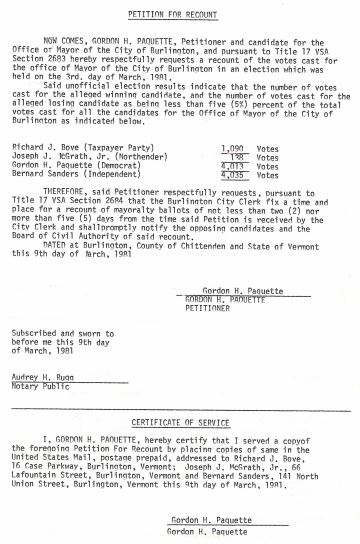
Mayor Gordon Paquette's recount petition

Though The Burlington Free Press had projected that Paquette would win by over thirty percentage points, Sanders was elected mayor at the March 3 general election. He was initially declared the victor by a margin of twenty-two votes over Paquette, but the lead was later reduced to ten votes after a recount. His campaign spent around $4,000. Paquette did not contest the results of the recount. On April 6, Sanders was sworn in as Mayor of Burlington, becoming the first socialist mayor in New England since Jasper McLevy in Bridgeport, Connecticut during the 1940s and 1950s.

Paquette's loss of the election was attributed to his own shortcomings. He did not actively campaign, as he did not consider Sanders and Bove serious challengers, with Sanders having never previously won an election. Paquette was also considered to have lost because he proposed an unpopular 65 cent per $100 raise in taxes that Sanders opposed. There was also a significant student population in Burlington caused by the University of Vermont ending the building of dormitories in 1972.

Murray Bookchin and his friends supported Sanders and Bookchin claimed that Sanders won due to "ten anarchist votes" and that he personally knew those voters.

== Results ==
1981 Burlington, Vermont mayoral election
Party	Candidate	Votes	%	±%
Independent	Bernie Sanders	4,330	43.83%	+43.83%
Democratic	Gordon Paquette (incumbent)	4,320	43.72%	−54.98%
Independent	Richard Bove	1,091	11.04%	+11.04%
Independent	Joseph McGrath	139	1.41%	+1.41%
Total votes		9,880	100.00%	

=== Results by ward before recount ===
Ward	Sanders	Votes	Paquette	Votes	Bove	Votes	McGrath	Votes	Total votes	Votes
Ward 1	44.33%	516	43.30%	504	11.43%	133	0.95%	11	100.00%	1,164
Ward 2	53.29%	616	30.97%	358	14.79%	171	0.95%	11	100.00%	1,156
Ward 3	49.08%	639	35.18%	458	13.13%	171	2.61%	34	100.00%	1,302
Ward 4	36.69%	1,045	48.10%	1,370	13.52%	385	1.69%	48	100.00%	2,848
Ward 5	41.75%	610	43.60%	637	13.35%	195	1.30%	19	100.00%	1,461
Ward 6	43.07%	609	48.51%	686	7.36%	104	1.06%	15	100.00%	1,414

== Endorsements ==
Gordon Paquette

Statewide officials

- Philip H. Hoff, Governor of Vermont (1963–1969)

Newspapers

- The Burlington Free Press
Bernie Sanders

Individuals

- George Albee, Professor of Psychology at the University of Vermont and former President of the American Psychological Association
- Huck Gutman, Professor of English at the University of Vermont
- Richard Sugarman, Assistant Professor of Religion at the University of Vermont

Organizations

- Burlington Police Patrolmen's Association
- Citizens Party

== Works cited ==
- Biehl, Janet (2015). Ecology or Catastrophe: The Life of Murray Bookchin. Oxford University Press. ISBN 9780199342488.
- Conroy, W. (2016). Bernie Sanders and the Boundaries of Reform: Socialism in Burlington. Temple University Press. doi:10.2307/j.ctvrdf3gv. ISBN 978-1-4399-1481-6.
