= 1987 Burlington, Vermont mayoral election =

- March 3, 1987
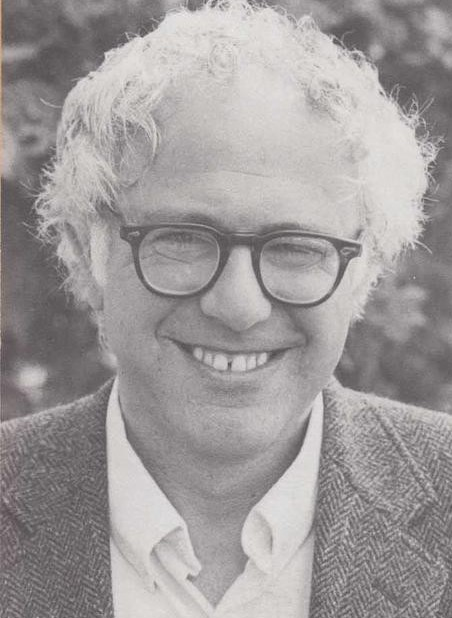

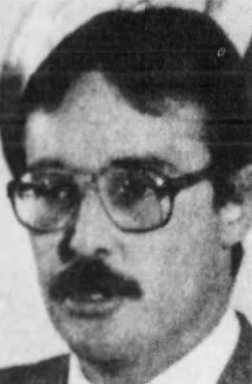
Nominee	Bernie Sanders	Paul Lafayette
Party	Independent	Democratic
Popular vote	6,759	5,335
Percentage	55.23%	44.77%
- Results by city council district Sanders: Sanders—50–60% Sanders—60–70% Lafayette: Lafayette—50–60%
Mayor of Burlington before election
Bernie Sanders
Independent
Elected Mayor of Burlington
Bernie Sanders
Independent

The 1987 Burlington, Vermont mayoral election was held on March 3, 1987. Incumbent Mayor Bernie Sanders won election to his fourth and final term as mayor with 55.23% of the popular vote against Democratic nominee Paul Lafayette, a member of the city council.

Sanders ran his final independent campaign for mayor stating that he would not seek reelection to another term after 1987. The Democratic Party selected Lafayette against Caryl Stewart while the Republican Party did not run a candidate.

== Campaign ==
=== Independent ===
Incumbent Mayor Bernie Sanders, who had recently came in third in the 1986 Vermont gubernatorial election, announced on December 1, 1986, that he would seek reelection to a fourth term as Mayor of Burlington, Vermont, despite close associates stating that he was tired of being mayor. Sanders stated that he would not seek another mayoral term after the 1987 election stating that "eight years is enough and I think it is time for new leadership, which does exist within the coalition, to come up". During the campaign Sanders raised $37,480, spent $37,034, and had remaining debts of $2,020.

=== Democratic ===
Caryl Stewart, who unsuccessfully sought a seat in the Burlington city council from the 3rd ward, and Paul Lafayette, who served as a member of the city council from the 5th ward, stated on August 24, 1986, that they were considering running for the Democratic mayoral nomination. Stewart announced her mayoral campaign on September 16, and Lafayette announced his campaign on December 2. Lafayette defeated Stewart for the Democratic nomination with 636 votes to Stewart's 240.

=== Republican ===
Frederick Bailey, a member of the Burlington city council, was considered as a possible nominee for the Republicans, but later announced that he would not run. The Republicans did not select a candidate to run in the mayoral election.

== Results ==
Sanders notably won the 5th ward, which at the time was represented by Lafayette.

1987 Burlington, Vermont mayoral election
Party	Candidate	Votes	%	±%
Independent	Bernie Sanders (incumbent)	6,901	55.23%	−0.09%
Democratic	Paul Lafayette	5,594	44.77%	+13.32%
Total votes		12,495	100.00%	

=== Results by ward ===
Ward	Sanders	Votes	Lafayette	Votes	Total votes	Votes
Ward 1	63.16%	1,106	36.84%	645	100.00%	1,751
Ward 2	67.82%	1,140	32.18%	541	100.00%	1,681
Ward 3	64.50%	1,050	35.50%	578	100.00%	1,628
Ward 4	43.63%	1,547	56.37%	1,999	100.00%	3,546
Ward 5	50.02%	1,041	49.98%	1,040	100.00%	2,081
Ward 6	56.25%	1,017	43.75%	791	100.00%	1,808

== Endorsements ==
Sanders Endorsements

Newspapers

- The Burlington Free Press

== Works cited ==
- Conroy, W. (2016). Bernie Sanders and the Boundaries of Reform: Socialism in Burlington. Temple University Press. doi:10.2307/j.ctvrdf3gv. ISBN 978-1-4399-1481-6.
