= 2024 Burlington, Vermont mayoral election =

2024 Burlington mayoral election
- March 5, 2024
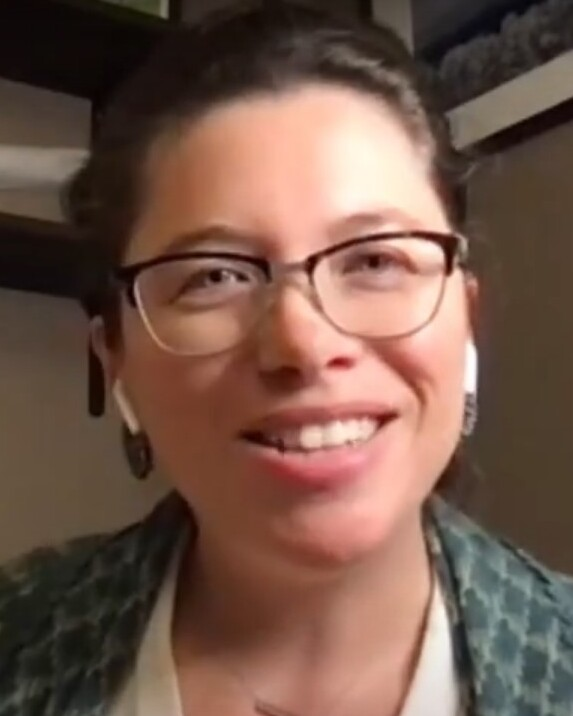

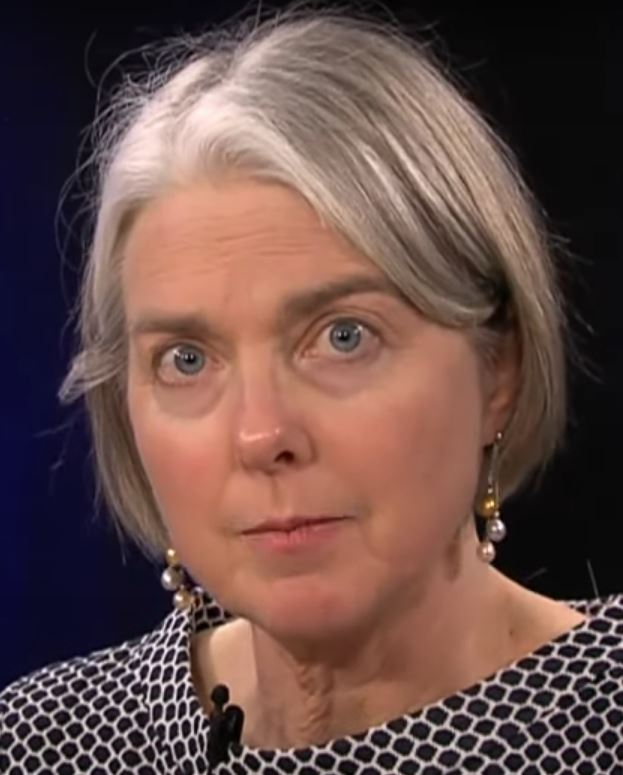
Nominee	Emma Mulvaney-Stanak	Joan Shannon
Party	Progressive	Democratic
Popular vote	7,612	6,696
Percentage	51.4%	45.2%
- Results by ward Mulvaney-Stanak: 60–70% 70–80% Shannon: 50–60% 60–70%
Mayor before election
Miro Weinberger
Democratic
Elected mayor
Emma Mulvaney-Stanak
Progressive

The 2024 Burlington mayoral election was held on March 5, 2024. It elected the mayor of Burlington, Vermont. Incumbent Democratic mayor Miro Weinberger declined to seek re-election.

City councilor Joan Shannon defeated CD Mattison and Karen Paul for the Democratic nomination. The Vermont Progressive Party nominated state representative Emma Mulvaney-Stanak.

In the general election, Mulvaney-Stanak prevailed, defeating Shannon and two independent candidates. Mulvaney-Stanak became Burlington's first female and first openly LGBT mayor, as well as being the first Progressive to serve as mayor of Burlington since Bob Kiss left office in 2012.

== Background ==
Miro Weinberger's victory in the 2012 mayoral election made him the first Democrat to serve as Burlington's mayor since Gordon Paquette lost re-election to Bernie Sanders in the 1981 election. Weinberger was re-elected in 2015, 2018, and 2021. Weinberger is the longest serving consecutive mayor in Burlington history and second-longest serving overall after Peter Clavelle.

The Democrats won a majority on the city council in the 2023 elections; previously, the Progressive Party held a plurality of seats on the council.

This was the first Burlington mayoral election to use ranked-choice voting since the 2009 mayoral election. Voters approved a referendum to re-adopt the system for mayoral races in the 2023 election, despite opposition from Weinberger. Kurt Wright, the last Republican to serve on the Burlington city council and a former mayoral candidate, argued that the use of ranked-choice voting would help Republicans, as it meant a Republican could run for mayor and not "drain votes away from another candidate."

== Democratic caucus ==
On September 28, 2023, Weinberger announced that he would not seek reelection. The Democratic caucus was held on December 10.

=== Nominee ===
- Joan Shannon, city councilor and former council president

=== Eliminated at caucus ===
- CD Mattison, nonprofit executive and former vice chair of the Burlington Democratic Party
- Karen Paul, city council president

=== Declined ===
- Miro Weinberger, incumbent mayor

=== Endorsements ===
Karen Paul

Statewide officials

- Howard Dean, former governor of Vermont and former chair of the Democratic National Committee

State legislators

- Philip Baruth, president pro tempore of the Vermont Senate

Local officials

- Sarah Carpenter, Burlington city councilor
Joan Shannon

Local officials

- Dave Hartnett, former Burlington city councilor
- Jane Knodell, former Burlington city councilor (Progressive)

Labor unions

- Burlington Firefighters Association (IAFF Local 1552)
- Burlington Police Officers’ Association

=== Results ===
Democratic caucus results
Party	Candidate	Votes	%
Democratic	Joan Shannon	1,689	50.68
Democratic	Karen Paul	1,173	35.19
Democratic	CD Mattison	471	14.13
Total votes		3,333	100.00

== Progressive caucus ==
The Progressive caucus was held on December 7, 2023.

=== Nominee ===
- Emma Mulvaney-Stanak, leader of the Progressive caucus in the Vermont House of Representatives, former Burlington city councilor, and former chair of the Vermont Progressive Party

=== Declined ===
- Zoraya Hightower, city councilor
- Joe Magee, city councilor
- Max Tracy, former city council president and nominee for mayor in 2021 (endorsed Mulvaney-Stanak)

=== Endorsements ===
Emma Mulvaney-Stanak

Local officials

- Max Tracy, former city council president and nominee for mayor in 2021

== Republican caucus ==
The Republican caucus was held on December 19, 2023. No candidate was nominated for the mayoral race.

=== Declined ===
- Kurt Wright, former state representative, former Burlington city council president, and nominee for mayor in 2009 and 2012

== Independents ==
=== Declared ===
- Will Emmons, former arbitration advocate for the American Postal Workers Union and candidate for mayor in 2021
- Chris Haessly, former Burlington School Committee member

== General election ==
=== Endorsements ===
Endorsements in bold were made after the caucuses.

Joan Shannon (D)

Local officials

- Dave Hartnett, former city councilor
- Jane Knodell, former city councilor (Progressive)
- **Adam Roof**, chair of the Burlington Democratic Party and former city councilor

Labor unions

- **AFSCME Local 1343 (Note: City of Burlington Municipal Employees)**
- Burlington Firefighters Association (IAFF Local 1552)
- Burlington Police Officers’ Association
- **International Brotherhood of Electrical Workers Local 300**
Emma Mulvaney-Stanak (P)

State legislators

- **Mark Larson**, former state representative (Democratic)

Local officials

- **Ali Dieng**, city councilor (Independent)
- Max Tracy, former city council president

Individuals

- **CD Mattison**, former vice chair of the Burlington Democratic Party and former 2023 mayoral candidate (Democratic)

Labor unions

- **AFSCME Local 1674 (Note: Howard Center Union)**

Organizations

- **LGBTQ Victory Fund**
- **LPAC**
- **Vote Mama**

=== Fundraising ===
Shannon raised $132,124 from 651 donors, spending around $60,000. Donors to her campaign include former Vermont Governor Howard Dean and former state Attorney General T.J. Donovan. Mulvaney-Stanak raised $67,052 from 514 donors, spending roughly $35,000. Donors included state Attorney General Charity Clark, city councilor Zoraya Hightower, and former city councilors Vince Brennan and Max Tracy.

=== Results ===
Voter turnout rose from 39% in 2021, to 47% in 2024, with every ward seeing its turnout rise. Mulvaney-Stanak's victory made her the first woman and openly LGBT person to be mayor.

Despite representing it on the city council, Shannon carried Ward 5 by a slim 1,185 to 1,075 margin. Progressive councilor Gene Bergman argued that Mulvaney-Stanak's performance in Ward 5 "speaks to the fact that we ran a campaign that reached those folks". Mulvaney-Stanak performed better than the Progressive candidates in every ward that elected a Democratic councilor. Jane Knodell, who worked as Shannon's treasurer, stated that Shannon lost due to discontent under Weinberger's tenure and Democrats holding the mayoralty for 12 years.

2024 Burlington mayoral election
Party	Candidate	Votes	%
**Progressive**	**Emma Mulvaney-Stanak**	**7,612**	**51.4%**
Democratic	Joan Shannon	6,696	45.2%
Independent	Will Emmons	273	1.8%
Independent	Chris Haessly	205	1.4%
Total votes		**14,786**	**100.00%**
Progressive **gain** from Democratic			

== Works cited ==
- Robinson, Shaun (March 8, 2024). "How did Emma Mulvaney-Stanak win Burlington — and how will she govern?". VTDigger. Archived from the original on February 22, 2025.
