= 2015 Burlington, Vermont mayoral election =

Burlington mayoral election
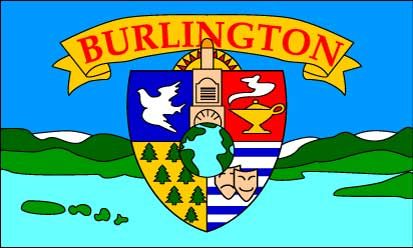
- March 3, 2015
- Turnout: 25.2%
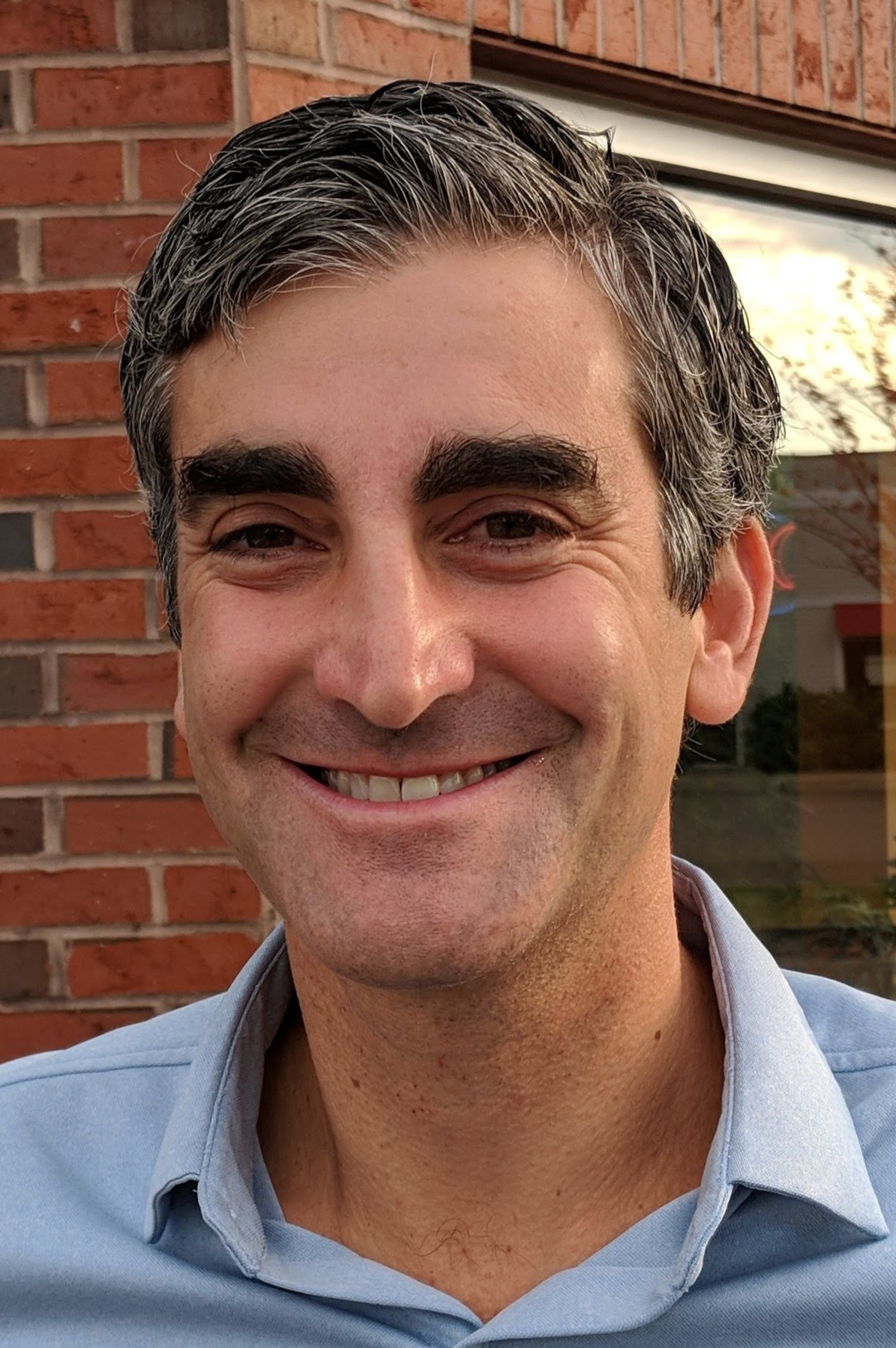

Nominee	Miro Weinberger	Steven Goodkind	Greg Guma
Party	Democratic	Progressive	Independent
Popular vote	5,241	1,716	508
Percentage	68.27%	22.35%	6.62%
- Results by ward Weinberger: 40–50% 50–60% 60–70% 70–80%
Mayor before election
Miro Weinberger
Democratic
Elected mayor
Miro Weinberger
Democratic

The 2015 Burlington mayoral election was held March 3, 2015. Incumbent mayor Miro Weinberger, a Democrat, was re-elected for a second 3-year term with 68.27% of the vote. The Progressive nominee, Steven Goodkind, came in a second distant place with 22.35% of the vote. Weinberger was also challenged by independent Greg Guma and Libertarian Loyal Ploof.

== Background ==
Miro Weinberger was elected mayor of Burlington in 2012, becoming the first Democrat to do so since 1981, when independent Bernie Sanders became mayor. Weinberg's first term was mainly focused on the need to balance the city's finances after Progressive Bob Kiss' mayorship. He reached a settlement with Citibank, that was suing the city for over $33 million over the mismanagement of Burlington Telecom, and in 2014 the city was in the black for the first time since 2009. However his plans to change zoning regulations in order revitalize Burlington's downtown faced criticism from progressives. They feared it would lead to gentrification as residents and business-owners could be priced-out. Weinberger eliminated the requirement for developments downtown to be half commercial and proposed to eliminate parking minimums, a decision ultimately rejected by city council.

== Campaign ==
The campaign was mainly focused on the mayor's plan to change various zoning and housing regulations in order to revitalize Burlington's downtown. Both Steven Goodkind (Progressive) and Greg Guma (Independent) warned that such policies could lead to gentrification and were worried that no enough was being done to guarantee affordable housing.

For his part, Weinberger criticized Goodkind's record as the former public works director and claimed that his views "represent a return to the failed leadership of the past". He defended his plans for downtown claiming that he has the will of the people behind him and that his past profession as a developer makes him best suited to "defend and promote the interest of Burlingtonians when we are working with other sophisticated financial parties."

== Election results ==
Burlington mayoral election, 2015
Party	Candidate	Votes	%
Democratic	Miro Weinberger	5,241	68.27%
Progressive	Steven Goodkind	1,716	22.35%
Independent	Greg Guma	508	6.62%
Libertarian	Loyal Ploof	162	2.11%
Write-in		50	0.65%
Total valid votes		7,677	100%
Invalid or blank votes		188	
Turnout		7,865	25.2%
Registered electors		31,195	
Democratic hold			

=== By ward ===
Ward	Weinberger (D)		Goodkind (P)		Guma (I)		Ploof (L)		Write-ins		Blank/invalid	Turnout	
Ward 1	69.1%	472	22.1%	151	7.3%	50	1.2%	8	0.3%	2	14	697	18.2%
Ward 2	51.6%	265	31.7%	163	15.0%	77	1.4%	7	0.4%	2	11	525	13.0%
Ward 3	52.7%	472	33.7%	302	11.1%	99	1.8%	16	0.7%	6	18	913	21.4%
Ward 4	74.0%	1,249	18.9%	319	4.0%	67	2.6%	44	0.6%	10	33	1,722	44.1%
Ward 5	70.3%	906	20.8%	268	6.2%	80	1.8%	23	0.9%	11	20	1,308	31.0%
Ward 6	76.2%	693	16.2%	147	5.8%	53	1.3%	12	0.4%	4	11	920	23.3%
Ward 7	73.6%	1,047	18.3%	260	4.2%	60	2.8%	40	1.1%	15	33	1,455	40.5%
Ward 8	49.5%	137	38.3%	106	7.9%	22	4.3%	12	-	0	48	325	9.6%
Citywide	68.3%	5,241	22.4%	1,716	6.6%	508	2.1%	162	0.7%	50	188	7,865	25.2%
