= Ali Dieng =

American politician

Member-elect of the Vermont House of Representatives from the Chittenden-18 district
- Assuming office January 2027
- Succeeding: Robert Hooper

Personal details
- Party: Democratic

Ali Dieng is an American politician. An immigrant from Mauritania, he started Parent University to teach immigrant families about childcare and served as Burlington School District's family outreach coordinator. He represented Ward 7 in Burlington City Council from 2018 to 2024, and ran as an independent candidate in the 2021 mayoral election. He is the Democratic member-elect of the Vermont House of Representatives from the Chittenden-18 district.

== Biography ==
Dieng was born in Mauritania and grew up in Senegal. Returning to Mauritania, Dieng taught at an elementary school, and was involved in grassroots organizing. In August 2008, he moved to Burlington "with nothing more than a suitcase in hand".

In 2007, Dieng emigrated to the United States to join his wife, who was studying at the School for International Training. In 2015, Dieng founded Parent University, a program that teaches immigrant American families about child safety regulations and life skills, inspired by his experiences of running a summer camp where he saw children from low-income backgrounds with little clothing or untreated injuries. He has also worked for the Burlington School District as their family outreach coordinator.

=== Burlington City Council ===
In 2017, Dieng ran as an independent candidate for the New North End Ward 7 seat in Burlington City Council in a special election, which had been triggered by the resignation of Tom Ayres. Despite initially being an independent candidate, he became the Democratic and Progressive nominee for the seat. During canvassing, he met senator Bernie Sanders, whom he later recalled was "almost like a prophet sent by God to make the world a better place". Endorsed by Sanders and Burlington mayor Miro Weinberger, he won the seat, receiving 610 votes. At the time, he was the city's only non-White council member.

While on the council, Dieng served on the Racial Equity Inclusion and Belonging Committee as chair. In November 2019, he opposed a resolution for non-citizen voting, calling voting rights "the only aspect that will push them to become citizen[s]". He supports police reform, but only in a proactive manner; in June 2020, amidst the George Floyd protests, he voted a measure against capping the number of police officers in the Burlington Police Department. In 2022, Dieng expressed interest in the council president position, on the grounds there should be a non-Democrat check on the mayor, but did not formally seek it, admitting he did not have the necessary support. He also introduced a resolution calling for a ceasefire in the Gaza War (as well as supporting the victims of the 2023 Vermont shooting of Palestinian students), stating that support for the ceasefire was "because Muslims and Jews in this community are living in fear"; it failed on a 6-6 tie.

Dieng was re-elected in 2018 and 2020. Originally part of the Progressive caucus, he left in March 2020 and became an independent, citing partisan divide as the reason. He was narrowly re-elected in 2022 by only two votes, requiring officials to certify the election at the Town Meeting Day. He did not run for re-election in 2024. In 2026, he applied for consideration for appointment to Robert Hooper's vacated House seat, but was passed over by Governor Phil Scott.

=== Political campaigns ===
Dieng endorsed Bernie Sanders' campaign in the 2020 Democratic Party presidential primaries. During the primaries, he showed New Yorker journalist Charles Bethea the trending switch of Pete Buttigieg supporters to Sanders, whom he saw as "our guy to beat Trump".

In March 2020, Dieng announced that he was interested in running in the 2021 mayoral election, and announced his campaign on December 7. His campaign promises included promoting tiny homes as a solution to homelessness, as well as a new Public Health Emergency Manager position. He finished in third place behind Weinberger, with 1,830 votes. He was part of Emma Mulvaney-Stanak's campaign in the 2024 mayoral election, which she eventually won.

=== Vermont House of Representatives ===
In June 2026, Dieng announced that he would run in the Vermont House of Representatives election for the Chittenden-18 district. He named education, healthcare, housing, and workforce development as campaign priorities. He won the general election in November, defeating independent candidate Dave Hartnett.

=== Personal life ===
Dieng lives in Burlington. In 2005, Dieng married Angela Smith-Dieng, a Peace Corps officer from northern New York she met. Dieng has two children.

Dieng is a keen soccer player, playing in the Elite 8 Soccer League. He also speaks four languages.
