= Burlington City Council (Vermont) =

Type
- Type: Unicameral

Leadership
- City Council President: Ben Traverse (D)

Structure
- Seats: 12
- Political groups: Democratic (6) Progressive (5) Independent (1)

Elections
- Voting system: First-past-the-post (until 2005, 2012–2022); Instant-runoff voting (2006–2011, 2022–)
- Last election: March 5, 2024

Meeting place
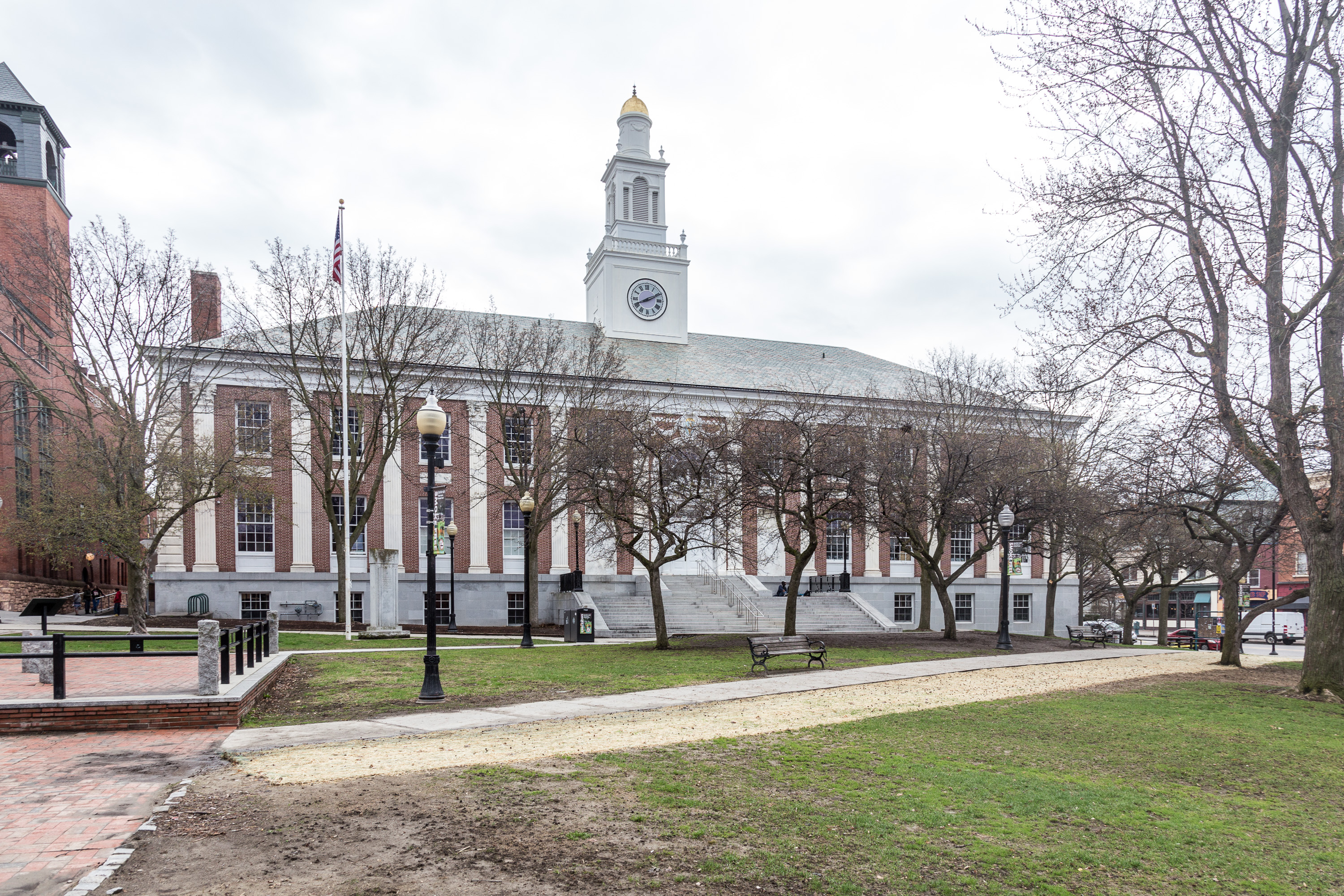
- Burlington City Hall in 2017

The Burlington City Council is the legislature of Burlington, Vermont, with the mayor as executive.

The city council has twelve seats, divided into eight ward seats, where councilors are elected in even years, and four district seats (Central, North, East, and South, overlaying two wards each), where councilors are elected in odd years. All councilors have two-year terms. The large transient student population votes in local, state, and national elections, resulting in a considerable impact on local elections.

The council is usually split between Democrats and Progressives. The current composition of the council, following the 2024 municipal elections, is: six Democrats, five Progressives, and one independent. Ben Traverse, a Democrat, is the current Council President.

== History ==
Burlington has had a mayor–council form of government since 1865 with its first mayor being Albert L. Catlin.

The city signed up 2,527 new voters in the six weeks from September 1, 2008, the highest number for that time frame in over nine years.

Prior to 2020, the council's twelve seats were occupied by five Progressives, four Democrats, two Independents, and one Republican. After the 2020 city elections, the Republican seat flipped to Democratic, and one Independent seat flipped to Progressive.

In March 2021, Burlington residents voted to implement ranked-choice voting for city councilors. It passed with 64% support. Before the amendment could go into effect, however, it had to be passed by the state legislature and approved by the governor. The state house approved the amendment on February 23, 2022, sending it to the state senate. The senate passed the bill on April 5, and the governor approved it on April 20.

Despite the fact that Progressives held a majority on the council, Democrat Karen Paul was elected council president in 2022. The role of council president is largely ceremonial, and outgoing council president Max Tracy remarked that the position brings little actual power. Zoraya Hightower, then the de facto leader of the Progressive caucus, said she passed up the council president position in order to focus on her committee work. Independent councillor Ali Dieng also expressed interest in the council president position but did not formally seek it, admitting he did not have the necessary support.

In late 2022, two Progressive councillors resigned from office: East Ward incumbent Jack Hanson resigned on September 13 to apply for a job at the Burlington Electric Department and Ward 8 incumbent Ali House resigned on October 5 for unspecified reasons. Mayor Miro Weinberger scheduled a special election for Hanson's seat on December 6, 2022, but the special election for House's seat could not be held until the regularly scheduled council elections in March 2023 because she resigned after October 1. Democrat Maea Brandt won the special election for Hanson's seat, giving Democrats the most seats on the council for the first time since 2020. This was the first election in Burlington to use ranked-choice voting after its revival, although Brandt won an outright majority of 55% in the first round and no ranked-choice tabulation was necessary.

In March 2023, Burlington residents voted to expand ranked-choice voting in city elections, to include races for mayor, city councilors, School Commissioners, Ward Clerks, and Inspectors of Election. This passed with 64% support.

== City council members ==
District	Member	Party	Elected	Term ends
Ward 1	Carter Neubieser	Progressive	2024	2028
Ward 2	Gene Bergman	Progressive	2022	2028
Ward 3	Laura Sanchez	Progressive	2026	2028
Ward 4	Sarah Carpenter	Democratic	2020	2028
Ward 5	Ben Traverse	Democratic	2022	2028
Ward 6	Becca Brown McKnight	Democratic	2024	2028
Ward 7	Evan Litwin	Democratic	2024	2028
Ward 8	Marek Broderick	Progressive	2024	2028
Central	Melo Grant	Progressive	2023	2027
East	Allie Schachter	Democratic	2025	2027
North	Mark Barlow	Independent	2021	2027
South	Ranjit "Buddy" Singh	Democratic	2025	2027

=== Composition since 2015 ===
	Wards								Districts			
Year	Ward 1	Ward 2	Ward 3	Ward 4	Ward 5	Ward 6	Ward 7	Ward 8	Central	East	North	South
2026	Carter Neubieser (Progressive)	Eugene Bergman (Progressive)	Laura Sanchez (Progressive)	Sarah E. Carpenter (Democratic)	Ben Traverse (Democratic)	Becca Brown McKnight (Democratic)	Evan Litwin (Democratic)	Marek Broderick (Progressive)	Melo Grant (Progressive)	Allie Schachter (Democratic)	Mark Barlow (Independent later Democratic)	Ranjit "Buddy" Singh (Democratic)
2025	Carter Neubieser (Progressive)	Eugene Bergman (Progressive)	Joe Kane (Progressive)	Sarah E. Carpenter (Democratic)	Ben Traverse (Democratic)	Becca Brown McKnight (Democratic)	Evan Litwin (Democratic)	Marek Broderick (Progressive)	Melo Grant (Progressive)	Allie Schachter (Democratic)	Mark Barlow (Independent later Democratic)	Ranjit "Buddy" Singh (Democratic)
2024	Carter Neubieser (Progressive)	Eugene Bergman (Progressive)	Joe Kane (Progressive)	Sarah E. Carpenter (Democratic)	Ben Traverse (Democratic)	Becca Brown McKnight (Democratic)	Evan Litwin (Democratic)	Marek Broderick (Progressive)	Melo Grant (Progressive)	Timothy C. Doherty Jr. (Democratic)	Mark Barlow (Independent later Democratic)	Joan Shannon (Democratic)
2023	Zoraya Hightower (Progressive)	Eugene Bergman (Progressive)	Joe Magee (Progressive)^{sp}	Sarah E. Carpenter (Democratic)	Ben Traverse (Democratic)	Karen Paul (Democratic)	Ali Dieng (Democratic later Independent)^{sp}	Hannah King (Democratic)^{sp}	Melo Grant (Progressive)	Timothy C. Doherty Jr. (Democratic)	Mark Barlow (Independent later Democratic)	Joan Shannon (Democratic)
2022	Zoraya Hightower (Progressive)	Eugene Bergman (Progressive)	Joe Magee (Progressive)^{sp}	Sarah E. Carpenter (Democratic)	Ben Traverse (Democratic)	Karen Paul (Democratic)	Ali Dieng (Democratic later Independent)^{sp}	Ali House (Progressive)	Perri Freeman (Progressive)	Maea Brandt (Democratic)^{sp}	Mark Barlow (Independent later Democratic)	Joan Shannon (Democratic)
2021	Zoraya Hightower (Progressive)	Max Tracy (Progressive)	Joe Magee (Progressive)^{sp}	Sarah E. Carpenter (Democratic)	William "Chip" Mason (Democratic)	Karen Paul (Democratic)	Ali Dieng (Democratic later Independent)^{sp}	Jane Stromberg (Progressive)	Perri Freeman (Progressive)	Jack Hanson (Progressive)	Mark Barlow (Independent later Democratic)	Joan Shannon (Democratic)
2020	Zoraya Hightower (Progressive)	Max Tracy (Progressive)	Brian T. Pine (Progressive)	Sarah E. Carpenter (Democratic)	William "Chip" Mason (Democratic)	Karen Paul (Democratic)	Ali Dieng (Democratic later Independent)^{sp}	Jane Stromberg (Progressive)	Perri Freeman (Progressive)	Jack Hanson (Progressive)	Franklin Paulino (Democratic)	Joan Shannon (Democratic)
2019	Sharon Foley Bushor (Independent)	Max Tracy (Progressive)	Brian T. Pine (Progressive)	Kurt Wright (Republican)	William "Chip" Mason (Democratic)	Karen Paul (Democratic)	Ali Dieng (Democratic later Independent)^{sp}	Adam Roof (Independent later Democratic)	Perri Freeman (Progressive)	Jack Hanson (Progressive)	Franklin Paulino (Democratic)	Joan Shannon (Democratic)
2018	Sharon Foley Bushor (Independent)	Max Tracy (Progressive)	Brian T. Pine (Progressive)	Kurt Wright (Republican)	William "Chip" Mason (Democratic)	Karen Paul (Democratic)	Ali Dieng (Democratic later Independent)^{sp}	Adam Roof (Independent later Democratic)	Jane Knodell (Progressive)	Richard Deane (Democratic)	Dave Hartnett (Independent)	Joan Shannon (Democratic)
2017	Sharon Foley Bushor (Independent)	Max Tracy (Progressive)	Sara Giannoni (Progressive)	Kurt Wright (Republican)	William "Chip" Mason (Democratic)	Karen Paul (Democratic)	Ali Dieng (Democratic later Independent)^{sp}	Adam Roof (Independent later Democratic)	Jane Knodell (Progressive)	Richard Deane (Democratic)	Dave Hartnett (Independent)	Joan Shannon (Democratic)
2016	Sharon Foley Bushor (Independent)	Max Tracy (Progressive)	Sara Giannoni (Progressive)	Kurt Wright (Republican)	William "Chip" Mason (Democratic)	Karen Paul (Democratic)	Tom Ayres (Democratic)	Adam Roof (Independent later Democratic)	Jane Knodell (Progressive)	Selene Colborn (Progressive)	Dave Hartnett (Independent)	Joan Shannon (Democratic)
2015	Sharon Foley Bushor (Independent)	Max Tracy (Progressive)	Sara Giannoni (Progressive)	Kurt Wright (Republican)	William "Chip" Mason (Democratic)	Karen Paul (Democratic)	Tom Ayres (Democratic)	Adam Roof (Independent later Democratic)	Jane Knodell (Progressive)	Selene Colborn (Progressive)	Dave Hartnett (Independent)	Joan Shannon (Democratic)
