= Burlington School District =

School district in Vermont, US

Coordinates: 44.4776°N 73.2224°W

Burlington School District is a school district in Vermont, United States. It has its headquarters in Burlington.

The budget for 2009-10 was $49.9 million. The increase in fiscal year 2009 was a voter approved 9.9% above the prior year. The percentage increase was above the state average. This amount was exceeded by $750,000.

In 2008, about 26% of the city's 3,600 students were minorities. This contrasts with the state where 96% of the population was white.

The Burlington School District is a partner in the Burlington School Food Project, a food program that aims to bring fresh produce to students and their families.

== Schools ==
- Burlington High School
- Edmunds Elementary School, named for George F. Edmunds, a U.S. Senator for 25 years, from 1866 to 1891.
- Edmunds Middle School
- Hunt Middle School
- Flynn Elementary
- Champlain Elementary School
- C. P. Smith Elementary
- Integrated Arts Academy/Wheeler
- Sustainability Academy At Lawrence Barnes
