= 2009 Burlington, Vermont mayoral election =

American municipal election in Vermont

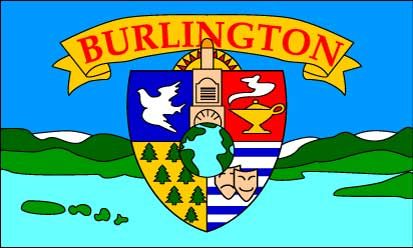
- March 3, 2009
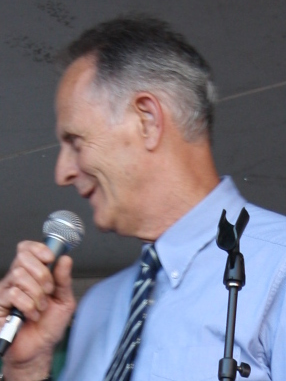

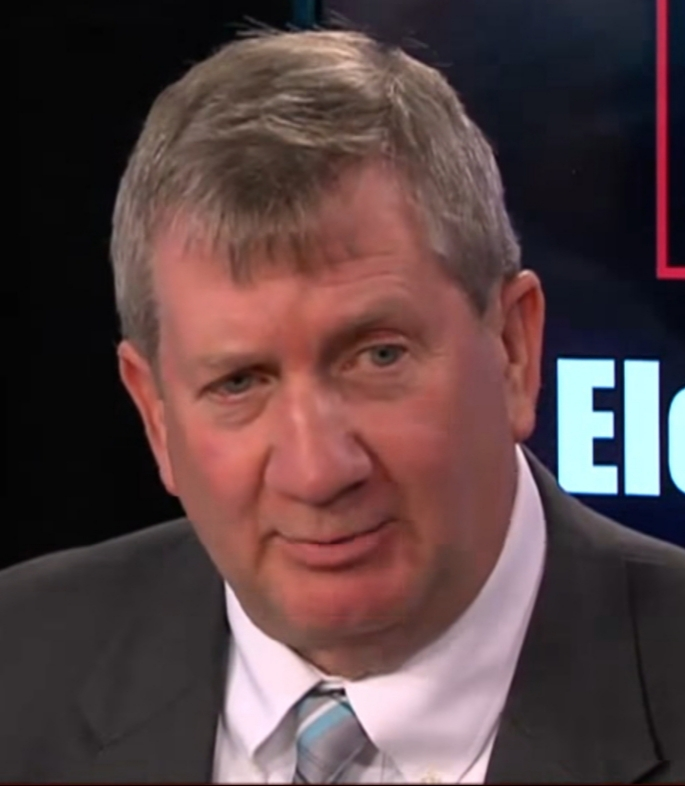
Nominee	Bob Kiss	Kurt Wright
Party	Progressive	Republican
First round	2,585 (28.8%)	2,951 (32.9%)
Best round	4,313 (48.0%)	4,061 (45.2%)
Nominee	Andy Montroll	Dan Smith
Party	Democratic	Independent
First round	2,063 (23.0%)	1,306 (14.6%)
Best round	2,554 (28.4%)	1,306 (14.6%)
- Kiss: 30–40% 40–50% 50–60% 60–70% 70–80% Wright: 50–60% 60–70% Montroll: 30–40% 40–50%
Mayor before election
Bob Kiss
Progressive
Elected mayor
Bob Kiss
Progressive

The 2009 Burlington mayoral election was the second mayoral election since the city's 2005 change to instant-runoff voting (IRV), also known as ranked-choice voting (RCV), after the 2006 mayoral election. In the 2009 election, incumbent Burlington mayor (Bob Kiss) won reelection as a member of the Vermont Progressive Party, defeating Kurt Wright in the final round with 48% of the vote (51.5% excluding exhausted ballots).

The election created controversy as a result of several election pathologies. Unlike the city's first IRV election three years prior, Kiss was neither the plurality winner nor the majority-preferred candidate (Democrat Andy Montroll), and Kiss was declared winner as a result of 750 votes cast against his candidacy (ranking him last). The election is a well-known example of a center squeeze, a kind of spoiler effect in IRV that favors more-extreme candidates over more-moderate ones.

The controversy surrounding the election ended in a successful 2010 citizen's initiative which repealed IRV by a vote of 52% to 48%.

== Background ==
Since Bernie Sanders' election as mayor in 1981, his allies and the Vermont Progressive Party had continuously held the mayoralty except for two years. The number of registered voters in Burlington rose from 24,991 in 2006, to 33,200 in 2009.

The city of Burlington, Vermont, approved IRV for use in mayoral elections with a 64% vote in 2005, at a time when IRV was used only in a few local elections in the United States. The 2006 Burlington, Vermont mayoral election was decided by two rounds of IRV tallying, selecting candidate Bob Kiss of the Vermont Progressive Party (VPP). In the election, Kiss prevailed over Democrat Hinda Miller and Republican Kevin Curley. With his election Kiss became the second member of the VPP to be elected to the office after Peter Clavelle.

== Nominations ==
=== Progressive ===
Kiss officially launched his campaign on January 7, 2009.

=== Democratic ===
On December 3, 2008, the Democrats unanimously selected to give their nomination to Montroll, who was nominated by Representative Johannah Leddy Donovan. Montroll's website was hacked two times during the campaign to feature materials about Turkey and the statements "Oooo Yeah" and "DumansaL Was Here" before being signed by "White Devil".

=== Republican ===
Kurt Wright, president of the city council, announced his campaign on December 11, 2008.

=== Other ===
Dan Smith, the son of Peter Plympton Smith, announced that he would run as an independent on December 2, 2008. His cousin Emily served as his campaign manager.

== Campaign ==
During the campaign raised $50,986 and spent $51,193, Wright raised $39,365 and spent $34,585, Montroll raised $24,202 and spent $23,021, and Kiss raised $20,265 and spent $19,946. In the last ten days of the campaign Wright raised and spent more than his opponents. Kiss received $5,000 from family members, Montroll received $4,875, Smith received $3,800, and Wright received nothing.

5 of the 7 city councilors up for reelection declined to run, including Montroll and Wright who ran for mayor instead. The Republicans lost a seat while the Democrats gained one resulting in a composition of 7 Democrats, 3 Progressives, 2 Republicans, and 2 independents.

2009 Burlington, Vermont mayoral election debates
No.	Date & Time	Host	Moderator	Link	Participants			
Key: P Participant A Absent N Non-invitee I Invitee					Progressive	Republican	Democratic	Independent
Key: P Participant A Absent N Non-invitee I Invitee					Bob Kiss	Kurt Wright	Andy Montroll	Dan Smith
1	January 8, 2009; 8:00 a.m. EDT	Burlington Business Association	Brad Robertson; Mike Townsend		P	P	P	P
2	February 5, 2009	Seven Days	Ken Picard; Shay Totten		P	P	P	P
3	February 10, 2009; 5:00 p.m. EDT	Town Meeting Television			P	P	P	P
4	February 15, 2009	Vermont Interfaith Action			P	A	P	P
5	February 22, 2009				P	P	P	P

== Results ==
A recount was requested by Wright, but he withdrew his demand on March 10, after 43% of the votes were recounted.

Burlington, Vermont mayoral election, 2009 (Summary analysis)
Party	Candidate	Maximum round	Maximum votes	Share in maximum round	Maximum votes First round votes Transfer votes
Progressive	Bob Kiss	3	4,313	48.0%	
Republican	Kurt Wright	3	4,061	45.2%	
Democratic	Andy Montroll	2	2,554	28.4%	
Independent	Dan Smith	1	1,306	14.5%	
Green	James Simpson	1	35	0.4%	
Write-in		1	36	0.4%	
Exhausted votes			606	6.7%	

The elimination rounds were as follows:

Candidates		1st round			2nd round				3rd round			
Candidate	Party	Votes	%	% Active	±	Votes	%	% Active	±	Votes	%	% Active
Kurt Wright	Republican	2,951	32.9%	32.9%	+343	3,294	36.7%	37.3%	+767	4,061	45.2%	48.5%
Bob Kiss	Progressive	2,585	28.8%	28.8%	+396	2,981	33.2%	33.8%	+1332	4,313	48.0%	51.5%
Andy Montroll	Democrat	2,063	23.0%	23.0%	+491	2,554	28.4%	28.9%	X mark	Eliminated		
Dan Smith	Independent	1,306	14.5%	14.5%	X mark	Eliminated						
James Simpson	Green	35	0.4%	0.4%	X mark	Eliminated						
Write-in		40	0.4%	0.4%	X mark	Eliminated						
Exhausted		0	0.0%	0.0%	+147	151	1.7%		+455	606	6.7%	
Total		8980	100.0%		8980		100.0%		8980		100.0%	

== Analysis ==
FairVote touted the 2009 election as one of its major success stories, with IRV helping the city avoid the cost of a traditional runoff election (which likely would not have changed who won). They also argued IRV prevented a spoiler effect that would have occurred under plurality.

Later analyses stated the race was spoiled, however, with Wright acting as a spoiler pulling moderate votes from Montroll, who would have defeated Kiss in a one-on-one race. (However, when Montroll's votes were transferred, they went largely to Kiss, not to Wright.)

FairVote also claimed the election as a success story because 99.9% of voters filled out at least one preference on their ranked-choice ballot. 16.5% of voters only selected one candidate, with 28.5% of Wright's and 29% of Kiss' voters doing so. 37.8% of the voters did not select a third candidate. 7% of ballots did not rank either of the candidates in the last round, leaving them unrepresented.

Some mathematicians and voting theorists criticized the election results as revealing several pathologies associated with instant-runoff voting, noting that Kiss was elected as a result of 750 votes cast against him (ranking Kiss in last place).

Several electoral reform advocates branded the election a failure after Kiss was elected despite 54% of voters voting for Montroll over Kiss, violating the principle of majority rule.

=== Tournament matrix ===
The results of every possible one-on-one election can be completed as follows:

Andy Montroll (D)	6262 (Montroll) – 591 (Simpson)	4570 (Montroll) – 2997 (Smith)	4597 (Montroll) – 3664 (Wright)	4064 (Montroll) – 3476 (Kiss)	4/4 Wins
Bob Kiss (P)	5514 (Kiss) – 844 (Simpson)	3944 (Kiss) – 3576 (Smith)	4313 (Kiss) – 4061 (Wright)	3/4 Wins	
Kurt Wright (R)	5270 (Wright) – 1310 (Simpson)	3971 (Wright) – 3793 (Smith)	2/4 Wins		
Dan Smith (I)	5570 (Smith) – 721 (Simpson)	1/4 Wins			
James Simpson (G)	0/4 Wins				

This leads to an overall preference ranking of:

1. Montroll – defeats all candidates below, including Kiss (4,064 to 3,476)
2. Kiss – defeats all candidates below, including Wright (4,313 to 4,061)
3. Wright – defeats all candidates below, including Smith (3,971 to 3,793)
4. Smith – defeats Simpson (5,570 to 721) and the write-in candidates

Montroll was therefore preferred over Kiss by 54% of voters, preferred over Wright by 56% of voters, over Smith by 60%, and over Simpson by 91% of voters.

=== Hypothetical results under various voting systems ===
Because all ballots were fully released, it is possible to reconstruct the winners under other voting methods. While Wright would have won under plurality, Kiss won under IRV, and if they voted again the same way that they marked their preferential ballot, he would have won under a two-round vote or a traditional nonpartisan blanket primary.

Montroll, being the Condorcet winner, would have won if the ballots were counted using ranked pairs (or any other Condorcet method). Analyses suggested Montroll also would have won under most rated voting methods, including score voting, approval voting, majority judgment, or STAR voting.

== Effect on IRV in Burlington ==
Repeal of RCV
- 2 March 2010

Results
Choice	Votes	%
Yes	3,972	51.98%
No	3,669	48.02%
Valid votes	7,641	100.00%
Invalid or blank votes	0	0.00%
Total votes	7,641	100.00%

There was post-election controversy regarding the IRV method, and in March 2010 a citizen's initiative resulted in the repeal of IRV in Burlington. The initially "stagnant" repeal campaign drew renewed interest as Kiss became embroiled in a series of controversies. In December 2009, a group called "One Person, One Vote", made up of Republicans and Democrats unhappy with the election outcome, held a press conference to announce that they had collected enough signatures for an initiative to repeal IRV. According to a local columnist, the vote was a referendum on Kiss's mayoralty; Kiss had allegedly become a "lame duck" because of a scandal relating to Burlington Telecom and other local issues. However, in an interview with Vermont Public Radio, Kiss disputed that claim, and those gathering signatures for the repeal stated that it was specifically a rejection of IRV itself.

Locals argued the system was convoluted, turned the 2009 election into a "gambling game" by disqualifying Montroll for having won too many votes, and "eliminated the most popular moderate candidate and elected an extremist".

David Zuckerman stated that the success of the repeal was due to Kiss' unpopularity and scandals in his administration. Rob Richie, the executive director of FairVote, said that ranked choice would have been more popular had it been used for the city council as well.

The IRV repeal initiative in March 2010 won 52% to 48%. It earned a majority of the vote in only two of the city's seven wards, but the vote in those 2009 strongholds for Kurt Wright was lopsided against IRV. Republican Governor Jim Douglas signed the repeal into law in April 2010, saying "Voting ought to be transparent and easy to understand, and affects the will of the voters in a direct way. I'm glad the city has agreed to a more traditional process."

The repeal reverted the system back to a 40% rule that requires a top-two runoff if no candidate exceeds 40% of the vote. Had the 2009 election occurred under these rules, Kiss and Wright would have advanced to the runoff. If the same voters had participated in the runoff as in the first election and not changed their preferences, Kiss would have won the runoff.

The following decade saw continuing controversy about voting methods in Burlington. In 2011, for example, an initiative effort to increase the winning threshold from the 40% plurality to a 50% majority failed by 58.5% to 41.5%, while in 2019, instant-runoff voting was once again proposed for Burlington by Councilor Jack Hanson but went unapproved by the Charter Change Committee for the March 2020 ballot.

One year later, in July 2020, the city council voted 6–5 in support of a measure to reinstate IRV, but it was vetoed by Mayor Miro Weinberger the following month. The council then amended the measure to apply only to the council itself, which the Mayor accepted, and on March 2, 2021, Burlington voters voted in favor of IRV for its city council by 64% to 36% (8,914 to 4,918). The charter change required approval by the Vermont legislature, which enacted it in May of 2022, and which the governor allowed to become law without his signature. The council in September 2022, the voters in March 2023, and the legislature in May 2023 approved the expansion of use of IRV for mayor, school commissioners, and ward election officers, with first use in March 2024.

== Endorsements ==
List of Bob Kiss endorsements

Federal officials

- Bernie Sanders, member of the United States Senate (2007–present) and mayor of Burlington, Vermont (1981–1989)

Local officials

- Tim Ashe, member of the Vermont Senate (2009–2021) and Burlington city council from the 3rd ward (2004–2008)
List of Dan Smith endorsements

State officials

- Hinda Miller, member of the Vermont Senate (2002–2013) and candidate for mayor in 2006 election
List of Kurt Wright endorsements

Local officials

- Paul Decelles, member of the Burlington city council
- Craig Gutchell, member of the Burlington city council
- Dave Hartnett, Burlington Parks Commissioner
- John Ewing, Burlington Parks Commissioner (Democratic)

Organizations

- Burlington Firefighters Association

== See also ==
- Center squeeze

== Works cited ==
- "IRV By The Numbers". The Burlington Free Press. March 8, 2009. p. 4A – via Newspapers.com.
- "Mayoral debate: The first take". The Burlington Free Press. January 9, 2009. p. 5A – via Newspapers.com.
- "Sanders endorse Kiss for mayor". The Burlington Free Press. February 18, 2009. p. 3B – via Newspapers.com.
- Baird, Joel (March 7, 2009). "Wright wants recount". The Burlington Free Press. p. 1A – via Newspapers.com.
- Barlow, Daniel (April 27, 2010). "IRV". Rutland Herald. p. B4 – via Newspapers.com.
- Briggs, John (January 21, 2009). "5 council incumbents bow out". The Burlington Free Press. p. 1B – via Newspapers.com.
- Briggs, John (January 8, 2009). "Candidates for mayor debate today". The Burlington Free Press. p. 1B – via Newspapers.com.
- Briggs, John (December 24, 2008). "Challengers target Kiss leadership". The Burlington Free Press. p. 1B – via Newspapers.com.
- Briggs, John (March 3, 2009). "City: Early results promised". The Burlington Free Press. p. 3B – via Newspapers.com.
- Briggs, John (March 4, 2009). "Democrats gain strength on council". The Burlington Free Press. p. 2B – via Newspapers.com.
- Briggs, John (December 4, 2008). "Democrats nominate Montroll for mayor's race". The Burlington Free Press. p. 1B – via Newspapers.com.
- Briggs, John (January 27, 2009). "Firefighters endorse Wright for mayor". The Burlington Free Press. p. 2B – via Newspapers.com.
- Briggs, John (February 11, 2009). "Four mayoral rivals clash". The Burlington Free Press. p. 1B – via Newspapers.com.
- Briggs, John (January 23, 2009). "Hackers hit Montroll site". The Burlington Free Press. p. 1B – via Newspapers.com.
- Briggs, John (December 3, 2008). "Independent Smith announces run for mayor". The Burlington Free Press. p. 1B – via Newspapers.com.
- Briggs, John (January 9, 2009). "Mayor candidates seek edge". The Burlington Free Press. p. 1B – via Newspapers.com.
- Briggs, John (February 5, 2009). "Mayoral candidates debate". The Burlington Free Press. p. 1B – via Newspapers.com.
- Briggs, John (December 12, 2008). "Republican Wright announces candidacy for mayor". The Burlington Free Press. p. 1B – via Newspapers.com.
- Briggs, John (March 11, 2009). "Wright calls off recount". The Burlington Free Press. p. 1A – via Newspapers.com.
- Hallenbeck, Terri (March 4, 2009). "Independent status held Smith back". The Burlington Free Press. p. 3B – via Newspapers.com.
- Hemingway, Sam (March 25, 2009). "Winner Kiss spends the least in race for mayor". The Burlington Free Press. p. 3B – via Newspapers.com.
- Ryan, Matt (February 16, 2009). "Candidates questioned". The Burlington Free Press. p. 6A – via Newspapers.com.
- Ryan, Matt (February 23, 2009). "Candidates seek edge". The Burlington Free Press. p. 6A – via Newspapers.com.
- Silverman, Adam (March 4, 2009). "Dober wins Ward 7 council runoff". The Burlington Free Press. p. 1B – via Newspapers.com.
