= 2012 Burlington, Vermont mayoral election =

Burlington mayoral election, 2012
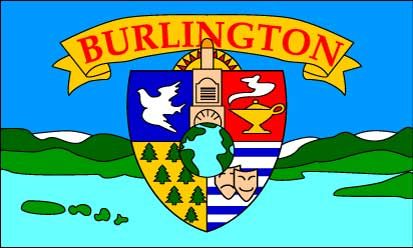
- March 6, 2012
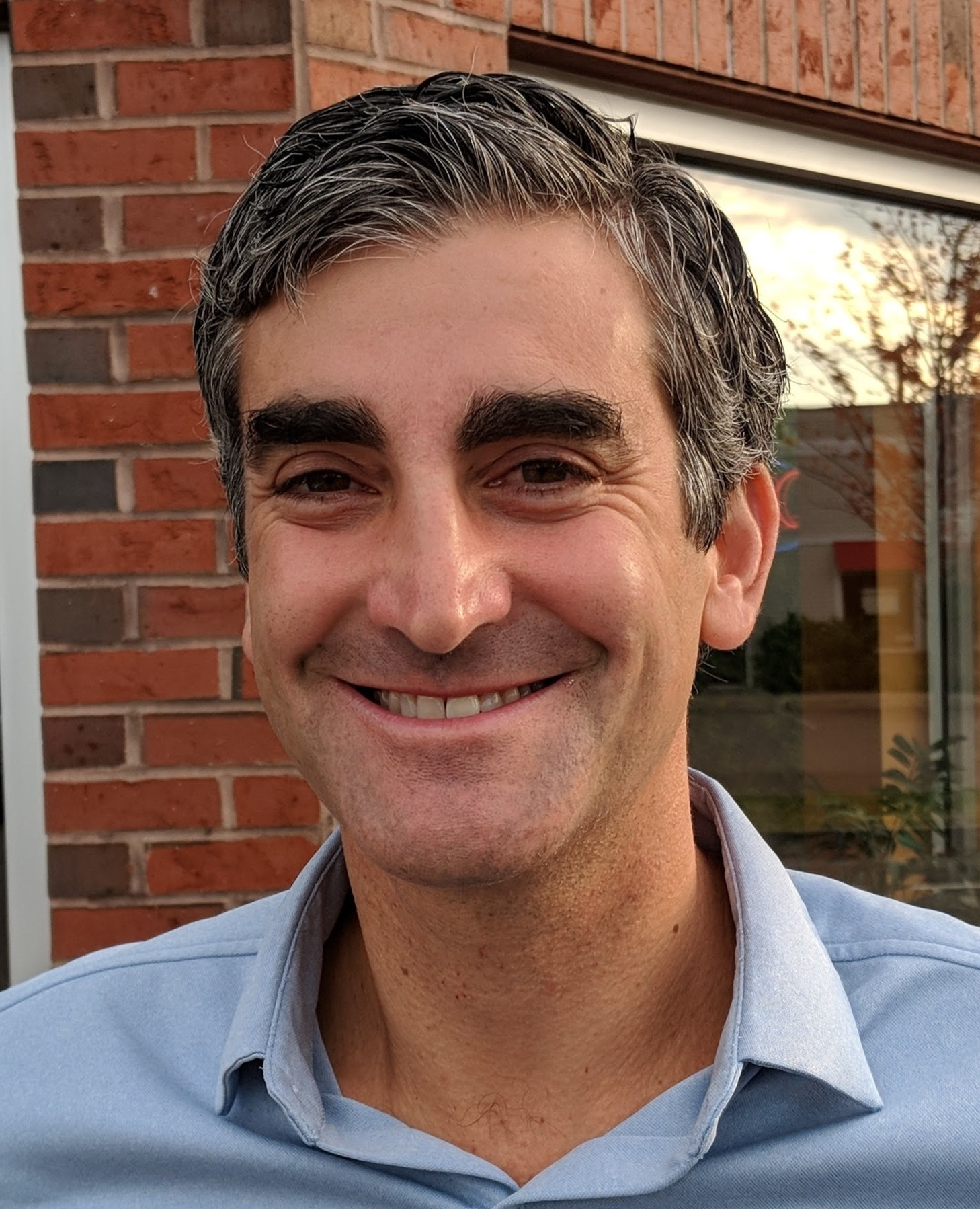

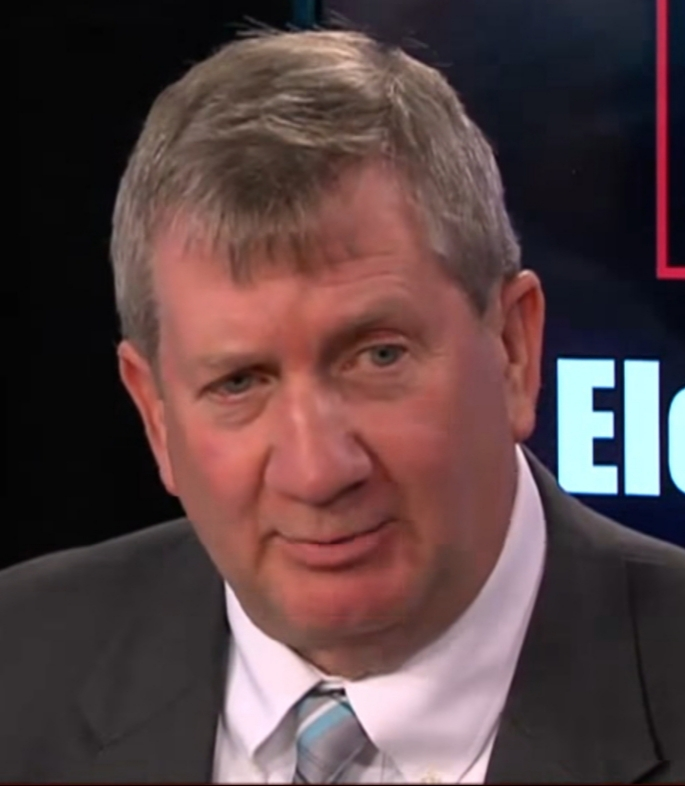

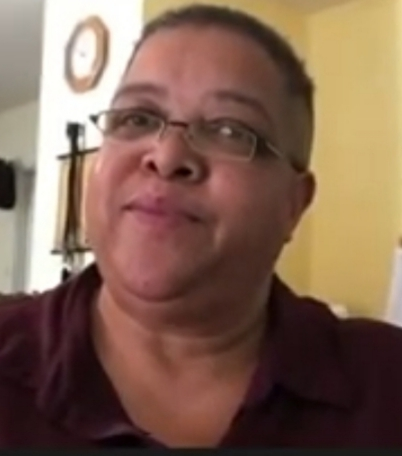
Nominee	Miro Weinberger	Kurt Wright	Wanda Hines
Party	Democratic	Republican	Independent
Popular vote	5,801	3,746	506
Percentage	57.27%	36.98%	5.00%
- Results by ward Weinberger: 60–70% Wright: 50–60%
Mayor before election
Bob Kiss
Progressive
Elected mayor
Miro Weinberger
Democratic

On March 6, 2012, a mayoral election was held in Burlington, Vermont. Incumbent Progressive Mayor Bob Kiss declined to seek reelection. Democratic nominee Miro Weinberger defeated Republican nominee Kurt Wright and independent candidate Wanda Hines.

Ranked choice voting, which was used in the two prior elections, was repealed in 2010, amid scandals and declining popularity for Kiss' administration. Kiss declined to seek reelection and the Progressives declined to run a candidate for the first time in their history.

Weinberger defeated Tim Ashe, a Progressive, for the Democratic nomination and was later endorsed by former Progressive mayors Bernie Sanders and Peter Clavelle. This was the most expensive mayoral election in Burlington's history and Weinberger had the record for most expensive campaign, besting the record set in 2006.

== Background ==
Since Bernie Sanders' election as mayor in 1981, his allies and the Vermont Progressive Party had continuously held the mayoralty except for two years.

Ranked choice voting was used in the 2006 and 2009 mayoral elections, but was repealed by a referendum in 2010. David Zuckerman stated that the success of the repeal was due to Kiss' unpopularity and scandals in his administration.

== Nominations ==
=== Democratic ===
Nominated

- Miro Weinberger, developer and member of the Burlington Airport Commission

Eliminated

- Tim Ashe, member of the Vermont Senate (2009–2021) and Burlington City Council from the 3rd ward (2004–2008)
- Bram Kranichfeld, member of the Burlington City Council from the 2nd ward
- Jason Lorber, member of the Vermont House of Representatives (2005–2013)

Jason Lorber announced his campaign in August 2011, Miro Weinberger on September 13, and Bram Kranichfeld on September 14, 2011. Ashe, a Progressive, was allowed by his party's by-laws to run for the Democratic nomination, but a Democrat could not run for the Progressive nomination.

Three candidate forums were held. The caucus on November 13 failed to select a winner after three rounds of balloting and a recount produced a tie between Ashe and Weinberger. Another forum was held on December 8, before Weinberger won the nomination on December 11.

By October 14, Lorber raised $19,305. Weinberg raised $42,320 and spent $49,961 while seeking the Democratic nomination.

2012 Burlington, Vermont mayoral Democratic primary election
Candidate	Round 1		Round 2		Round 3		Round 4	
Candidate	Votes	%	Votes	%	Votes	%	Votes	%
Miro Weinberger	391	29.87%	390	32.05%	540	50.00%	655	55.13%
Tim Ashe	458	34.99%	471	38.70%	540	50.00%	533	44.87%
Bram Kranichfeld	354	27.04%	356	29.25%	Eliminated			
Jason Lorber	106	8.10%	Eliminated					

=== Progressive ===
Declined

- T. J. Donovan, State's Attorney of Chittenden County, Vermont (2007–2017) (Declined August 15, 2011)
- Bob Kiss, 41st Mayor of Burlington, Vermont (2006–2012) (Declined November 30, 2011)

Incumbent Mayor Bob Kiss declined to seek reelection on November 30, 2011. The Progressives held their caucus on December 11, but postponed a decision on their mayoral nomination until January. Ashe said that he would not accept the Progressive nomination if he lost the Democratic nomination. On January 22, the caucus, which Kiss did not attend, unanimously voted to not run a mayoral candidate. This was the first time the party did not run a mayoral candidate.

=== Republican ===
Kurt Wright announced his campaign on September 20, 2011, rather than seek reelection to the city council. Tayt Brooks stepped down as chair of the Vermont Republican Party so that he could help Wright's campaign. Democratic city councilor Dave Hartnett co-chaired Wright's campaign with Republican Charlie Smith and Democratic Planning Commissioner John Ewing managed it. He received the nomination on December 11, at a caucus attended by 12 people.

== Campaign ==
Wanda Hines launched an independent campaign on January 6, 2012. Wright was the first Republican to receive the endorsement of the Burlington Police Officers Association since Peter Brownell in 1993. All three candidates participated in a debate on February 22, that had questions asked from Twitter users.

Wright called for Weinberger to join him in releasing weekly campaign finance reports and limited themselves to $40,000 in spending, but Weinberger declined. By February, Wright had raised $32,611 and spent $15,143 to be left with $16,478 on hand while Weinberger raised $67,389 and spent $63,759 to be left with $3,630 on hand. Wright criticized Weinberger for an event in Washington D.C. that raised $8,000 for his campaign. In total, Weinberger raised $126,343 and spent $125,015, Wright raised $60,358 and spent $58,261, and Hines raised $2,930. It was the most expensive mayoral election in the city's history and Weinberger broke the record for most expensive campaign, which was held by Hinda Miller's $66,758 in 2006.

In the concurrent city council elections the Progressives gained one seat while the Republicans lost one. This produced a composition of 7 Democrats, 3 Progressives, 2 Republicans, and 2 independents.

2012 Burlington, Vermont mayoral election debates and forums
No.	Date & Time	Host	Moderator	Link	Participants		
Key: P Participant A Absent N Non-invitee I Invitee					Democratic	Republican	Independent
Key: P Participant A Absent N Non-invitee I Invitee					Miro Weinberger	Kurt Wright	Wanda Hines
1	January 5, 2012	Burlington Business Association; Burlington Social Media Breakfast Club			P	P	
2	January 12, 2012; 6:30 p.m. EDT	AARP	Jennifer Wallace-Brodeur; Chapin Spencer; Michael Townsend		P	P	P
3	January 23, 2012	Sustainability Academy			P	P	P
4	February 1, 2012	Burlington College's Institute for Civic Engagement			P	P	P
5	February 2, 2012	Ward 6 Neighborhood Planning Assembly	Jennifer Wallace-Brodeur; Chapin Spencer; Michael Townsend		P	P	P
6	February 8, 2012	The Burlington Free Press			P	P	P

== Election results ==
Burlington mayoral election, 2012
Party	Candidate	Votes	%
Democratic	Miro Weinberger	5,801	57.27%
Republican	Kurt Wright	3,746	36.98%
Independent	Wanda Hines	506	5.00%
Write-in		76	0.75%
Total votes		10,129	100.00%
Democratic gain from Progressive			

== Endorsements ==
List of Wanda Hines endorsements

Local officials

- Ron Ruloff, candidate for Burlington City Council from the 3rd ward (independent)
List of Bram Kranichfeld endorsements

State officials

- Bill Aswad, member of the Vermont House of Representatives (1995–2012)
- Sandy Baird, member of the Vermont House of Representatives
- Johannah Leddy Donovan, member of the Vermont House of Representatives
- Mary Sullivan, member of the Vermont House of Representatives
- Suzi Wizowati, member of the Vermont House of Representatives
List of Miro Weinberger endorsements

Federal officials

- Bernie Sanders, member of the United States Senate (2007–present)
- Peter Welch, member of the United States House of Representatives from Vermont's at-large congressional district (2007–2023)

State officials

- Philip Baruth, member of the Vermont Senate (2011–present)
- Howard Dean, 79th Governor of Vermont (1991–2003)
- Madeleine Kunin, 77th Governor of Vermont (1985–1991)
- Hinda Miller, member of the Vermont Senate (2002–2013)
- Peter Shumlin, 81st Governor of Vermont (2011–2017)
- Rachel Weston, member of the Vermont House of Representatives (2007–2012)

Local officials

- David Berezniak, member of the Burlington City Council from the 2nd ward
- Norm Blais, member of the Burlington City Council from the 6th ward
- Peter Clavelle, 38th and 40th Mayor of Burlington, Vermont (1989–1993; 1995–2006)
- Bill Keogh, member of the Burlington City Council from the 5th ward and president of the Burlington City Council
- Joan Shannon, member of the Burlington City Council from the 5th ward
- George Thabault, member of the Burlington City Council from the 5th ward (Progressive)
List of Kurt Wright endorsements

State officials

- Sandy Baird, member of the Vermont House of Representatives (Democratic)

Local officials

- Vince Brennan, member of the Burlington City Council from the 3rd ward (Progressive)
- Sharon Bushor, member of the Burlington City Council from the 1st ward (independent)

Organizations

- Burlington Police Officers Association
No endorsement

Organizations

- Burlington Firefighters Union

== Works cited ==
- "Burlington mayoral candidates' strengths, weaknesses emerge". The Burlington Free Press. February 12, 2012. p. 6C – via Newspapers.com.
- "Caucus: Two are left after 3 rounds". The Burlington Free Press. November 14, 2011. p. 3A – via Newspapers.com.
- "Free Press, #BTVSMB hosts Twitter debate". The Burlington Free Press. February 25, 2012. p. 2B – via Newspapers.com.
- "Mayoral debate Thursday". The Burlington Free Press. January 11, 2012. p. 1B – via Newspapers.com.
- "Progressives gain one council seat; GOP loses one". The Burlington Free Press. March 7, 2012. p. 4B – via Newspapers.com.
- "Student host Burlington mayoral debate". The Burlington Free Press. January 24, 2012. p. 3B – via Newspapers.com.
- "Republicans: Wright is the one". The Burlington Free Press. December 12, 2011. p. 1A – via Newspapers.com.
- "Vt. GOP gets new executive director". Barre Montpelier Times Argus. October 25, 2011. p. A6 – via Newspapers.com.
- "Welch to endorse Weinberger for mayor". The Burlington Free Press. February 21, 2012. p. 7A – via Newspapers.com.
- Baird, Joel (February 2, 2012). "3 candidates address topics at city forum". The Burlington Free Press. p. 1B – via Newspapers.com.
- Baird, Joel (January 13, 2012). "Candidates debate transportation". The Burlington Free Press. p. 1B – via Newspapers.com.
- Baird, Joel (January 25, 2012). "City police union endorses Wright". The Burlington Free Press. p. 1B – via Newspapers.com.
- Baird, Joel (December 9, 2011). "Dean picks but, oddly, can't vote". The Burlington Free Press. p. 1A – via Newspapers.com.
- Baird, Joel (January 13, 2012). "Debate: Transportation issues discussed". The Burlington Free Press. p. 4B – via Newspapers.com.
- Baird, Joel (October 7, 2011). "Democrats expand campaign for Burlington mayor". The Burlington Free Press. p. 1B – via Newspapers.com.
- Baird, Joel (December 12, 2011). "Democrats: No longer tied with Ashe, nominee sees 'new chapter' for Burlington". The Burlington Free Press. p. 1A – via Newspapers.com.
- Baird, Joel (August 16, 2011). "Donovan won't run for mayor". The Burlington Free Press. p. 1B – via Newspapers.com.
- Baird, Joel (January 7, 2012). "Former mayor Clavelle endorses Weinberger". The Burlington Free Press. p. 3A – via Newspapers.com.
- Baird, Joel (December 9, 2011). "Forum sets stage for caucus". The Burlington Free Press. p. 1B – via Newspapers.com.
- Baird, Joel (January 7, 2012). "Hines: Candidate offers another voice". The Burlington Free Press. p. 3A – via Newspapers.com.
- Baird, Joel (February 17, 2012). "Independent councilor Bushor endorses Wright". The Burlington Free Press. p. 4A – via Newspapers.com.
- Baird, Joel (November 14, 2011). "It's now a real race". The Burlington Free Press. p. 1A – via Newspapers.com.
- Baird, Joel (February 3, 2012). "Jabs exchanged at mayoral debate". The Burlington Free Press. p. 1B – via Newspapers.com.
- Baird, Joel (September 15, 2011). "Kranichfeld is third Democrat to seek Burlington mayor's post". The Burlington Free Press. p. 1A – via Newspapers.com.
- Baird, Joel (February 1, 2012). "Mayor: Republican Wright has more money on hand". The Burlington Free Press. p. 4A – via Newspapers.com.
- Baird, Joel (September 14, 2011). "Mayor: Weinberger joins Burlington race". The Burlington Free Press. p. 8A – via Newspapers.com.
- Baird, Joel (November 9, 2011). "Mayoral hopefuls make final pitch". The Burlington Free Press. p. 1B – via Newspapers.com.
- Baird, Joel (January 7, 2012). "'Pathways of opportunity'". The Burlington Free Press. p. 1A – via Newspapers.com.
- Baird, Joel (January 23, 2012). "Progressives skip mayoral race". The Burlington Free Press. p. 1B – via Newspapers.com.
- Baird, Joel (February 7, 2012). "Shumlin endorses Weinberger for mayor". The Burlington Free Press. p. 1B – via Newspapers.com.
- Baird, Joel (January 6, 2012). "Similar Stances". The Burlington Free Press. p. 1B – via Newspapers.com.
- Baird, Joel (December 14, 2011). "The Challenge". The Burlington Free Press. p. 1A – via Newspapers.com.
- Baird, Joel (November 17, 2011). "Weinberger gains endorsements for Burlington mayor". The Burlington Free Press. p. 7C – via Newspapers.com.
- Baird, Joel (September 14, 2011). "Weinberger joins race for mayor". The Burlington Free Press. p. 1A – via Newspapers.com.
- Baird, Joel (February 1, 2012). "With 5 weeks to go, Wright has more money than Weinberger". The Burlington Free Press. p. 1A – via Newspapers.com.
- Baird, Joel (November 7, 2011). "Wright reaches outside the GOP". The Burlington Free Press. p. 1B – via Newspapers.com.
- Baird, Joel (September 21, 2011). "Wright to run on 'credibility'". The Burlington Free Press. p. 1A – via Newspapers.com.
- Banner, Joel (February 10, 2012). "'Genetic' Democrat backs Wright". The Burlington Free Press. p. 5A – via Newspapers.com.
- Barlow, Daniel (April 27, 2010). "Instant run-off voting experiment ends in Burlington". Rutland Herald. p. B3 – via Newspapers.com.
- Barlow, Daniel (April 27, 2010). "IRV". Rutland Herald. p. B4 – via Newspapers.com.
- Briggs, John (November 20, 2011). "Caucus: Ashe candidacy perceived as threat to party by some key Democrats". The Burlington Free Press. p. 2B – via Newspapers.com.
- Briggs, John (December 3, 2008). "Independent Smith announces run for mayor". The Burlington Free Press. p. 1B – via Newspapers.com.
- Briggs, John (December 1, 2011). "Kiss administration experienced ups, downs". The Burlington Free Press. p. 2C – via Newspapers.com.
- Briggs, John (October 21, 2011). "Lorber discloses mayoral campaign contributions". The Burlington Free Press. p. 1B – via Newspapers.com.
- Donoghue, Mike (December 12, 2011). "Progressives: Left at the altar without Ashe". The Burlington Free Press. p. 1A – via Newspapers.com.
- Donoghue, Mike (December 12, 2011). "Progressives: Party postpones choice". The Burlington Free Press. p. 1A – via Newspapers.com.
- Hemingway, Sam (March 17, 2012). "Mayoral Race: Six-year record for funding was broken". The Burlington Free Press. p. 3B – via Newspapers.com.
- Hemingway, Sam (February 22, 2012). "Progressive Brennan backs Wright campaign". The Burlington Free Press. p. 1B – via Newspapers.com.
- Hemingway, Sam (January 31, 2012). "Progressives hope to meet with mayoral candidates". The Burlington Free Press. p. 2B – via Newspapers.com.
- Hemingway, Sam (February 24, 2012). "Progressives: Torn by choices campaign". The Burlington Free Press. p. 4A – via Newspapers.com.
- Hemingway, Sam (March 1, 2012). "Sanders endorse Weinberger in race". The Burlington Free Press. p. 1B – via Newspapers.com.
- Hemingway, Sam (February 28, 2012). "The most expensive mayoral race in city history". The Burlington Free Press. p. 1A – via Newspapers.com.
- Hemingway, Sam (March 17, 2012). "Weinberger sprinted through the wire". The Burlington Free Press. p. 1B – via Newspapers.com.
- Hemingway, Sam (February 2, 2012). "Weinberger taps D.C. contributors". The Burlington Free Press. p. 1C – via Newspapers.com.
- Walsh, Molly (February 11, 2012). "Firefighters won't endorse a candidate". The Burlington Free Press. p. 1A – via Newspapers.com.
