= 2021 Burlington, Vermont mayoral election =

2021 Burlington mayoral election
- March 2, 2021
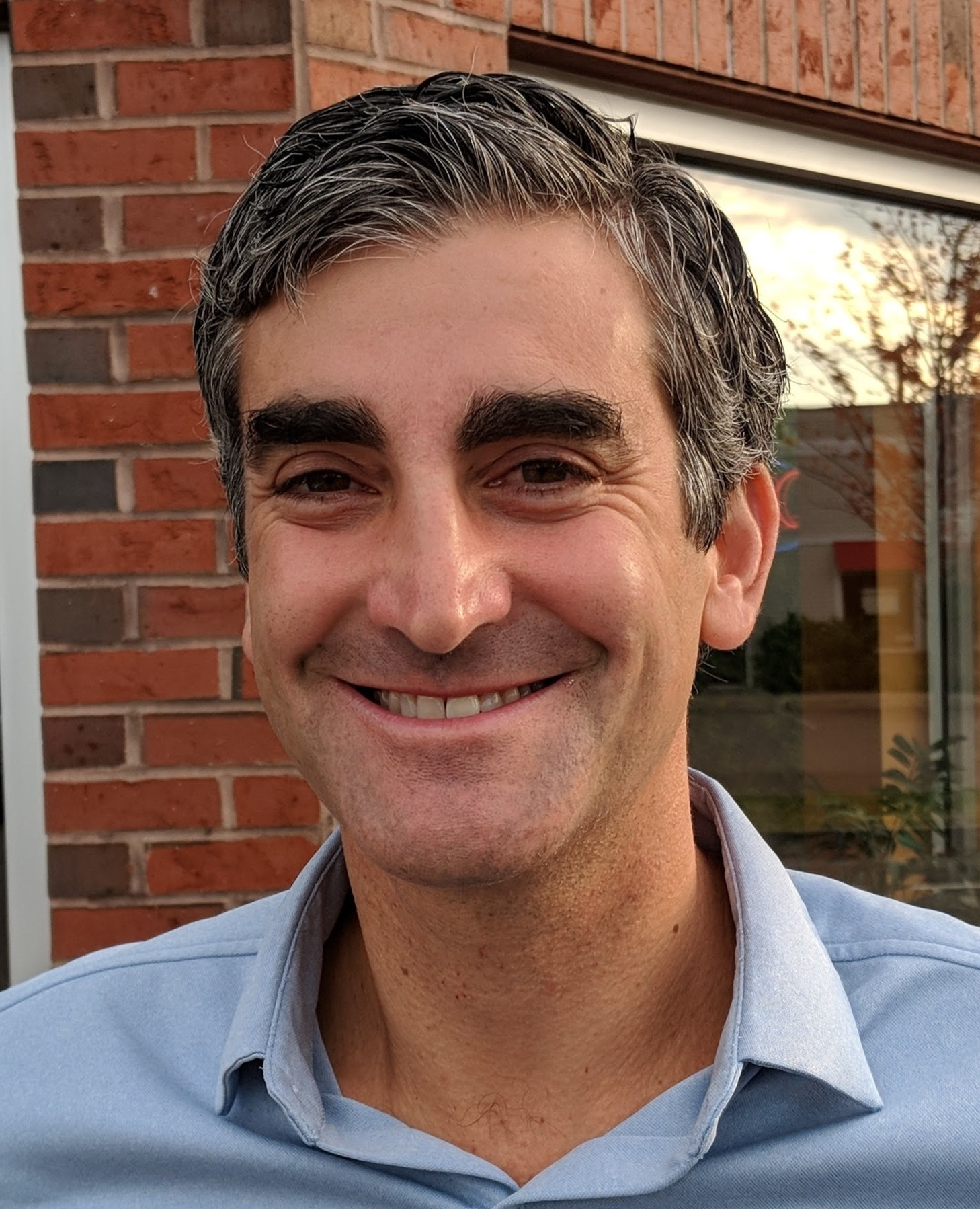

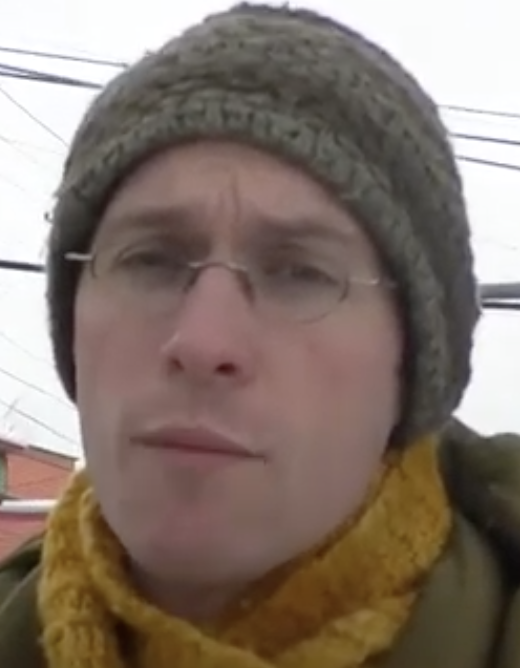

| Nominee | Miro Weinberger | Max Tracy | Ali Dieng |
| Party | Democratic | Progressive | Independent |
| Popular vote | 6,189 | 6,060 | 1,830 |
| Percentage | 42.99% | 42.09% | 12.71% |
- Results by city council district Weinberger: Weinberger—40-50% Weinberger—50-60% Tracy: Tracy—50–60% Tracy—70–80% Tracy—80-90%
Mayor before election
Miro Weinberger
Democratic
Elected mayor
Miro Weinberger
Democratic

The 2021 Burlington mayoral election was held on March 2, 2021. Incumbent Democratic Mayor Miro Weinberger defeated Progressive nominee Max Tracy, independent Ali Dieng, and various other minor candidates. Weinberger's victory by 129 votes was the smallest margin of victory in Burlington's mayoral elections since Bernie Sanders' ten vote victory in 1981.

Weinberger faced no opposition for the Democratic nomination although C.D. Mattison considered running against him. Max Tracy, the president of the city council, defeated Brian Pine, a member of the city council, for the Progressive nomination. Dieng, a member of the city council who caucused with the Progressives, and Haik Bedrosian, who had served on the city council in the 1990s and had previously ran for mayor in the 1991 election, ran as independent candidates.

Although the Progressives lost the mayoral election they retained control of the city council, which they had gained control of during the 2020 election, and saw multiple ballot initiatives endorsed by them win.

== Background ==
Democratic nominee Miro Weinberger's victory in the 2012 mayoral election made him the first Democrat to serve as Burlington, Vermont's mayor since Democratic mayoral incumbent Gordon Paquette lost to Bernie Sanders in the mayoral election of 1981. Weinberger was reelected in the 2015 and 2018 mayoral elections. The Vermont Progressive Party took control of Burlington's city council after the 2020 elections.

== Campaign ==
=== Democratic ===
Weinberger announced through an email on November 10, 2020, that he would seek reelection as mayor of Burlington. Tim Ashe, who unsuccessfully sought the Democratic nomination in 2012, declined to run in 2021.

C.D. Mattison, the vice-chair of the Burlington Democratic Party, considered running for the Democratic nomination against Weinberger, but chose not to due to him stabilizing Burlington's financial situation during his mayoralty. At the caucus she formally nominated Weinberger at the virtual caucus stating that "Miro has dedicated himself to the people of Burlington and delivered building a financially strong and nimble city. A Burlington ready to respond to the pandemic." and later served as his campaign's treasurer.

2021 Burlington Democratic mayoral caucus
| Party | Candidate | Votes | % | ±% |
|---|---|---|---|---|
| Democratic | Miro Weinberger (incumbent) | 330 | 100.00% | |
| Total votes | | 330 | 100.00% | |
| Invalid | Undervote/Abstention | 58 | | |

=== Progressive ===
Brian Pine, who served on the city council in the 1990s and since 2018, announced that he would seek the Progressive mayoral nomination. Max Tracy, the president of the city council, announced that he would seek the Progressive mayoral nomination. Tracy won the Progressive nomination against Pine at the virtual nomination caucus.

2021 Burlington Progressive mayoral caucus
| Party | Candidate | Votes | % | ±% |
|---|---|---|---|---|
| Progressive | Max Tracy | 787 | 55.50% | |
| Progressive | Brian Pine | 631 | 44.50% | |
| Total votes | | 1,418 | 100.00% | |

=== Other ===
Ali Dieng, an independent member of the city council who caucused with the Progressives, announced on November 10, 2020, that he was interested in running in the mayoral election and announced his campaign on December 7. Haik Bedrosian, who served on the city council in 1990s and had run for mayor in 1991, ran as an independent. Patrick White, Will Emmons, and Kevin McGrath ran as independents.

=== General election ===
Weinberger won the election with 6,189 votes which was only 129 more votes than Tracy's 6,060 votes. Dieng received 1,830 votes and the remainder of the candidates received less than one percent of the popular vote each. Weinberger's victory by 129 votes was the smallest margin of victory in Burlington's mayoral elections since Bernie Sanders' ten vote victory in 1981. Despite losing the mayoral election the Vermont Progressive Party retained control of the city council with six out of twelve seats and saw multiple ballot initiatives endorsed by them win.

During the campaign Weinberger raised $126,147 from 461 people, Tracy raised $63,336 from 547 people, and Dieng raised $10,920 from 115 people. Weinberger spent over $86,000 with $16,000 being spent on television ads and $10,000 being spent on mail advertising, Tracy spent over $47,770 with over $9,800 spent on brochures and over $3,000 spent on online advertising, and Dieng spent over $6,600 with over $6,600 spent on mail advertising and online fundraising software.

==== Debates ====
2021 Burlington mayoral election debates
| No. | Date & Time | Host | Moderator | Link | Participants | | | | | | |
| Key: P Participant A Absent N Non-invitee I Invitee | | | | | Democratic | Progressive | Independent | Independent | Independent | Independent | Independent |
| Key: P Participant A Absent N Non-invitee I Invitee | | | | | Miro Weinberger | Max Tracy | Haik Bedrosian | Ali Dieng | Will Emmons | Kevin McGrath | Patrick White |
|---|---|---|---|---|---|---|---|---|---|---|---|
| 1 | January 14, 2021; 7:15 p.m. EDT | Town Meeting TV | Mollie Hanigan | Video of debate | P | P | N | P | N | N | N |
| 2 | January 21, 2021 | Town Meeting TV Vermont Institute of Community and International Development; Association of Africans; Living in Vermont The Caroline Fund | Thato Ratsebe | Video of debate | P | P | N | P | N | N | P |
| 3 | February 5, 2021; 5:30 p.m. EDT | Town Meeting TV Seven Days | Sasha Goldstein Matthew Roy | Video of debate | P | P | P | P | P | P | A (Note: White was invited to the debate, but was unable to attend due to an illness.) |
| 4 | February 21, 2021; 7:30 a.m. EDT | WCAX | Darren Perron | Video of debate | P | P | N | P | N | N | N |

== Results ==
2021 Burlington mayoral election
| Party | Candidate | Votes | % | ±% |
|---|---|---|---|---|
| Democratic | Miro Weinberger (incumbent) | 6,189 | 42.99% | −5.39% |
| Progressive | Max Tracy | 6,060 | 42.09% | +7.13% |
| Independent | Ali Dieng | 1,830 | 12.71% | +12.71% |
| Independent | Kevin McGrath | 99 | 0.69% | +0.69% |
| Independent | Patrick White | 91 | 0.63% | +0.63% |
| Write-in | | 66 | 0.46% | –0.13% |
| Independent | Haik Bedrosian | 35 | 0.24% | +0.24% |
| Independent | Will Emmons | 27 | 0.19% | +0.19% |
| Total votes | | 14,397 | 100.00% | |

=== Results by ward ===
| Ward | Weinberger | Votes | Tracy | Votes | Dieng | Votes | McGrath | Votes | White | Votes | Write-ins | Votes | Bedrosian | Votes | Emmons | Votes | Total votes | Votes |
|---|---|---|---|---|---|---|---|---|---|---|---|---|---|---|---|---|---|---|
| Ward 1 | 35.04% | 535 | 54.42% | 831 | 9.43% | 144 | 0.26% | 4 | 0.39% | 6 | 0.26% | 4 | 0.13% | 2 | 0.07% | 1 | 100.00% | 1,527 |
| Ward 2 | 18.07% | 289 | 71.61% | 1,145 | 8.76% | 140 | 0.38% | 6 | 0.44% | 7 | 0.31% | 5 | 0.31% | 5 | 0.13% | 2 | 100.00% | 1,599 |
| Ward 3 | 30.74% | 562 | 55.14% | 1,008 | 11.71% | 214 | 0.49% | 9 | 0.49% | 9 | 0.27% | 5 | 0.44% | 8 | 0.72% | 13 | 100.00% | 1,828 |
| Ward 4 | 58.33% | 1,467 | 22.27% | 560 | 16.50% | 415 | 1.15% | 29 | 0.87% | 22 | 0.52% | 13 | 0.24% | 6 | 0.12% | 3 | 100.00% | 2,515 |
| Ward 5 | 51.30% | 1,144 | 36.14% | 806 | 10.6% | 237 | 0.45% | 10 | 0.54% | 12 | 0.54% | 12 | 0.18% | 4 | 0.22% | 5 | 100.00% | 2,230 |
| Ward 6 | 58.07% | 1,061 | 33.11% | 605 | 7.44% | 136 | 0.27% | 5 | 0.33% | 6 | 0.55% | 10 | 0.16% | 3 | 0.05% | 1 | 100.00% | 1,827 |
| Ward 7 | 49.73% | 1,013 | 21.11% | 430 | 25.14% | 512 | 1.67% | 34 | 1.13% | 23 | 0.54% | 11 | 0.49% | 10 | 0.20% | 4 | 100.00% | 2,037 |
| Ward 8 | 14.15% | 118 | 80.94% | 675 | 3.84% | 32 | 0.24% | 2 | 0.24% | 2 | 0.24% | 2 | 0.00% | 0 | 0.36% | 3 | 100.00% | 834 |

== Endorsements ==
Weinberger endorsements

Statewide officials

- Howard Dean, former Governor of Vermont (1991-2003)

Local officials

- Peter Clavelle, former Mayor of Burlington, Vermont (1989-1993; 1995-2006)
Tracy endorsements

Statewide officials

- Doug Hoffer, Auditor of Vermont (2013-present)
- David Zuckerman, former Lieutenant Governor of Vermont (2017-2021)

State legislators

- Brian Cina, member of the Vermont House of Representatives
- Selene Colburn, member of the Vermont House of Representatives
- Curt McCormack, member of the Vermont House of Representatives
- Emma Mulvaney-Stanak, member of the Vermont House of Representatives
- Taylor Small, member of the Vermont House of Representatives

Local officials

- Brian Pine, member of the Burlington, Vermont city council from the 3rd ward
- Zoraya Hightower, member of the Burlington, Vermont city council from the 1st ward

Organizations

- Sunrise Movement
