= Jason Lorber =

American politician

Jason P. Lorber

Member of the Vermont House of Representatives from the Chittenden-3-3 district
- In office January 2005 – January 2013
- Preceded by: Steve Hingtgen (P)

Personal details
- Born: December 10, 1966 (age 59) Philadelphia, Pennsylvania, U.S.
- Party: Democratic
- Spouse: Nathaniel G. Lew

Jason P. Lorber is a consultant, comedian and politician from Burlington, Vermont. A Democrat, he served in the Vermont House of Representatives from 2005 to 2013, representing the Chittenden-3-3 district in Burlington. He was first elected in November 2004 and did not seek re-election in 2012.

Born in Philadelphia, Pennsylvania, Lorber graduated from the University of California, Berkeley with a BA and earned a Master of Business Administration from Stanford University. He founded a business called Aplomb Consulting, which facilitates change in organizations and businesses through strategic planning, tailored workshops, executive coaching, and organizational development. Lorber works directly with Executive Directors, CEOs, board members and other leaders of businesses, not-for-profit organizations, and government agencies.

First elected to the legislature in November 2004, he was re-elected in 2006, 2008 and 2010. He served on the House Institutions & Corrections Committee, and the House Commerce and Economic Committee, and focused much of his legislative effort on prison reform. He hosted a television program called "Correcting Corrections" broadcast on CCTV Channel 17.

As a standup comedian, Lorber opened for Joan Rivers.

Lorber, his husband Nathaniel G. Lew, and their son live in Vermont.
