= Kurt Wright =

American politician (born 1956)

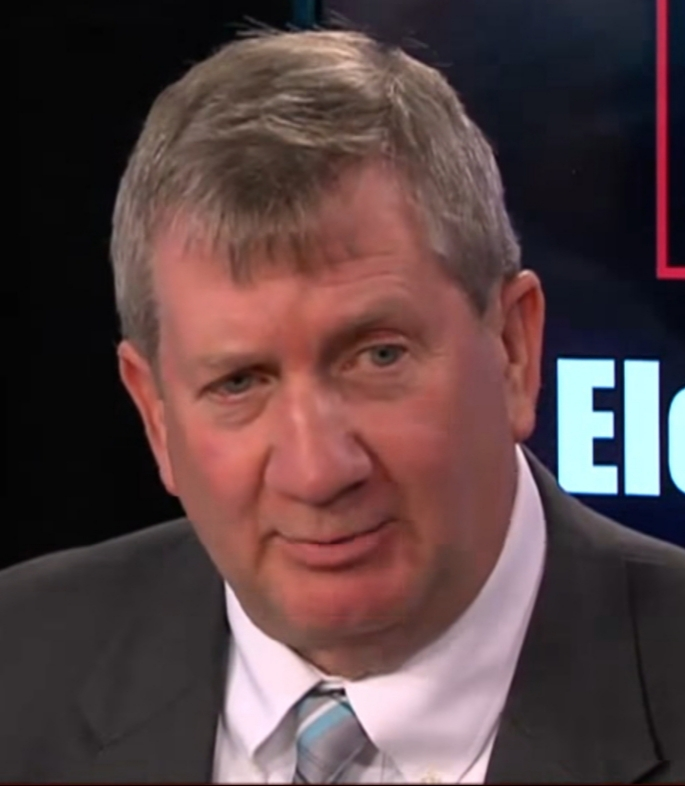
- Wright in 2018

President of the Burlington City Council
- In office April 9, 2007 – April 6, 2009
- Succeeded by: Bill Keogh
- In office April 2, 2018 – April 1, 2020
- Preceded by: Jane Knodell

Member of the Burlington City Council from Ward 4
- In office April 3, 1995 – 1999
- Preceded by: Bill Aswad
- In office April 4, 2005 – April 6, 2009
- Preceded by: Russ Ellis
- In office April 5, 2010 – April 2, 2012
- Preceded by: Russ Ellis
- In office April 7, 2014 – April 1, 2020
- Preceded by: Bryan Aubin
- Succeeded by: Sarah E. Carpenter

Member of the Vermont House of Representatives
- In office January 3, 2001 – January 9, 2019
- Preceded by: Hank Gretkowski
- Succeeded by: Robert Hooper
- Constituency: Chittenden 7-6 district (2001–2003); Chittenden 3-1 district (2003–2013); Chittenden 6-1 district (2013–2019)

Personal details
- Born: February 7, 1956 (age 70) Middlebury, Vermont, U.S.
- Party: Republican
- Spouse: Kimberly Kaye Nuttall (m. 1982)

Kurt Wright (born February 7, 1956) is an American politician who served in the Vermont House of Representatives from 2001 to 2019, and on Burlington, Vermont's city council intermittently between 1995 and 2020. He was president of the city council from 2007 to 2009, and 2018 to 2020. He is the last Republican to serve on Burlington's city council and to represent it in the state house.

Born in Middlebury, Vermont, Wright moved to Burlington, Vermont, and managed multiple stores before becoming active in local politics. He worked for Peter Brownell's mayoral campaign in 1993, member of local committees, chair of the city's Republican committee, field director for Ruth Dwyer during the 1998 gubernatorial election, and a delegate to the 2004 Republican National Convention.

Wright unsuccessfully ran for a seat in the Vermont House of Representatives and Vermont Senate in 1994 and 1996, but was elected to the state house in 2000, where he would serve until his defeat in 2018. He was first elected to the city council in 1995, and stepped down three times to unsuccessfully run for mayor in 1999, 2009, and 2012. During his councilor tenure he was selected to serve as president, the first Republican since Ted Riehle in 1987.

== Early life ==
Kurt Wright was born in Middlebury, Vermont, on February 7, 1956, to Samuel Barrows and Kent Wright. He graduated from Vergennes Union High School in 1974, and took business courses at Champlain College. He married Kimberly Kaye Nuttall on October 9, 1982.

== Local and party politics ==
Wright worked for Peter Brownell's campaign during the 1993 mayoral election. He was a member of the Ward 4 Neighborhood Planning Assembly in Burlington, Vermont, and co-chair of the Ward 4 Republican Committee in the 1990s. He served as a justice of the peace and chaired the Burlington Republican Committee.

During the 1998 gubernatorial election Wright was a field director for Ruth Dwyer. He supported John McCain during the 2000 presidential primaries and Marco Rubio during the 2016 presidential primaries. The Vermont Republican Party state convention selected Wright as one of the state's delegates to the 2004 Republican National Convention.

== City council and mayoralty ==
=== Elections ===
In 1995, Wright ran for a seat on the Burlington city council from the 4th ward, defeating Democratic incumbent Bill Aswad who had beaten Wright for a seat in the Vermont House of Representatives the prior year. Wright was reelected in 1997.

Wright returned to the city council when he defeated Democratic incumbent Russ Ellis in the 4th ward in 2005, and defeated Democratic nominee Jim Holway in 2007. Ellis, an incumbent again in 2010, was defeated by Wright who filed to run five minutes before the deadline.

Incumbent Bryan Aubin declined to seek reelection in 2014, and Wright defeated Democratic nominee Carol Ode and Libertarian nominee Loyal Ploof in 2014, and faced no opposition in 2018. He declined to run for reelection in 2020, as Federal Communications Commission would require him to leave his radio show for two months. Wright, starting in 2014, was the last Republican elected to the city council.

Wright ran for mayor in 1999, 2009, and 2012 rather than seek reelection to the city council, but lost to Peter Clavelle, Bob Kiss, and Miro Weinberger. He declined to run for mayor in 1997, and regretted not running for mayor in 2006. Weinberger was endorsed by Wright during the 2018 mayoral election.

=== Tenure ===
During Wright's tenure he served on the Finance Board and chaired the Ordinance committee. In 2007, Wright defeated Progressive Tim Ashe in an 8 to 6 vote to become president of the city council, the first Republican to do so since Ted Riehle in 1987. He was reelected president in 2008, defeating Ellis by a vote of 8 to 6, with Ashe supporting Wright. Wright attempted to defeat Progressive Bill Keogh, who was seeking a third term as president, in 2011, but withdrew after he failed to assemble enough support. Jane Knodell, the outgoing Progressive president of the city council, nominated Wright, the sole Republican member, to succeed her in 2018, and he was approved without opposition.

The police were called by Wright on March 12, 2009, after councilors Ed Adrian and Dave Berezniak conducted procedural interruptions. He threatened to have them removed if they continued to raise points of order. The council was debating zoning issues, and the Democrats wanted to delay the discussion until after the new Democratic-controlled council was sworn in on April 6. The American Civil Liberties Union criticized Wright's actions during the meeting while Progressive councilors Ashe and Jane Knodell supported him. Berezniak made a complaint to the City Attorney Ken Schatz.

=== State legislature ===
Wright ran for a seat in the Vermont House of Representatives in 1994, but lost to Democratic nominees Aswad and Carmel Babcock. He requested a recount, but his vote total did not change after it. Wright announced on July 11, 1996, that he would run for one of the six seats in the Vermont Senate from the Chittenden District, but he placed 10th in the general election after spending $20,684.

Wright was elected to the state house in 2000, and placed first in every election from 2000 to 2014, second in 2016, and third in 2018. He was elected alongside Democratic nominees Aswad, Joanna Cole, and Carol Ode. At the time of his defeat he was the last Republican to represent Burlington in the state house.

Wright was appointed to the Government Operations committee in 2001, and the General, Housing and Military Affairs committee in 2005. David Sunderland defeated Wright and Joseph L. Krawczyk Jr. for the position of assistant Republican leader in 2004. Wright cosponsored a 2006 resolution calling for Judge Edward Cashman to resign after his sentencing in a child molestation case.

== Personal life ==
Wright moved to Burlington, in 1978. He managed Kerry's Kwik Shop from 1978 to 2002, and Kerry's Pizza. The Vermont Lake Monsters employed him in advertising and sales in the 2000s. He was a radio host for WVMT from 2019 to 2025.

== Political positions ==
Wright stated that he was far-right when he joined the city council, but moved towards the center and became a moderate conservative by 2008. He lamented the lack of centrist and fiscal conservative representation in Burlington after he lost reelection to the state house in 2018. He called for Bernie Sanders to be impeached in 1991. A city council resolution condemning the Contract with America in 1995, was opposed by Wright. The National Rifle Association endorsed him in 2008.

Legislation in 1996 to prohibit candidates and campaign workers from collecting and turning in absentee ballots was proposed by Wright, but the city council voted 9 to 3 against it. In 2001, he proposed legislation to create a statewide referendum system. He sponsored legislation to have Vermont join the National Popular Vote Interstate Compact. Burlington's use of ranked voting in the 2000s was criticized by Wright.

A proposal to raise Burlington's capital borrowing limit from $250,000 to $750,000 in 1996, was opposed by Wright. In 2015, Wright proposed legislation in the state house to prohibit strikes by teachers, but it failed by one vote. An amendment to have Vermont's minimum wage rise to $10.10 occur over the course of three years rather than one was proposed by Wright in 2014, and voted against raising Burlington's minimum wage to $13.94 in 2015.

In 2002, Wright voted in favor of anti-flag desecration legislation for the flag of the United States. He supported the Iraq War. He voted against legislation in 2007 to allow euthanasia for terminally ill patients. In 2009, he voted in favor of recognizing same-sex marriages and to overturn Governor Jim Douglas' veto of the legislation.

An anti-sanctuary city resolution for the city council was sponsored by Wright in 2006. Burlington's city council passed a resolution calling for a boycott against Arizona and its businesses due to Arizona SB 1070, but Wright voted against the resolution. He voted against placing an advisory question in the 2014 city ballot on whether non-citizens should be allowed to vote in Vermont.

== Electoral history ==
Electoral history of Kurt Wright
Year	Office	Party	Primary			General			Result	Ref.
Year	Office	Party	Total	%	P.	Total	%	P.	Result	Ref.
1994	Vermont House of Representatives (Chittenden 7-6)	Republican	223	93.31%	1st	1,571	32.59%	3rd	Lost	
1995	Burlington City Council (4th)	Republican	No primary			1,245	57.48%	1st	Won	
1996	Vermont Senate (Chittenden)	Republican	2,955	11.23%	6th	19,621	7.23%	10th	Lost	
1997	Burlington City Council (4th)	Republican	No primary			1,018	60.99%	1st	Won	
1999	Mayor of Burlington	Republican	No primary			3,835	38.58%	2nd	Lost	
2000	Vermont House of Representatives (Chittenden 7-6)	Republican	727	54.91%	1st	1,863	28.63%	1st	Won	
2002	Vermont House of Representatives (Chittenden 3-1)	Republican	196	54.29%	1st	1,687	29.91%	1st	Won	
2004	Vermont House of Representatives (Chittenden 3-1)	Republican	207	56.71%	1st	2,117	29.94%	1st	Won	
2005	Burlington City Council (4th)	Republican	No primary			908	53.35%	1st	Won	
2006	Vermont House of Representatives (Chittenden 3-1)	Republican	509	93.05%	1st	1,778	28.56%	1st	Won	
2007	Burlington City Council (4th)	Republican	No primary			650	55.84%	1st	Won	
2008	Vermont House of Representatives (Chittenden 3-1)	Republican	185	86.05%	1st	2,196	32.57%	1st	Won	
2009	Mayor of Burlington	Republican	No primary			4,061	48.50%	2nd	Lost	
2010	Burlington City Council (4th)	Republican	No primary			1,087	60.09%	1st	Won	
2010	Vermont House of Representatives (Chittenden 3-1)	Republican	277	94.54%	1st	1,806	39.18%	1st	Won	
2012	Mayor of Burlington	Republican	No primary			3,746	36.98%	2nd	Lost	
2012	Vermont House of Representatives (Chittenden 6-1)	Republican	116	85.93%	1st	2,332	36.86%	1st	Won	
2014	Vermont House of Representatives (Chittenden 6-1)	Republican	264	61.97%	1st	1,598	30.95%	1st	Won	
2014	Burlington City Council (4th)	Republican	No primary			1,089	59.44%	1st	Won	
2016	Vermont House of Representatives (Chittenden 6-1)	Republican	478	64.42%	1st	2,135	34.08%	2nd	Won	
2018	Burlington City Council (4th)	Republican	No primary			1,516	91.77%	1st	Won	
2018	Vermont House of Representatives (Chittenden 6-1)	Republican	303	93.52%	1st	1,833	28.08%	3rd	Lost	

== Works cited ==
=== Election reports ===
- "1994 State Representative General Election". Secretary of State of Vermont. Archived from the original on February 28, 2025.
- "1994 State Representative Republican Primary". Secretary of State of Vermont. Archived from the original on February 28, 2025.
- "1996 State Senator General Election". Secretary of State of Vermont. Archived from the original on February 28, 2025.
- "1996 State Senator Republican Primary". Secretary of State of Vermont. Archived from the original on February 28, 2025.
- "2000 State Representative General Election". Secretary of State of Vermont. Archived from the original on March 3, 2025.
- "2000 State Representative Republican Primary". Secretary of State of Vermont. Archived from the original on March 3, 2025.
- "2002 State Representative General Election". Secretary of State of Vermont. Archived from the original on March 3, 2025.
- "2002 State Representative Republican Primary". Secretary of State of Vermont. Archived from the original on March 3, 2025.
- "2004 State Representative General Election". Secretary of State of Vermont. Archived from the original on March 3, 2025.
- "2004 State Representative Republican Primary". Secretary of State of Vermont. Archived from the original on March 3, 2025.
- "2006 State Representative General Election". Secretary of State of Vermont. Archived from the original on March 3, 2025.
- "2006 State Representative Republican Primary". Secretary of State of Vermont. Archived from the original on March 3, 2025.
- "2008 State Representative General Election". Secretary of State of Vermont. Archived from the original on March 3, 2025.
- "2008 State Representative Republican Primary". Secretary of State of Vermont. Archived from the original on March 3, 2025.
- "2009 Burlington Mayor Election Tuesday, March 3, 2009". Burlington, Vermont. Archived from the original on July 25, 2011.
- "2010 State Representative General Election". Secretary of State of Vermont. Archived from the original on March 3, 2025.
- "2010 State Representative Republican Primary". Secretary of State of Vermont. Archived from the original on March 3, 2025.
- "2012 State Representative General Election". Secretary of State of Vermont. Archived from the original on March 3, 2025.
- "2012 State Representative Republican Primary". Secretary of State of Vermont. Archived from the original on March 3, 2025.
- "2014 State Representative General Election". Secretary of State of Vermont. Archived from the original on March 3, 2025.
- "2014 State Representative Republican Primary". Secretary of State of Vermont. Archived from the original on March 3, 2025.
- "2016 State Representative General Election". Secretary of State of Vermont. Archived from the original on March 3, 2025.
- "2016 State Representative Republican Primary". Secretary of State of Vermont. Archived from the original on March 3, 2025.
- "2018 State Representative General Election". Secretary of State of Vermont. Archived from the original on March 3, 2025.
- "2018 State Representative Republican Primary". Secretary of State of Vermont. Archived from the original on March 3, 2025.
- "City of Burlington - Unofficial Results of 2012 Annual City Election". Burlington, Vermont. Archived from the original on March 12, 2025.
- "Election Summary Report". Burlington, Vermont. Archived from the original on March 1, 2025.
- "Official Results of 2014 Annual City Election". Burlington, Vermont. Archived from the original on September 23, 2024.
- Statement of Votes Annual City Election (Report). Burlington, Vermont. March 2, 1999.

=== Newspapers ===
- "Boycott". Rutland Herald. January 19, 2006. p. A5 – via Newspapers.com.
- "Chittenden spending". The Burlington Free Press. August 14, 2000. p. 8A – via Newspapers.com.
- "Conventions". Rutland Herald. May 23, 2004. p. D2 – via Newspapers.com.
- "Council condemns Contract with America". The Burlington Free Press. May 9, 1995. p. 5B – via Newspapers.com.
- "Council: Democrats gain". The Burlington Free Press. March 5, 1997. p. 2B – via Newspapers.com.
- "Council rejects ballot restriction". The Burlington Free Press. February 6, 1996. p. 3B – via Newspapers.com.
- "Council to get organized". The Burlington Free Press. April 7, 2008. p. 1B – via Newspapers.com.
- "Farewell to three councilors". The Burlington Free Press. April 1, 2014. p. A14 – via Newspapers.com.
- "Flag: Lawmakers pass anti-desecration resolution". The Burlington Free Press. January 11, 2002. p. 10A – via Newspapers.com.
- "GOP House candidates seeks recount". The Burlington Free Press. November 10, 1994. p. 4B – via Newspapers.com.
- "House committees". The Burlington Free Press. January 10, 2001. p. 5A – via Newspapers.com.
- "House Committees". Rutland Herald. January 8, 2005. p. A4 – via Newspapers.com.
- "House race results hold in recount". The Burlington Free Press. November 22, 1994. p. 4B – via Newspapers.com.
- "House vote on veto override". The Burlington Free Press. April 8, 2009. p. 5A – via Newspapers.com.
- "How they voted: House roll call". The Burlington Free Press. March 22, 2007. p. 4A – via Newspapers.com.
- "Incumbent Mayor Miro Weinberger announces endorsements". The Burlington Free Press. January 19, 2006. p. A12 – via Newspapers.com.
- "Kurt Wright Profile". The Burlington Free Press. October 24, 2006. p. 2B – via Newspapers.com.
- "New council sworn in for session". The Burlington Free Press. April 8, 2008. p. 1B – via Newspapers.com.
- "New North End House race takes shape". The Burlington Free Press. October 1, 1994. p. 4B – via Newspapers.com.
- "Nuttall - Wright". The Burlington Free Press. August 7, 1982. p. 8A – via Newspapers.com.
- "Progressives hold council". The Burlington Free Press. March 8, 1995. p. 1B – via Newspapers.com.
- "Rally supports U.S. troops". The Burlington Free Press. March 31, 2003. p. 3B – via Newspapers.com.
- "Ruth Dwyer". The Burlington Free Press. October 25, 1998. p. 7A – via Newspapers.com.
- "Same-sex marriage roll call". The Burlington Free Press. April 3, 2009. p. 5A – via Newspapers.com.
- "Store manager runs for House". The Burlington Free Press. July 10, 1994. p. 3B – via Newspapers.com.
- "Veto". Rutland Herald. July 12, 2007. p. A6 – via Newspapers.com.
- "Voting practice under question". The Burlington Free Press. February 5, 1996. p. 1B – via Newspapers.com.
- "Wright - Nuttall". The Burlington Free Press. November 8, 1982. p. 11A – via Newspapers.com.
- Aloe, Jess (April 4, 2018). "Lone Republican Wright elected Burlington Council president". The Burlington Free Press. p. 7A – via Newspapers.com.
- Aloe, Jess (November 8, 2018). "VT Insights: After Kurt Wright's loss, does GOP have future in Burlington?". The Burlington Free Press.
- Baird, Joel (February 1, 2012). "Mayor: Republican Wright has more money on hand". The Burlington Free Press. p. 4A – via Newspapers.com.
- Baird, Joel (January 23, 2012). "Progressives skip mayoral race". The Burlington Free Press. p. 1B – via Newspapers.com.
- Baird, Joel (September 21, 2011). "Wright: Republican runs for mayor". The Burlington Free Press. p. 8A – via Newspapers.com.
- Baird, Joel (September 21, 2011). "Wright to run on 'credibility'". The Burlington Free Press. p. 1A – via Newspapers.com.
- Barlow, Daniel (April 9, 2008). "House panel favors bill to back popular vote in presidential race". Rutland Herald. p. B7 – via Newspapers.com.
- Briggs, John (January 21, 2009). "5 council incumbents bow out". The Burlington Free Press. p. 1B – via Newspapers.com.
- Briggs, John (June 15, 2010). "City takes Arizona stand". The Burlington Free Press. p. 1B – via Newspapers.com.
- Briggs, John (March 14, 2009). "Cops at council stirs debate". The Burlington Free Press. p. 1B – via Newspapers.com.
- Briggs, John (March 14, 2009). "Council: Police visit causes controversy". The Burlington Free Press. p. 4B – via Newspapers.com.
- Briggs, John (June 27, 2006). "Council: Sanctuary resolution dropped". The Burlington Free Press. p. 3B – via Newspapers.com.
- Briggs, John (March 13, 2009). "Councilor calls the cops". The Burlington Free Press. p. 1A – via Newspapers.com.
- Briggs, John (February 21, 2010). "Ellis, Wright face off in Ward 4". The Burlington Free Press. p. 1C – via Newspapers.com.
- Briggs, John (March 2, 2005). "GOP adds City Council seat". The Burlington Free Press. p. 1B – via Newspapers.com.
- Briggs, John (March 7, 2007). "Republicans gain council seat". The Burlington Free Press. p. 2B – via Newspapers.com.
- Briggs, John (December 12, 2008). "Republican Wright announces candidacy for mayor". The Burlington Free Press. p. 1B – via Newspapers.com.
- Briggs, John (March 19, 2011). "Wright out of council president race". The Burlington Free Press. p. 1B – via Newspapers.com.
- Briggs, John (January 26, 2010). "Wright seeks council seat". The Burlington Free Press. p. 1B – via Newspapers.com.
- Briggs, John (March 12, 2008). "Wright seeks return as council president". The Burlington Free Press. p. 1B – via Newspapers.com.
- Briggs, John (April 15, 2007). "Wright vows to work with all parties". The Burlington Free Press. p. 1C – via Newspapers.com.
- Briggs, John (March 23, 2009). "Zoning comments sought". The Burlington Free Press. p. 6A – via Newspapers.com.
- Burbank, April (October 22, 2014). "Burlington to be polled on non-citizen voting". The Burlington Free Press. p. A14 – via Newspapers.com.
- Carroll, Joe (May 2, 2025). "Popular WVMT radio host Kurt Wright to retire". WCAX-TV. Archived from the original on October 22, 2025.
- Despart, Zach (May 19, 2015). "Council OKs livable wage resolution". The Burlington Free Press. p. 11A – via Newspapers.com.
- Guma, Greg (December 18, 2011). "Kurt Wright: Downplaying GOP affiliation, banking on experience in bid for Burlington mayor". VTDigger. Archived from the original on February 28, 2025.
- Hallenbeck, Terri (April 9, 2014). "House backs $10.10 minimum wage by 2015". The Burlington Free Press. p. 17A – via Newspapers.com.
- Hallenbeck, Terri (January 11, 2006). "Legislature might call for Cashman's resignation". The Burlington Free Press. p. 4A – via Newspapers.com.
- Lush, Tamara (February 24, 1997). "Three issues key in Ward 4 race". The Burlington Free Press. p. 1B – via Newspapers.com.
- Iyengar, Sona (July 12, 1996). "Brownell runs for Senate". The Burlington Free Press. p. 1B – via Newspapers.com.
- Iyengar, Sona (September 17, 1996). "Council requests boost in borrowing". The Burlington Free Press. p. 1B – via Newspapers.com.
- Iyengar, Sona (October 27, 1997). "Council to consider tougher laws". The Burlington Free Press. p. 1B – via Newspapers.com.
- Iyengar, Sona (February 23, 1994). "Incumbents battle in Ward 4 race". The Burlington Free Press. p. 3B – via Newspapers.com.
- Iyengar, Sona (January 3, 1997). "Wright won't run for mayor". The Burlington Free Press. p. 1B – via Newspapers.com.
- Remsen, Nancy (April 5, 2001). "Citizen initiatives debated". The Burlington Free Press. p. 1B – via Newspapers.com.
- Remsen, Nancy (December 13, 2004). "GOP picks House leaders". The Burlington Free Press. p. 1B – via Newspapers.com.
- Wild, Kendall (October 22, 2008). "How the NRA wants you to vote". Rutland Herald. p. A5 – via Newspapers.com.
- Wright, Kurt (February 18, 1991). "Impeach Bernie". The Burlington Free Press. p. 13A – via Newspapers.com.
- Wright, Kurt (January 10, 2012). "Kurt Wright". The Burlington Free Press. p. 7B – via Newspapers.com.
- Wright, Leslie (December 15, 1998). "Councilor to run for mayor". The Burlington Free Press. p. 1B – via Newspapers.com.
- Wright, Leslie (February 22, 1999). "Wright: Councilor mounts challenge". The Burlington Free Press. p. 6A – via Newspapers.com.

=== News ===
- Bradley, Pat (December 12, 2019). "Burlington City Council President Discusses Decision Not To Seek Reelection". WAMC. Archived from the original on March 1, 2025.
- Bradley, Pat (September 19, 2017). "GOP Legislators To Introduce Strike-Limiting Legislation". WAMC. Archived from the original on March 1, 2025.
- Bradley, Pat (December 6, 2019). "Vermont City Council President Will Not Seek Re-Election". WAMC. Archived from the original on March 1, 2025.
- Heintz, Paul (November 7, 2018). "About Last Night: Seven Days' Full Coverage of Vermont's 2018 Elections". Seven Days. Archived from the original on August 1, 2021.
- Jickling, Katie (February 7, 2018). "The Elephant in the Room: Are Burlington Republicans a Dying Breed?". Seven Days. Archived from the original on September 13, 2024.
- LaMarche, Kolby (January 15, 2026). "City moves to dismiss GOP suit over Voter Registration Board composition". Burlington Daily News. Archived from the original on January 27, 2026.
- McCullum, April (February 24, 2016). "30 Vermont legislators to endorse Marco Rubio". The Burlington Free Press.

=== Web ===
- "Kurt Wright's Biography". Vote Smart.
- "Official Results of the 2010 Annual City Election". Burlington, Vermont. Archived from the original on September 23, 2024.
