= Burlington School Food Project =

The Burlington School Food Project (BSFP) is a collaborative effort in Burlington, Vermont, United States, to connect schoolchildren and their families with nearby farms by bringing more fresh local foods to cafeterias and more hands-on agriculture education to classrooms. BSFP is a nationally recognized initiative and has been featured in The New York Times and Time for Kids.

== Goals ==
The goals of the Burlington School Food Project are to:

- Build the capacity for Burlington to better meet the food needs of students
- Increase awareness and encourage healthy food choices for children and their families
- Improve Burlington School District access to food from local farms

== Project partners ==
The Burlington School Food Project partners include the Burlington Schools Food Service of the Burlington School District, Vermont FEED, Shelburne Farms' Sustainable Schools Project, the Burlington Legacy Project, the Intervale Center, and the University of Vermont. BSFP is overseen by the Burlington Food Council, a group with 30 active members and over 60 supporters, including farmers, parents, school district employees, educators, students, researchers, and health and nutrition experts.
