= Howard Center =

American mental health organization

- Type: Nonprofit organization
- Industry: Community mental health, substance abuse, educational, and developmental services
- Founded: 1865 (Chittenden County, Vermont, U.S.)
- Headquarters: Burlington, Vermont, U.S.
- Area served: Vermont counties of Chittenden, Franklin, Grand Isle, and Rutland
- Key people: Sandra McGuire, CEO
- Website: Official website

Howard Center is a Burlington, Vermont-based nonprofit organization that offers professional crisis and counseling services to children and adults; supportive services to individuals with autism and developmental disabilities who need help with education, employment, and life maintenance skills; counseling and medical services for those struggling with substance use disorders; and interventions and supports for adults with serious and persistent mental health challenges in Chittenden County, Vermont's most populous county. Howard Center collaborates with many community partners and is a United Way of Northwest Vermont-funded agency.

Services and supports are community-based and provided in more than 60 locations, including area schools, hospitals, emergency rooms, and client homes, in addition to Howard Center offices and residential homes. In 2018, Howard Center's professional staff of 1,500 helped more than 16,000 people, primarily in Chittenden County but also in the other Vermont counties of Franklin, Grand Isle, and Rutland. In 2024, Howard Center helped 19,000 individuals.

== History ==
Tracing its roots to the 1865 founding of the Home for Destitute Children, Howard Center is the largest of Vermont's designated agencies representing Vermont's mental health care system.

In 1966, the Howard Center for Human Services received its designation as the community mental health center for Chittenden County under the federal Community Mental Health Act of 1963.

In 1994, the Howard Center for Human Services merged with Champlain Drug and Alcohol Services and the Baird Center for Children and Families (a successor of the Home for Destitute Children) into one organization, forming today's Howard Center.

== Crisis services ==
The organization maintains First Call for Chittenden County, a 24/7 crisis hotline for Chittenden County residents experiencing a non-medical crisis. In 2024, Howard Center opened a Mental Health Urgent Care in Burlington. Howard Center also operates outreach teams in Burlington and the surrounding communities.

== Specialized programs ==
The organization operates three therapeutic schools:

- The Baird School, Burlington, provides an alternative educational environment for children ages 5–15 in grades K-8.
- Jean Garvin School in Williston provides a therapeutic educational program offering learning opportunities to inspire personal change and well-being for adolescents, ages 12–8 in grades 7–12.
- Fay Honey Knopp Memorial School in the city of Rutland is a licensed school that provides educational, therapeutic, and transition services to residents of HowardCenter's Park Street Program for adolescent males with sexual harming behaviors.
- School Services: Howard Center's School Services Program helps children ages 3 to 22—and their families—who face a broad range of challenges that may impact learning and school behavior.
- Howard Center supports clients in recovery from substance use.

When the Chittenden Clinic was established in 2002, it was the first medication assisted treatment clinic for opioid addiction in Vermont. From July 1, 2017, through June 30, 2018, the clinic provided treatment and support to 1,342 individuals.

Safe Recovery serves people who are currently using cocaine, heroin, or who are in early recovery from opioid dependence. Services include syringe exchange, low-barrier distribution to buprenorphine, fentanyl test strips, drug treatment options counseling, HIV and hepatitis C testing and referrals, hepatitis A and B vaccination, distribution of Naloxone overdose rescue kits, corrections outreach, basic needs assistance, advocacy, and other recovery support services. From July 1, 2017, through June 30, 2018, 1,236 individuals visited Safe Recovery. In December 2013, Safe Recovery began distributing Naloxone kits to reverse overdoses from opioids. Since then, 1,357 overdose reversals have been reported from the kits the program distributed.

Although the goal of all Howard Center programs is to help individuals and families live healthy lives as independently as possible, several programs provide specific support for individuals with intellectual disabilities including autism.

- The Safety Connection program helps adults with intellectual disabilities or autism live independently in the community setting of their choice. The program assists youth in transition, single adults and families, and elders who wish to age in place. Safety Connection works with clients and their support teams which may include both Howard Center staff and community partners. A Safety Connection team collaborates with all partners to build an individualized independent living program, combining home-based monitoring technologies with clinically trained staff monitors and responders.
- The SUCCEED program is a post-secondary education program for students with intellectual disabilities and autism, provided by Howard Center in collaboration with area colleges.
- Project SEARCH helps school age adults who have developmental disabilities find meaningful employment.
- Project HIRE provides career development and employment support and assistance to individuals with developmental disabilities.

Howard Center programs serving those with mental health concerns include the following:

- Community Support Program serves Chittenden County adults with severe and/or persistent mental health challenges who meet eligibility requirements set by the state. Clinical staff provide assessment, care management, supportive counseling, employment services, housing assistance, residential services, social and recreational opportunities, medical evaluation, and psychiatric consultation.

== Clients served and community impact ==
Howard Center serves a yearly average of over 10,000 clients in Chittenden County. Some of the programs and services for these clients include:

- Crisis Services
- Outpatient Services
- Medication Assisted Treatment (MAT)
- Residential Services
- School Based Services
- Community Based Support
- Employment Programs

In addition, Howard Center annually provides support to thousands of individuals in the community who receive services (particularly through 24/7 crisis services) without officially enrolling as a client.

Several Howard Center programs offer treatment and support services that reduce the request for services from other city organizations and departments. For example, Howard Center's Street Outreach and Community Outreach Programs reduce reliance on the police to respond to calls in the downtown area that are primarily the result of social service needs.

== Awards ==
The center has been recognized by the following organizations:

- The National Council for Mental Wellbeing awarded Howard Center with the 2019 Excellence in Addictions Treatment Award at the annual NatCon conference.
- The Greater Burlington YMCA recognized Howard Center with their annual award for the organization's continued service to clients and the impact of their work. (May 2015)
- KidSafe Collaborative's Annual Outstanding Service Awards presented the Gregory Packan Esq. Award for Outstanding Children's Advocacy to a Howard Center School Social Worker. (May 2015)
- The National Committee for Quality Assurance (NCQA) recognized Howard Center's medication assisted treatment program as a Patient-Centered Specialty Practice, the first outpatient treatment program in the nation to gain this level of recognition. (March 2015)
- Jackson Healthcare Hospital Charitable Services Program of Excellence Awards named Howard Center's Street Outreach Program as one of 10 programs nationwide to receive a $10,000 award.
- National Council for Behavioral Health's 2014-2015 Addressing Health Disparities Leadership Program selected First Call Director as one of 25 participants nationwide to participate in the leadership program. (October 2014)
- The Governor's Criminal Justice and Substance Abuse Cabinet appointed Howard Center's Chief Executive Officer to serve on the committee and a member of Howard Center's board of trustees to serve as chair. (September 2014)

== Accreditation ==
Howard Center's Chittenden Clinic, which provide medication assisted treatment for individuals with opioid dependence, received a three-year accreditation in 2015 from CARF International (formerly known as the Commission of Accreditation of Rehabilitation Facilities). The clinic is affiliated with the University of Vermont Medical Center. The Clinic's CARF accreditation was renewed in 2023.

== Affiliations and partnerships ==
In addition to the programs and services offered by Howard Center, the agency collaborates with numerous community partners to expand the support it offers to individuals and communities. Key examples include:

- City of Burlington Police Department and the University of Vermont Medical Center: Street Outreach Program.
- Central Vermont Substance Abuse Services: CVSAS is the designated substance abuse service agency providing effective alcohol and other drug outpatient and intensive outpatient treatment services for the Greater Washington County area. CVSAS offers services for adults and adolescents and their families.
- Collaborative Solutions Corporation/Second Spring is a licensed, residential treatment facility helping its residents develop and implement personal recovery plans that will help them become independent.
- Howard Center is a funded agency of the United Way of Chittenden County.

== Organization ==
The organization has a budget of $129 million. Over 90% of services are state-funded.

In 2014, Vermont Business Magazine ranked Howard Center as the 11th largest employer in the state of Vermont by employee roster.

The president of Howard Center was Kelly Deforge as of 2024.

Sandra McGuire, MBA, has been appointed as the new chief executive officer of Howard Center, effective June 1, 2024.
