= Burlington Telecom =

Telecommunications company in Vermont, US

- Industry: telecommunications company
- Founded: 2003
- Area served: Burlington, VT
- Website: burlingtontelecom.com

Burlington Telecom is a municipal telecommunications company providing residents of Burlington, Vermont with television, telephone and internet services. The company runs its communications offerings on a citywide fiber-optic network.

== History ==
A home network connecting every residence and business of Burlington was conceived in the 1980s. There were a number of failed attempts in the 1990s. A funding source could not be found. An experienced telecommunications expert, Tim Nulty, was hired as a consultant by the city. Nulty became General Manager of the newly created Burlington Telecom, a division of the city government. The network was laid in stages. The first stage was finished and profitable by 2003. The first and second stages became profitable by 2006. This led local government officials to believe the project would result in a major funding source for public coffers in the future.

In September 2009 Burlington informed the Vermont Public Service Board it had used $17 million in city money to support Burlington Telecom operations since early 2008. The failure to repay that loan was a violation of Burlington Telecom's state license. The revelation prompted a forensic audit of Burlington Telecom by the Public Service Department and, in early 2010, a criminal referral to the Vermont Attorney General. Two private citizens also filed suit in Chittenden Superior Court in Burlington to compel Burlington Telecom to repay the $17 million.

A special committee created by the City Council and including four citizens experienced in finance or telecommunications concluded in January 2010 that Burlington Telecom was unable to support its debt load. In mid-February 2010, Burlington Telecom defaulted on an interest payment of $386,000 to its commercial lender, CitiLeasing.

On March 11, 2019, the city council of Burlington approved the sale of the company to Champlain Broadband a subsidiary of privately held Schurz Communications. The sale will help the city to recover $7 million in taxpayer funds. Some of the sales proceeds of a total of $30.8 million will be used to repay loans of Citibank and Blue Water Holdings.

In 2026, Burlington Telecom announced that Mike Callahan would be the new president and general manager.

== Controversy ==
=== Al Jazeera ===
Burlington Telecom offered local channels and free channel offerings on cable. In January 2007, Al Jazeera English was added to the cable lineup as Burlington Telecom did not have to pay for the network's feed.

In 2008, the company encountered controversy when it attempted to remove Al Jazeera English (since replaced in the United States with Al Jazeera America) from its basic offerings. After Burlington Telecom decided the channel would be removed from all cable package offerings, the city council and then-Mayor Bob Kiss delayed the decision for discussion. A public meeting on the issue of Al Jazeera English's removal was aired on the international network. After two public meetings, an oversight committee for Burlington Telecom decided the channel would continue to be offered in certain cable packages.

=== Bond ===
In 2010, the company was unable to pay the $1.5 million interest on its bonds. It also owed the city of Burlington $17 million. As a result, Moody's downrated the debt for the city two notches to A2, "upper medium" from Aa3, "high quality." Moody's also downrated the credit rating for Burlington International Airport. The Vermont Public Service Commission has asked for a criminal investigation. The general manager resigned.
