= Bob Kiss =

American politician (born 1947)

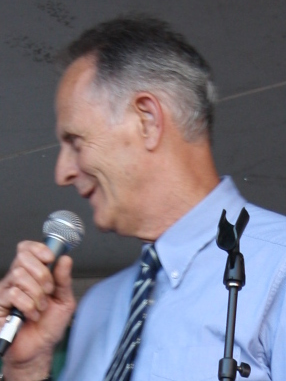
- Kiss in 2010

41st Mayor of Burlington, Vermont
- In office April 1, 2006 – April 1, 2012
- Preceded by: Peter Clavelle
- Succeeded by: Miro Weinberger

Member of the Vermont House of Representatives from the Chittenden-3-4 district
- In office January 2001 – April 1, 2006
- Preceded by: Dean Corren
- Succeeded by: Christopher A. Pearson

Personal details
- Born: April 1, 1947 (age 79) Kenosha, Wisconsin, U.S.
- Party: Progressive
- Spouse: Jackie Majoros
- Children: Matt Wohl
- Education: Knox College

Robert Steven "Bob" Kiss (born April 1, 1947) is an American politician and former mayor of Burlington, Vermont. Kiss was a member of the Vermont House of Representatives from January 2001 until he stepped down to assume office as mayor of Burlington, following his election to that office in March 2006. He is a member of the Vermont Progressive Party. Kiss won re-election in 2009, and was endorsed by Vermont's Independent U.S. Senator Bernie Sanders. In November 2011, Kiss announced that he would not seek re-election in the 2012 Burlington mayoral election.

== Biography ==
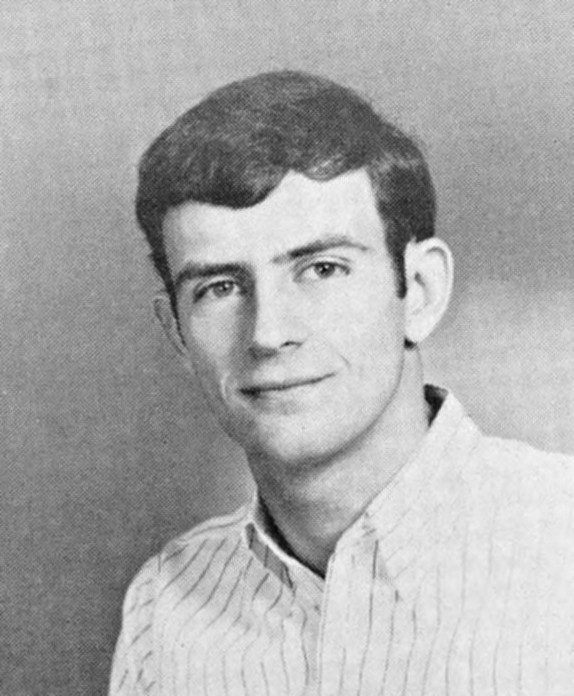
Kiss in the Knox College yearbook, 1969

Kiss has blue-collar roots, having grown up as the son of a union worker in Kenosha, Wisconsin. He was a high school basketball player and captain of the tennis team. After having graduated with a B.A. in political science from Knox College in 1969, he joined the Peace Corps, where he trained in Malaysia for 14 weeks. Although called up by a draft board for military service, he was granted conscientious objector status and performed alternative service at a hospital in Boston.

Since 1971, when he moved to Burlington, he has been working in the human services field. In 1981, Kiss was hired as director of the Community Action program for Chittenden County, a low-income advocacy group. Six years later, he became head of Community Action's umbrella organization, the Champlain Valley Office of Economic Opportunity. Kiss remained head of the CVOEO until 1999. He also served on the boards of the Burlington Housing Authority and the committee on temporary shelter during this time.

== Political career ==
=== Legislative record ===
Kiss was elected to a seat in the Vermont House of Representatives in 2000 as the standard-bearer of the Progressive Party. He quickly earned the respect of his colleagues and was subsequently anointed leader of the Progressive Party Caucus. He sponsored legislation on whistle blower protection for health care workers, rental housing health and safety, and outdoor lighting.

Kiss represented the Chittenden 3-4 House district. He stepped down from the legislature on April 1, 2006, after being elected mayor of Burlington. Governor James Douglas appointed Christopher Pearson, also a Progressive, to serve the remainder of Kiss's term.

=== Mayor of Burlington ===
Kiss was elected mayor of Burlington on March 7, 2006. In the election, he prevailed over opponents Hinda Miller, Democrat, and Kevin Curley, Republican. With his election, Kiss became the second Vermont Progressive to be elected to the office (Peter Clavelle was the first). Bernie Sanders, who is associated with the party but not a member, had been elected to this office prior to Clavelle. Kiss won re-election in 2009 to a second term as Burlington mayor by edging out Republican City Council President Kurt Wright in the third round of instant-runoff voting after receiving 29% of the first round votes.

During his re-election campaign Kiss was endorsed by Vermont's Independent U.S. Senator Bernie Sanders. After re-election Mayor Kiss and the City of Burlington faced significant challenges related to Burlington Telecom, a city-owned and operated fiber-to-the-home telecommunications company. Burlington Telecom is currently in proceedings at the Vermont Public Service Board for being out of compliance with its Certificate of Public Good because of its use of the City's pooled cash account. Also related to the use of pooled cash, the City defended a taxpayer lawsuit in Chittenden County Superior Court, which was dismissed in October 2012. In addition, Burlington was sued in federal court by Citibank, related to the lease-purchase agreement for Burlington Telecom. The city owes Citibank over $33 million. Over this period, the City of Burlington's credit rating has been downgraded by Moody's, reflecting the financial challenges posed by Burlington Telecom. Throughout this time, the telecom entity has continued to provide its fiber-to-the-home services to Burlington residents and businesses.

=== Vermont Senate candidacy ===
Kiss announced in May 2012 he would run as an independent for the Vermont Senate. Kiss finished eighth of 14 candidates running for six seats.

== Affiliations ==
As mayor, Kiss was a member of the Mayors Against Illegal Guns Coalition, a bi-partisan group with a stated goal of "making the public safer by getting illegal guns off the streets." The Coalition was co-chaired by Boston Mayor Thomas Menino and New York City Mayor Michael Bloomberg.

== Personal ==
Bob lives in a Burlington duplex with his companion of more than 30 years, Jackie Majoros.

== Electoral history ==
Bob Kiss electoral history

=== Vermont General Assembly ===
2000 Vermont House of Representatives Chittenden 7-3 district election
Party	Candidate	Votes	%
Progressive	David Zuckerman (incumbent)	2,090	52.86%
Progressive	Bob Kiss	1,730	43.75%
Write-in		134	4.54%
Total votes		3,954	100.00%

2002 Vermont House of Representatives Chittenden 3-4 district election
Primary election
Party	Candidate	Votes	%
Progressive	David Zuckerman (incumbent)	59	50.86%
Progressive	Bob Kiss (incumbent)	53	45.69%
Write-in		4	3.45%
Total votes		116	100.00%
	Blank/Spoiled	9	
General election
Progressive	David Zuckerman (incumbent)	1,200	31.91%
Progressive	Bob Kiss (incumbent)	1,022	27.17%
Democratic	Anthony Gierzynski	790	21.01%
Democratic	Nancy Kirby	736	19.57%
Write-in		13	0.35%
Total votes		3,761	100.00%

2004 Vermont House of Representatives Chittenden 3-4 district election
Party	Candidate	Votes	%
Progressive	David Zuckerman (incumbent)	2,424	52.88%
Progressive	Bob Kiss (incumbent)	2,095	45.70%
Write-in		65	1.42%
Total votes		4,584	100.00%

2012 Vermont Senate Chittenden district election
Party	Candidate	Votes	%
Democratic	Tim Ashe (incumbent)		
Progressive	Tim Ashe (incumbent)		
Total	Tim Ashe (incumbent)	37,357	13.26%
Democratic	Virginia Lyons (incumbent)	34,957	12.41%
Democratic	Sally Fox (incumbent)	34,909	12.39%
Progressive	David Zuckerman	32,253	11.45%
Republican	Dianne Snelling (incumbent)	31,523	11.19%
Democratic	Philip Baruth (incumbent)	30,942	10.98%
Democratic	Debbie Ingram	23,441	8.32%
Independent	Bob Kiss	12,324	4.37%
Independent	Patrick N. Brown	12,217	4.34%
Tea Party	Shelley Palmer	8,362	2.97%
Independent	Robert Letovsky	8,321	2.95%
Independent	Sean Selby	6,157	2.19%
Green	Larkin Forney	5,618	1.99%
Progressive	Richard Jeroloman	3,322	1.18%
Total votes		281,703	100.00%

=== Burlington, Vermont Mayor ===
2006 Burlington, Vermont mayoral election
Primary election
Party	Candidate	Votes	%
Progressive	Bob Kiss	70	100.00%
Total votes		70	100.00%
General election
Progressive	Bob Kiss	4,761	54.43%
Democratic	Hinda Miller	3,986	45.57%
Total votes		8,747	100.00%

2009 Burlington, Vermont mayoral election
Candidate	Round 1			Round 2			Round 3	
Candidate	Votes	%	Transfer	Votes	%	Transfer	Votes	%
Bob Kiss	2,585	28.80%	+396	2,981	33.76%	+1,332	4,313	51.50%
Kurt Wright	2,951	32.88%	+343	3,294	37.31%	+767	4,061	48.50%
Andy Montroll	2,063	22.98%	+491	2,554	28.93%	-2,554	Eliminated	
Dan Smith	1,306	14.55%	-1,306	Eliminated				
Write-ins	36	0.40%	-36	Eliminated				
James Simpson	35	0.39%	-35	Eliminated				
Total active ballots	8,976 ballots			8,829 ballots			8,374 ballots	
Exhausted ballots	4 ballots			+147	151 ballots		+455	606 ballots

== See also ==
- List of elected socialist mayors in the United States

Political offices
Preceded by Peter Clavelle	Mayor of Burlington, Vermont; 2006–2012	Succeeded by Miro Weinberger
