= Miro Weinberger =

American politician (born 1970)

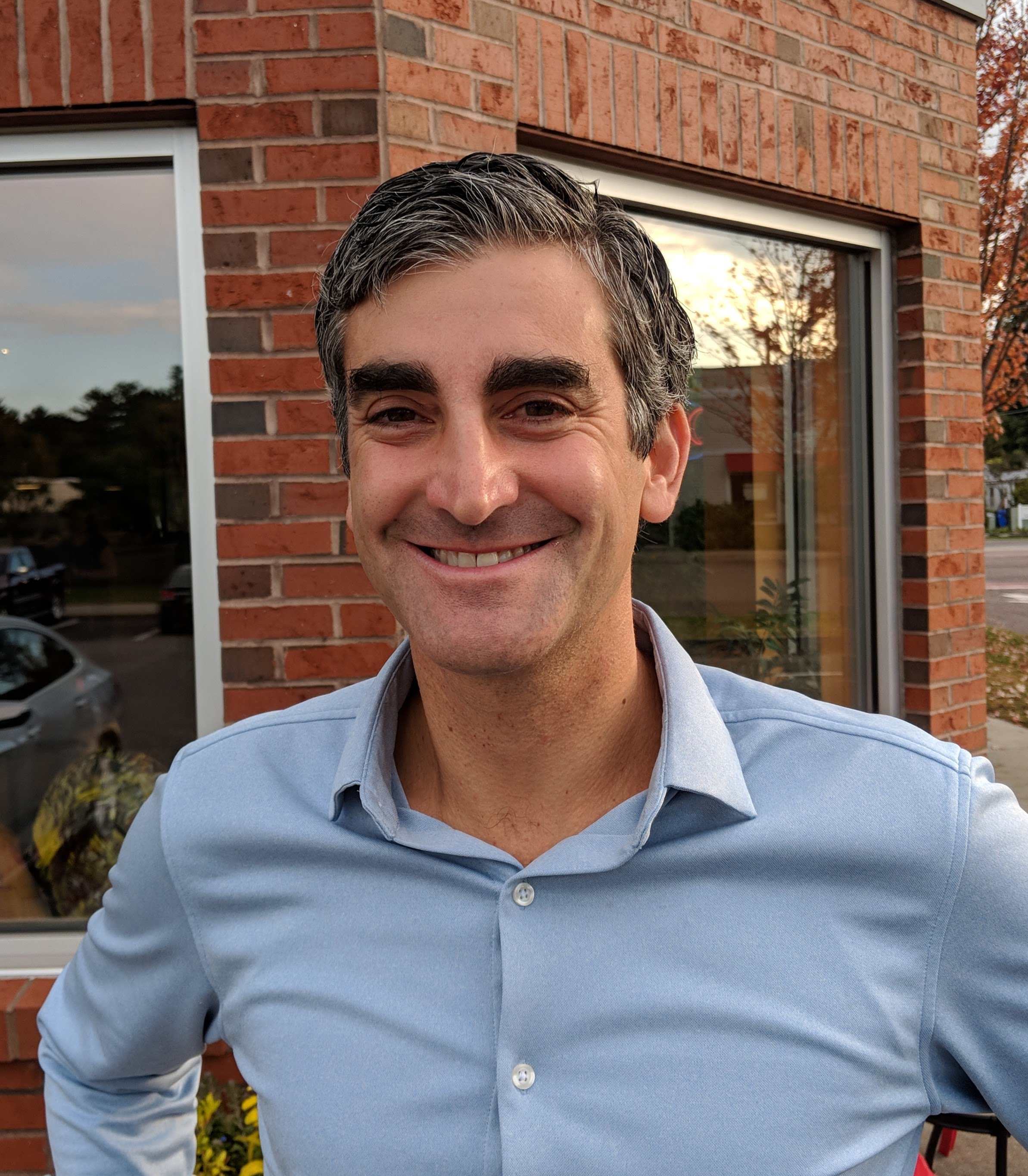

42nd Mayor of Burlington
- In office April 2, 2012 – April 1, 2024
- Preceded by: Bob Kiss
- Succeeded by: Emma Mulvaney-Stanak

Personal details
- Born: February 25, 1970 (age 56) Brattleboro, Vermont, U.S.
- Party: Democratic
- Spouse: Stacy Sherwat (m. 2000)
- Children: 2
- Education: Yale University (BA); Harvard University (MPP)

Miro Weinberger (born February 25, 1970) is an American politician who was the 42nd mayor of Burlington, Vermont. He was the city's first Democratic Party mayor since Gordon Paquette was defeated by Bernie Sanders in 1981. Weinberger was the Democratic Party chair for Chittenden County during the 2004 election cycle. He also was on the Burlington Airport Commission for nine years, as board president of the Turning Point Center of Chittenden County, a drug addiction recovery organization, and on the board of the ECHO Lake Aquarium and Science Center, Leahy Center for Lake Champlain.

== Early life ==
Weinberger was born in Brattleboro, Vermont, and raised in Hartland, in a Jewish family. After graduating from Woodstock Union High School, he attended Yale University, where he graduated with a double major in environmental studies and American studies. Weinberger then worked in Washington, D.C., for Senator Patrick Leahy and on Senator Harris Wofford's reelection campaign. He also worked for Habitat for Humanity in Georgia, Florida, and New York, and completed a master's degree in public policy and urban planning at the Kennedy School of Government.

== Professional career ==
In 2002, Weinberger returned to Vermont and co-founded the Hartland Group in Burlington. In less than nine years, his company built over 200 affordable and market rate homes in Vermont and New Hampshire, consisting of over $40 million of development. His work has won a smart growth and a green building award, LEED certifications, and has involved the clean-up of environmentally contaminated sites.

Weinberger's previous professional work included three and a half years with the Greyston Foundation, a community development organization in southwest Yonkers, and a short stint as a sports writing intern for the Boston Globe.

=== Mayor of Burlington ===
Weinberger was elected mayor of Burlington on March 6, 2012. He defeated Tim Ashe by one vote in the Democrat primary. He beat Republican Party nominee Kurt Wright in the general election. Weinberger won with 57.7% of the vote. He was reelected on March 3, 2015, Town Meeting Day, with 68% of the vote over former Burlington Public Works Director Steve Goodkind. On March 6, 2018, Weinberger defeated Carina Driscoll (Bernie Sanders's stepdaughter) and Infinite Culcleasure to win a third term in office with 48% of the vote. Weinberger won reelection in 2021 by less than 1 point against Progressive Party nominee Max Tracy. On September 28, 2023, Weinberger announced that he would not seek a fifth term as mayor.

In office, Weinberger has focused on mitigating Burlington's contributions to climate change, improving early learning opportunities for youth, stewarding the city's financial health, leading initiatives to regulate Burlington's housing market, and combating the opioid epidemic.

Burlington became the nation's first city to source all its energy from renewable generation during Weinberger's tenure as mayor in 2014. Weinberger and his administration have set a goal of becoming a net zero energy city in the next 15 years. In coordination with the City's Electric Department, he has overseen an expansion in solar installations throughout Burlington – from 25 solar arrays pre-2012 to about 160 in 2017 – and in electric vehicle charging stations and electric vehicle purchasing incentives.

In mid-2021, Weinberger ordered the closure of the Sears Lane homeless encampment, displacing at least two residents, who filed an unsuccessful legal challenge to the decision.

As mayor, Weinberger spearheaded an initiative to redevelop Burlington's sole closed-interior mall into a mixed-use project. The original mall was demolished in 2017, but redevelopment stalled for years due to funding issues and myriad lawsuits. Construction resumed in 2022.

== Personal life ==
Weinberger married Stacy Sherwat in 2000, and they have two daughters. Stacy is the Early Education Director at the King Street Center. Weinberger plays catcher for the Burlington Cardinals in an over-35 men's baseball league; former Boston Red Sox pitcher Bill Lee is also on the team.

Political offices
Preceded by Bob Kiss	Mayor of Burlington; 2012–2024	Succeeded by Emma Mulvaney-Stanak
