= Timeline of Burlington, Vermont =

Coordinates: 44.476°N 73.212°W

The following is a timeline of the history of the city of Burlington, Vermont, USA

== Prior to 19th century ==
- 1763 - Town charter granted by the British Province of New Hampshire.
- 1774 - Settlement established.
- 1791
  - March 4: Town becomes part of the State of Vermont.
  - November 3: University of Vermont founded.
  - Burlington becomes shire town of Chittenden County.
- 1797 - Burlington Mercury newspaper begins publication.

== 19th century ==
- 1801 - Vermont Sentinel newspaper begins publication.
- 1802 - Court house built.

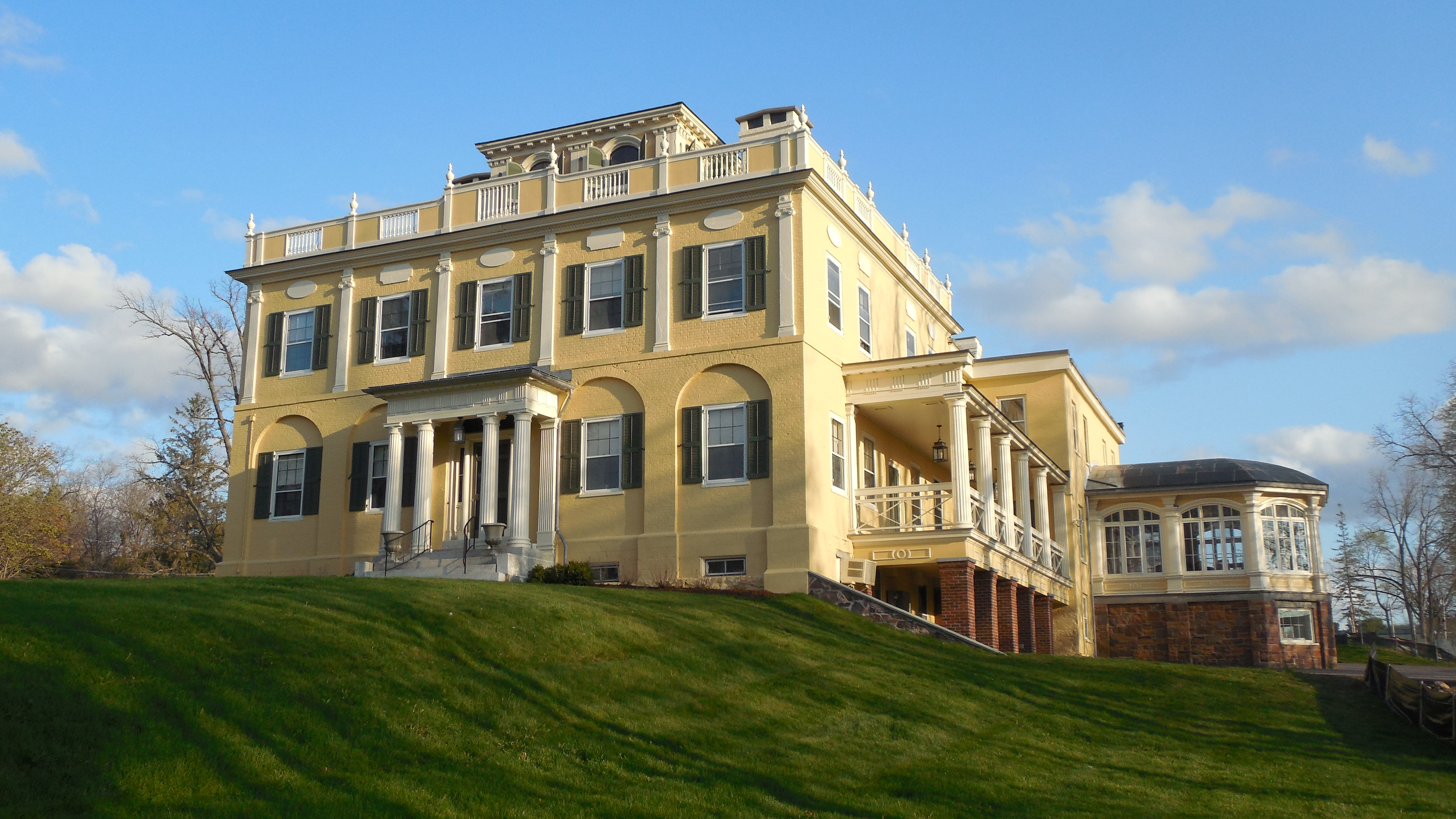
Grasse Mount (otherwise known as the Thaddeus Tuttle House) is a campus building of the University of Vermont (UVM)

- 1804 - Grasse Mount built, now a campus building of the University of Vermont
- 1810 - Population: 1,690.
- 1813 - August 2: Town besieged by British forces.
- 1815 - September: University of Vermont begins operating again.

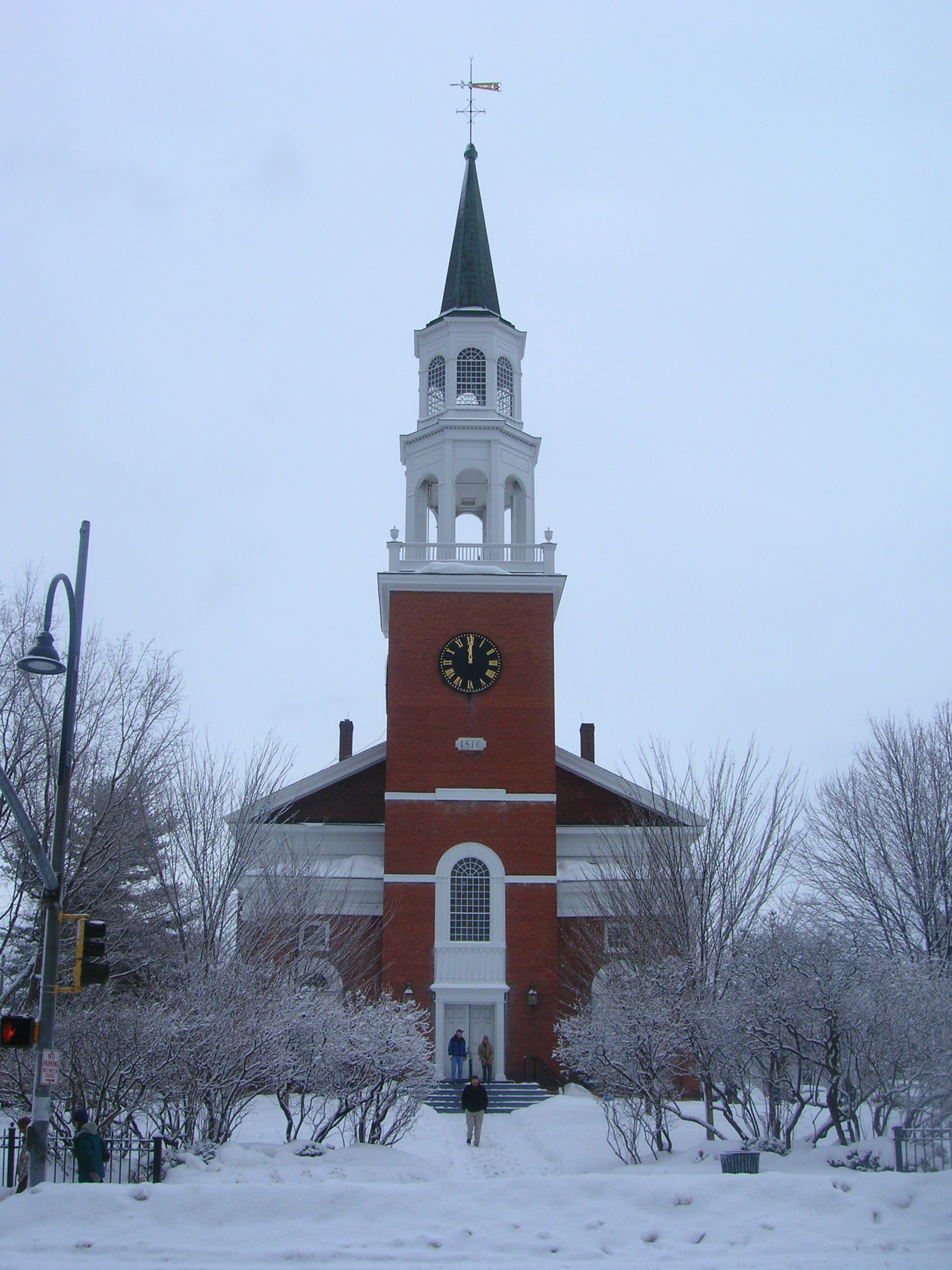
Unitarian Church at the top of Church St., intersecting Pearl St. in Burlington, Vermont.

- 1816 - Unitarian Church built.
- 1823 - Methodist Episcopal Church established.
- 1825 - LaFayette visits town.
- 1826 - Champlain Transportation Company founded.
- 1827
  - Free Press Weekly begins publication.
  - Champlain Glass Company established.
- 1829
  - Lyman block built.
  - Burlington High School and Burlington Fire Company incorporated.
- 1830 - Episcopal Society of Burlington founded.
- 1834 - Baptist church established.
- 1842 - Burlington Mechanics' Institute founded.
- 1845 - Winooski Mill Company established.
- 1847
  - E. & E. Lyman in business.
  - Commercial Bank of Burlington and Burlington Savings Bank chartered.
- 1848 - Central Vermont Railway began operating (until 1995).
- 1849
  - Rutland & Burlington Railroad built.
- 1852 - Burlington Lyceum founded.
- 1853 - Medical College established as part of the University of Vermont.
- 1854
  - Town Hall built.
  - Vermont Episcopal Institute incorporated.
- 1856 - Van Sicklen & Walker grocers in business.
- 1857
  - Custom House built.
  - Burlington Breakwater Lights established.

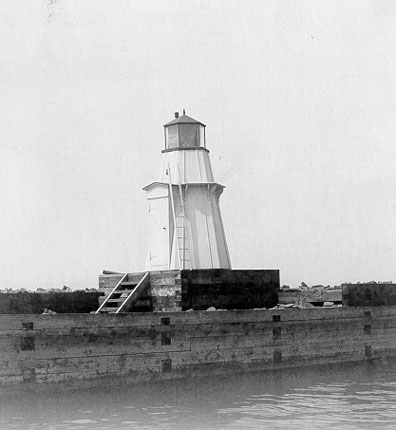
Burlington Breakwater North Lighthouse

- 1858
  - Marine Hospital built.
  - Burlington Times newspaper begins publication.
- 1862 - University of Vermont library building constructed.
- 1865
  - Burlington chartered as a city; town of South Burlington established.
  - Albert Catlin becomes mayor.
  - Vermont Agricultural College incorporated with the University of Vermont.
  - Home for Destitute Children founded.
- 1866 - St. Joseph's Orphan Asylum incorporated.
- 1867
  - J.M. Henry & Sons in business.
  - Cathedral of the Immaculate Conception built.
- 1869 - First Methodist Church of Burlington built.
- 1870
  - City market building constructed.
  - E.S. Fullam & Co. in business.
  - Population: 14,387.
- 1872
  - Winooski & Burlington Horse Railroad incorporated.
  - Wells, Richardson & Co. in business.
- 1873
  - Fletcher Free Library established.
  - County courthouse built.
- 1874 - Park House (hotel) in business.
- 1877 - Howard Opera House built (approximate date).
- 1878 - Burlington Commercial School established.
- 1879 - Mary Fletcher Hospital founded.
- 1880 - Population: 11,365.
- 1884 - Burlington Venetian Blind Company incorporated.
- 1885
  - Old Ohavi Zedek Synagogue built.
  - Urban A. Woodbury becomes mayor.
- 1886 - Daniel Webster Robinson House built.
- 1887 - Cathedral of Saint Joseph completed.
- 1888 - Burlington Cotton Mills incorporated.
- 1889
  - St. Mary's academy founded.
  - Baldwin Refrigerator Company established (approximate date).
- 1890 - Population: 14,590.
- 1894
  - Queen City Cotton Co. incorporated.
  - William J. Van Patten becomes mayor.
  - Burlington Daily News begins publication.
  - Fort Ethan Allen established.
- 1897
  - Burlington Masonic Temple built.

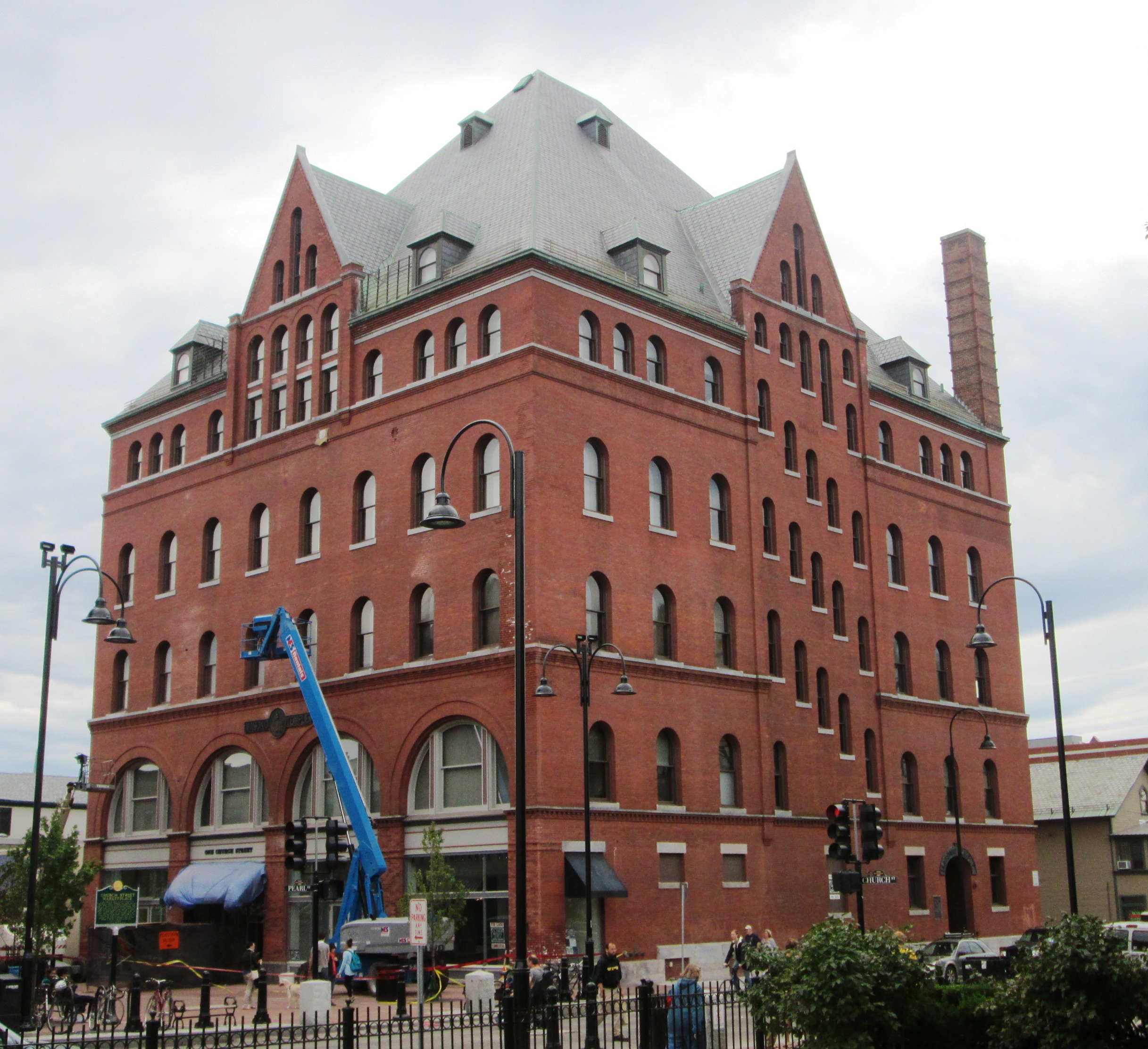
The Masonic Temple in Burlington Vermont, built in 1898.

  - Battery Park established.
- 1900 - Population: 18,640.

A Monument to American Civil War veteran General William W. Wells by J. Otto Schweizer at Battery_Park in Burlington,_Vermont.

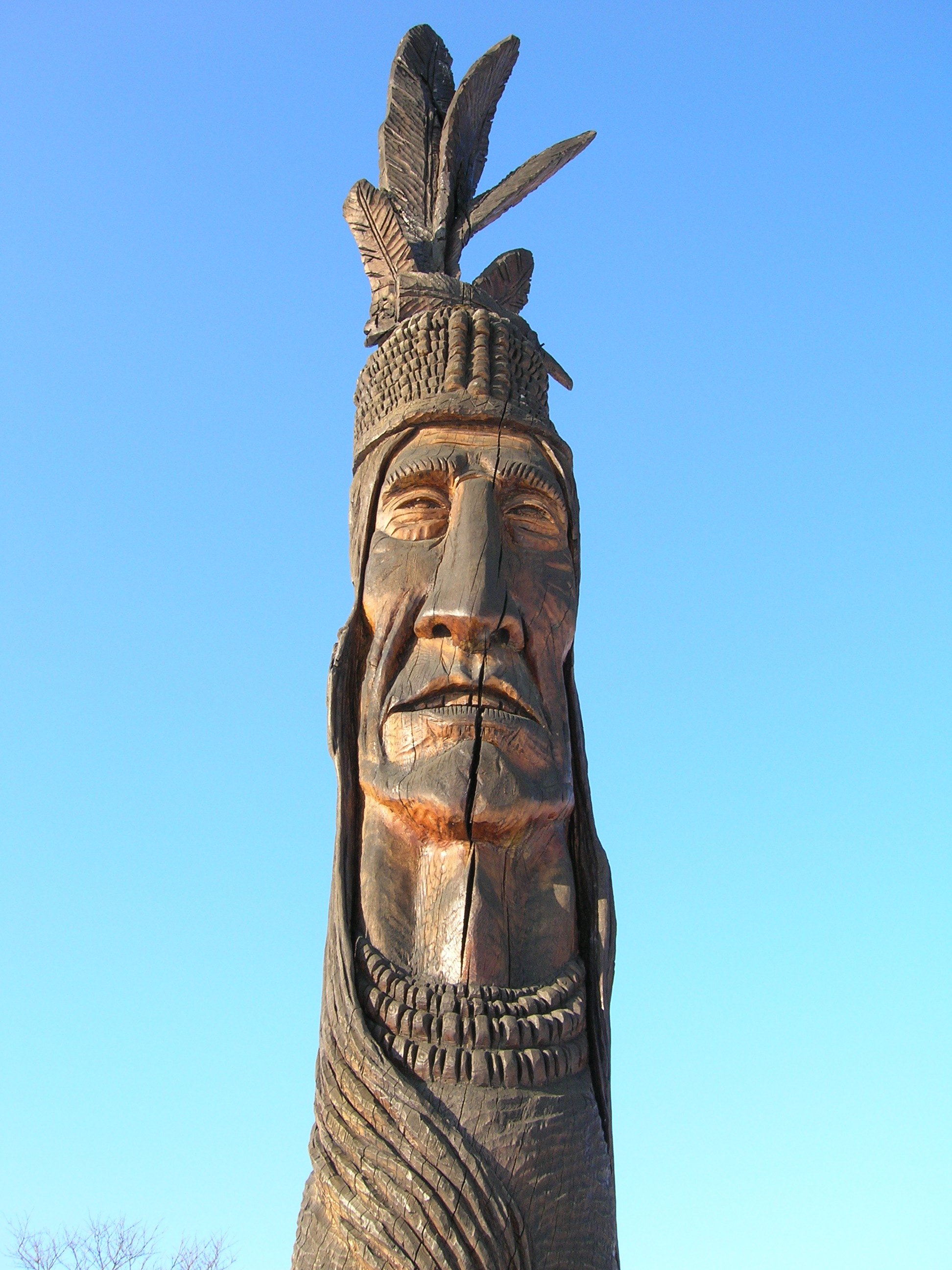
Monument to Gray Lock's War veteran Chief Gray Lock by Peter Wolf Toth at Battery Park (Burlington, Vermont).

== 20th century ==
- 1902 - Fletcher Free Library re-located.
- 1904 - Strong Theatre opens.
- 1905
  - Burlington Electric Department created.
  - McIntosh and Crandall engineering company in business.
- 1910 - Population: 20,468.
- 1916 - Union Station operated until 1953.
- 1920 - First aircraft lands at Burlington International Airport.
- 1922
  - State Tree Nursery relocates from Burlington to Essex.
  - Champlain Valley Fair begins in nearby Essex.
- 1925 - Trinity College founded.
- 1926 - Ira Allen Chapel dedicated.
- 1930 - Flynn Theatre built.
- 1948 - U.S. Coast Guard Station Burlington established on Juniper Island.
- 1953 - Ethan Allen Air Force Base activated.
- 1964 - Burlington High School moves to current location; as part of a major realignment of the city's schools, Edmunds Elementary opens on the former campus replacing Adams (sold off and repurposed as office space) and Converse (demolished in urban renewal) schools.
- 1967
  - City Council expands to 13 aldermen.
  - Population: 35,531.
- 1969 - Howard Center headquartered in city.
- 1972 - Cathedral of the Immaculate Conception destroyed by arson.
- 1973 - Burlington International Airport new terminal opens.
- 1977 - Cathedral of the Immaculate Conception re-built (closed 2018)
- 1978 - Ben & Jerry's in business.

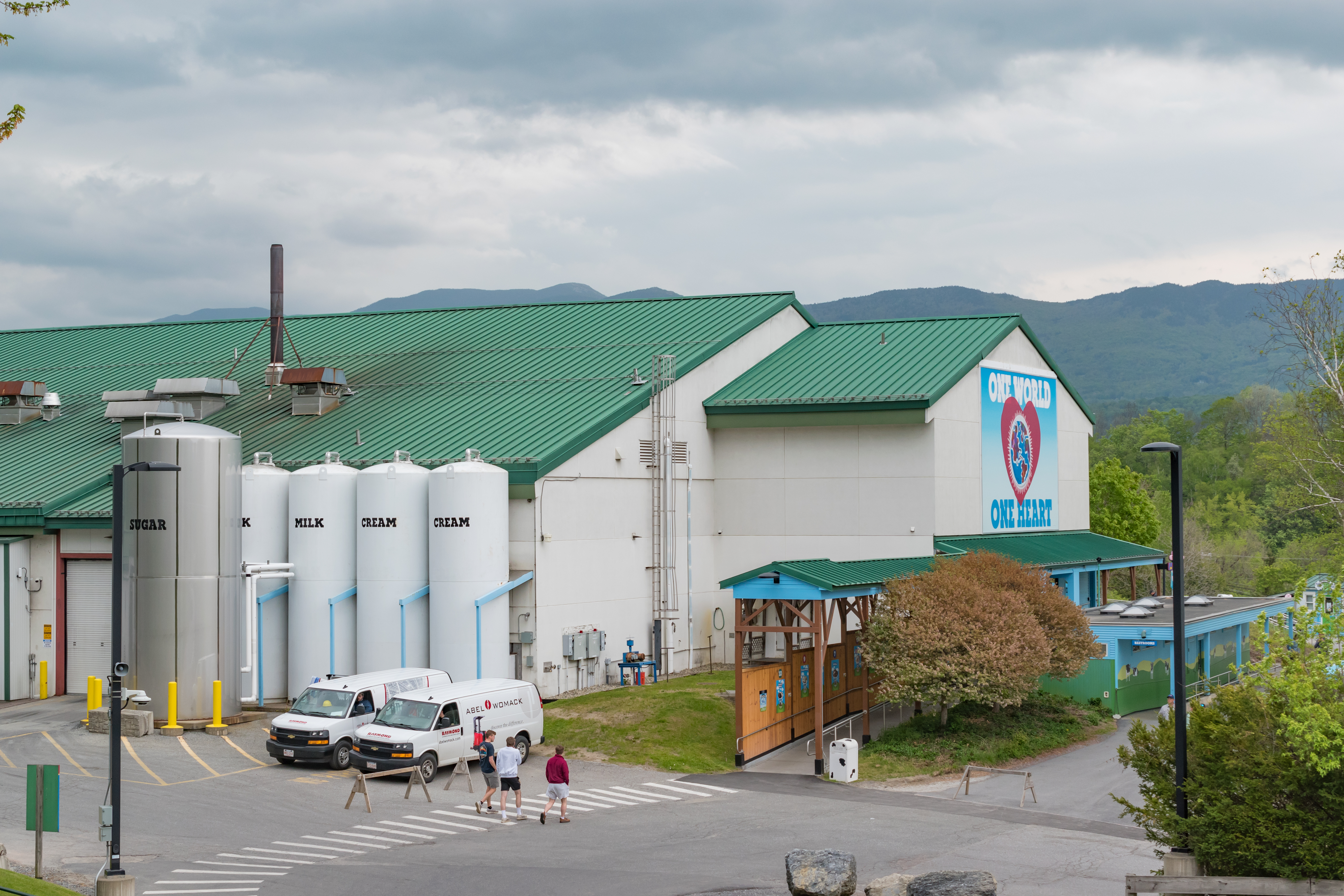
Ben & Jerry's factory

- 1981
  - Church Street Marketplace constructed.
  - Bernie Sanders becomes mayor.
- 1983 - City government Community and Economic Development Office established.
- 1989
  - Outright Vermont founded.
  - Peter Clavelle becomes mayor.
- 1990
  - Burlington City Arts established.
  - Cara Wick designs the flag of Burlington as a school project.
- 1993
  - City Council expands to 14 councilors.
  - Population: 39,127.
- 1998 - City website online.
- 2000 - "Legacy Plan" for development created.

== 21st century ==
- 2003 - Howard Dean presidential campaign, 2004 headquartered in Burlington.
- 2006 - Bob Kiss becomes mayor.
- 2009 - Vermont Daily News begins publication.
- 2010
  - Population: 42,417
  - The city-owned Burlington Telecom cable provider is unable to pay the city of Burlington the $17 million it owes. As a result, Moody's downrates the debt for the city to A2, "upper medium". Moody's also downrates the credit rating for Burlington International Airport.
- 2012 - Miro Weinberger becomes mayor.
- 2014 - with the purchase of the Winooski 1 hydroelectric project on the Winooski River electricity comes from 100 percent renewable sources
- 2015 - Bernie Sanders presidential campaign, 2016 headquartered in Burlington.

Bernie Sanders presidential campaign 2016

- 2017 - Owen and Lucas Marchessault win a competition to redesign the former flag of Burlington. Their winning design is the current flag of the city.

== See also ==
- Burlington history
- Burlington, Vermont metropolitan area
- National Register of Historic Places listings in Chittenden County, Vermont

== Bibliography ==
Published in the 19th century

- Jedidiah Morse; Richard C. Morse (1823), "Burlington", A New Universal Gazetteer (4th ed.), New Haven: S. Converse
- Zadock Thompson (1824), "Burlington", A Gazetteer of the State of Vermont, E. P. Walton, OCLC 5276863
- John Hayward (1857), "Burlington, Vt.", New England Gazetteer (2nd ed.), Boston: Otis Clapp, OCLC 3441657
- Walton, Joseph Soper (1866). "Burlington". Walton's Vermont Register. Claremont Manufacturing Company. hdl:2027/wu.89063116057.
- Abby Maria Hemenway, ed. (1867), "Burlington", Vermont Historical Gazetteer, Burlington, Vt.: A.M. Hemenway
- "Burlington, Vt.", Appleton's Handbook of American Travel: Northern and Eastern Tour, New York: D. Appleton, 1870
- "Burlington (1.)" . Encyclopædia Britannica. Vol. 4 (9th ed.). 1878. p. 550.
- "Burlington". Walton's Vermont Register. Claremont, NH: Claremont Manufacturing Company. 1877. + 1879 ed.
- "City of Burlington". Gazetteer and Business Directory of Chittenden County, Vermont. NY: Hamilton Child. 1882.
- Burlington, Vt. as a Manufacturing, Business, and Commercial Center. Burlington Board of Trade. 1889.
- "Industries and Wealth of Burlington". Industries and Wealth of the Principal Points in Vermont. NY: American Publishing and Engraving Co. 1891.
- Joseph Auld (1894), Picturesque Burlington, Burlington, Vt: Free Press Association, OL 14034397M
- Charter & Revised General Ordinances of the City of Burlington, Vt. 1897.
- Charles S. Forbes (1900). "Twentieth Century Burlington". The Vermonter. 5.

Published in the 20th century

- Katharine Lord (1904). Address book of Burlington, Vermont: 1904-5. Burlington: F. L. Lane & Company.
- Charles Edwin Allen (1905), About Burlington, Vermont, Burlington: Shanley
- "Burlington (Vermont)" . Encyclopædia Britannica. Vol. 4 (11th ed.). 1910. pp. 837–838.
- "Burlington". Walton's Vermont Register. 1910.
- Federal Writers’ Project (1937). "Burlington". Vermont: a Guide to the Green Mountain State. American Guide Series. Cambridge, Massachusetts: Riverside Press. + Chronology
- Tom W. Rice (1985). "Who Votes for a Socialist Mayor?: The Case of Burlington, Vermont". Polity. 17 (4): 795–806. doi:10.2307/3234575. JSTOR 3234575. S2CID 153889856.
- George Thomas Kurian (1994), "Burlington, Vermont", World Encyclopedia of Cities, vol. 1: North America, Santa Barbara, Calif.: ABC-CLIO, OL 1431653M (fulltext via Open Library)

Published in the 21st century

- James Fallows and Deborah Fallows, ed. (April 5, 2017), "City Makers: American Futures", The Atlantic (series of articles about Burlington, Vt.), 2014-
- Colin Woodard (November 17, 2016), "America's First All-Renewable-Energy City", Politico
