= List of tallest buildings in Vermont =

Below is a list of the tallest buildings in the U.S. state of Vermont ranked by height in feet. All buildings over 100 feet in height are included. Grace Church, in Rutland, is the tallest building in Vermont at 199 feet.

== Tallest buildings ==
Rank	Name	Picture	Height	Floors	City	Year	Notes
1	Grace Church		199 feet	1	Rutland	1860	Church
2=	Ira Allen Chapel (UVM)		170 feet	1	Burlington	1925	Church
2=	Unitarian Church	Unitarian Church at the top of Church St., intersecting Pearl St. in Burlington, Vermont, 2008.	170 feet	1	Burlington	1816	Church
4	Stowe Community Church		165 feet	1	Stowe	1863	Church
5=	Montpelier City Hall		150 feet	4	Montpelier	1909	
5=	Old Mill (UVM)		150 feet	4	Burlington	1825	
7	First Methodist Church	First United Methodist Church Burlington Vermont	147 feet	1	Burlington	1869	Church
8	Burlington Square South Tower	Burlington Square South Tower	139 feet	11	Burlington	2025	
9	Vermont State House		136 feet	2	Montpelier	1859	
10	Congregational Church		135 feet	1	Middlebury	1809	Church
11	Masonic Temple		130 feet	5	Burlington	1898	
12	Sheldon Towers	RutlandVista (cropped), Sheldon Towers	124 feet	10	Rutland	1972	
13	Decker Towers		116.3 feet	11	Burlington	1971	
14	100 Bank Street	100 Bank Street, Burlington, Vermont	116 feet	8	Burlington		Roof mechanics included in height
15	The Nest	The Nest Burlington 2025 (cropped)	111.7 feet	9	Burlington	2022	
16	First Baptist Church	First Baptist Church Burlington VT	110 feet	1	Burlington	1864	Church
17	The Westlake Residences		107.5 feet	9	Burlington	2007	Roof mechanics included in height
18=	St. Mary Star of the Sea		105 feet	1	Newport	1904	Church
18=	Corporate Plaza (Key Bank)		105 feet	8	Burlington	1988	
20	Three Cathedral Square		103.3 feet	10	Burlington	1979	Roof mechanics included in height
21	Service Building	The Service Building in Rutland, VT	101 feet	7	Rutland	1930	

== Under construction or approved ==
Building	Town/City	Height	Floors	Status
Burlington Square North Tower	Burlington	136+ feet	12	Under construction, expected to be completed in 2027

== Other tall structures ==
Name	Photography	Height	Town/City	Built	Type	Notes
Kingdom Community Wind project		450 feet	Lowell	2012	wind turbines	21 turbines in total.
WCAT Radio Tower		445 feet	Burlington	1981	radio mast	Part of a larger array; other towers are 358 and 266 feet tall. Tallest radio tower in Vermont.
WVMT Radio Towers		411 feet	Burlington	1922	radio mast	All 3 towers are 411 feet (125 meters) tall
East Charlotte Telecommunications Tower		408 feet	Charlotte	1993	radio mast	Broadcast station is unknown.
Bennington Battle Monument		306 feet	Bennington	1889	obelisk	Tallest occupiable structure in Vermont.
WIZN Tower		199 feet	Charlotte	1986	radio mast	
Petrofina Alburg #1		160 feet	Alburg	1964	oil derrick	Remnants of a short oil boom in the mid-20th century. Abandoned in 1965.
North Springfield Gatehouse		160 feet	North Springfield	1960	gatehouse	
Bethel Tower		120 feet	Bethel	2013	cell phone tower	
Moran Municipal Generation Station		90 feet	Burlington	1955	power plant	Decommissioned in 1986.
Vermont Yankee Tower			Vernon	1972	power plant	Decommissioned in 2014.
Farmhouse Inn		68 feet	Woodstock	1915	barnhouse	Claims to be the tallest barn in Vermont.
Hubbard Park Tower		58 feet	Montpelier	1930	Observation tower	Construction of the tower intermittently took place from 1915 to 1930.
Joseph Smith Birthplace Memorial		50 feet	South Royalton	1905	obelisk	One of "the largest polished shafts in the world".
File Under So. Co., Waiting for...*		40 feet	Burlington	2002	filing cabinet/art installation*	commonly referred to as "World's Tallest Filing Cabinet"
Burlington Breakwater North Light		35 feet	Burlington	2003	lighthouse	Tallest lighthouse in Vermont.
