= Richard Sugarman =

American academic (born 1944)

- Born: July 12, 1944 (age 82); Buffalo, New York, U.S.
- Education: Yale University; Boston University
- Occupations: Academic, political advisor
- Spouse: Linda Sugarman
- Children: 3

Richard Sugarman (born July 12, 1944) is an American academic and political consultant. He is a professor of religion at the University of Vermont and "a world-renowned expert on the French philosopher Emmanuel Levinas". He was an advisor to presidential candidate Bernie Sanders on his 2016 presidential campaign.

== Early life ==
Richard Sugarman was born in Buffalo, New York. He grew up in a largely Orthodox neighborhood where "one in every four residents was a 'DP,' or displaced person, tattooed with a number from a Nazi death camp." Sugarman is of Ukrainian Jewish descent on his paternal side and of English Jewish descent on his maternal side. His father's family were Hasidic Jews; his mother was a Reform Jew. His father was a serial entrepreneur.

Sugarman received his B.A. cum laude in philosophy from Yale University in 1966; his roommate was Joe Lieberman, who later served as United States Senator. One of his professors was John Daniel Wild, and he also was mentored by Paul Weiss. After serving as a Carnegie Teaching Fellow in philosophy at Yale during the 1966–1967 academic year, he went on to receive an M.A. from Yale in 1969 and a Ph.D. from Boston University in 1976, both in philosophy. His thesis was entitled, Toward a Phenomenology of Ressentiment.

== Academic career ==
Following his Carnegie Fellowship, Sugarman resumed teaching as a part-time instructor of philosophy and religion at the University of Vermont in 1970. He became a full-time instructor of philosophy and religion in 1971 before moving to the newly formed religion department in 1974. In addition to receiving tenure in 1978, he was subsequently promoted to assistant professor (1976), associate professor (1986) and professor (2002) of religion. The author of several books, he specializes in the interstices between phenomenology, Jewish philosophy, existentialism, and ancient and modern humanities. He is also "a world-renowned expert on the Lithuanian-born philosopher Emmanuel Levinas."

According to Anna-Teresa Tymieniecka, "one of his journal articles in Phenomenological Inquiry was on Pope John Paul II's nightstand the day he died."

== Political consultancy career ==
Sugarman encouraged Bernie Sanders to run for mayor of Burlington in 1981 after the two had lived together. He was an advisor to the 2016 Bernie Sanders presidential campaign.

== Personal life ==
Sugarman has a wife, Linda, and three children. They reside in Burlington, Vermont. At 68, Sugarman has arthritis. He is an Orthodox Jew and attended Congregation Ahavath Gerim. He is also an "unapologetic Zionist."

== Works ==
- Sugarman, Richard (1980). Rancor Against Time: The Phenomenology of 'Ressentiment'. Hamburg: F. Meiner. ISBN 9783787304561. OCLC 6598022.
- Sugarman, Richard; Simone, R. Thomas (1986). Reclaiming the Humanities: The Roots of Self-Knowledge in the Greek and Biblical Worlds. Lanham, Maryland: University Press of America. ISBN 9780819150936. OCLC 12695582.
- Sugarman, Richard; Duncan, Roger B. (2006). The Promise of Phenomenology: Posthumous Papers of John Wild. Lanham, Maryland: Lexington Books. ISBN 9780739109427. OCLC 61651779.
