= Decker Towers =

Building in Burlington, Vermont, United States

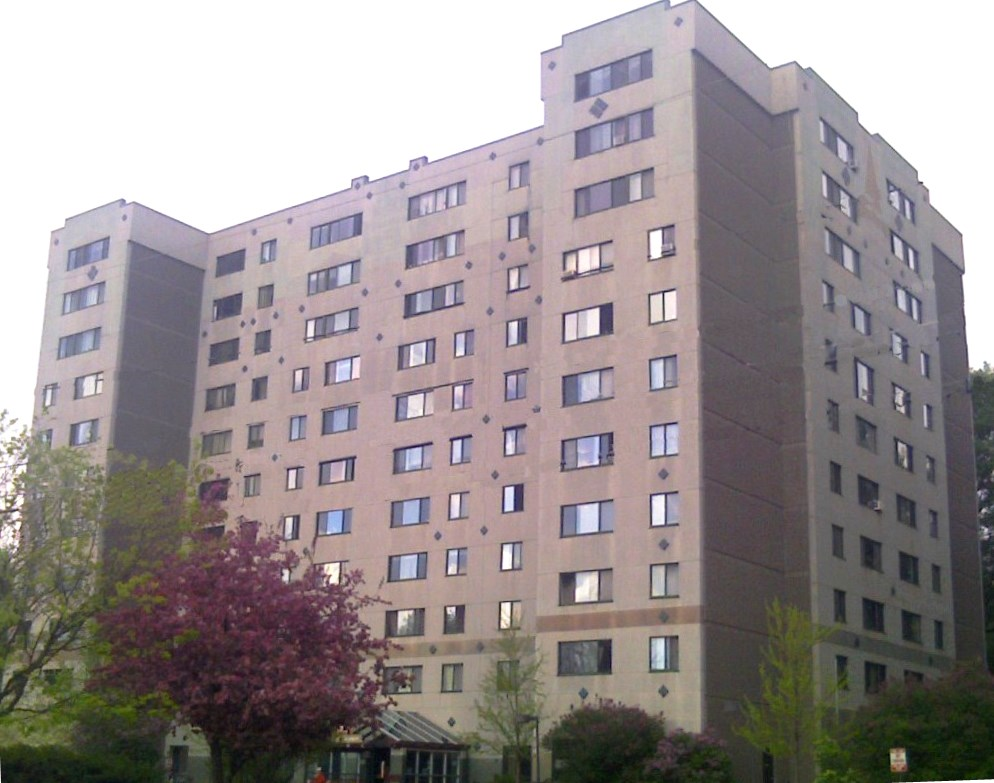
- Decker Towers from St. Paul Street
- Interactive map of the Decker Towers area
- Alternative names: 230 St. Paul Street

General information
- Status: Completed
- Type: public housing, offices
- Location: 230 St. Paul Street, Burlington, Vermont
- Coordinates: 44.4727°N 73.213207°W
- Construction started: October 29, 1970
- Completed: 1971
- Opening: August 31, 1971
- Owner: Burlington Housing Authority
- Operator: Burlington Housing Authority

Height
- Antenna spire: 124 ft (38 m), 116.3 ft (35 m) to mechanicals
- Roof: 101.3 ft (31 m)
- Top floor: 11

Technical details
- Floor count: 11
- Floor area: 120,080 sq ft (11,200 m^{2})

Design and construction
- Developer: Pizzagalli Construction Company

Decker Towers is an 11-floor apartment building at 230 St. Paul Street in Burlington, Vermont. Decker Towers was built as a turnkey project that was purchased by the City of Burlington. Pizzagalli Construction Company began construction on October 29, 1970, and the towers opened on August 31, 1971. It is owned and managed as public housing by the Burlington Housing Authority. Its assessed value is $11,104,000, with the building, land, and yard items valued at $10,224,700; $712,900; and $166,400, respectively.

The building is often falsely believed to be the tallest building in Vermont, caused by a faulty ranking on Wikipedia. However, it is tied for the most floors of any building in the state, tied with the Burlington Square buildings, and North Barre Manor in Barre.

== Features ==
Decker Towers has a small community garden. Decker Towers has 161 apartments for seniors and people with disabilities. The apartments are either one bedroom or efficiency apartments; six apartments are wheelchair accessible. There is also a dining area, a library, and an 11th floor sitting area. The tenant organization hosts monthly dinners, holiday events and bingo.

The Burlington Housing Authority's Neighborhood Networks Technology Center is located within Decker Towers. It has computers for use by all residents of subsidized housing in the Burlington area.

== History ==
When it opened on August 31, 1971, Decker Towers was called 230 St. Paul Street (its official address then and now). It was the fourth property owned by the Burlington Housing Authority. It was built on top of the old Burlington ravine sewer route.

In late 1971, the administrative offices of the Burlington Housing Authority were moved to the first floor of 230 St. Paul Street. The offices were there until July 2002. The building was dedicated as Decker Towers on May 9, 2003.

== Renovations ==
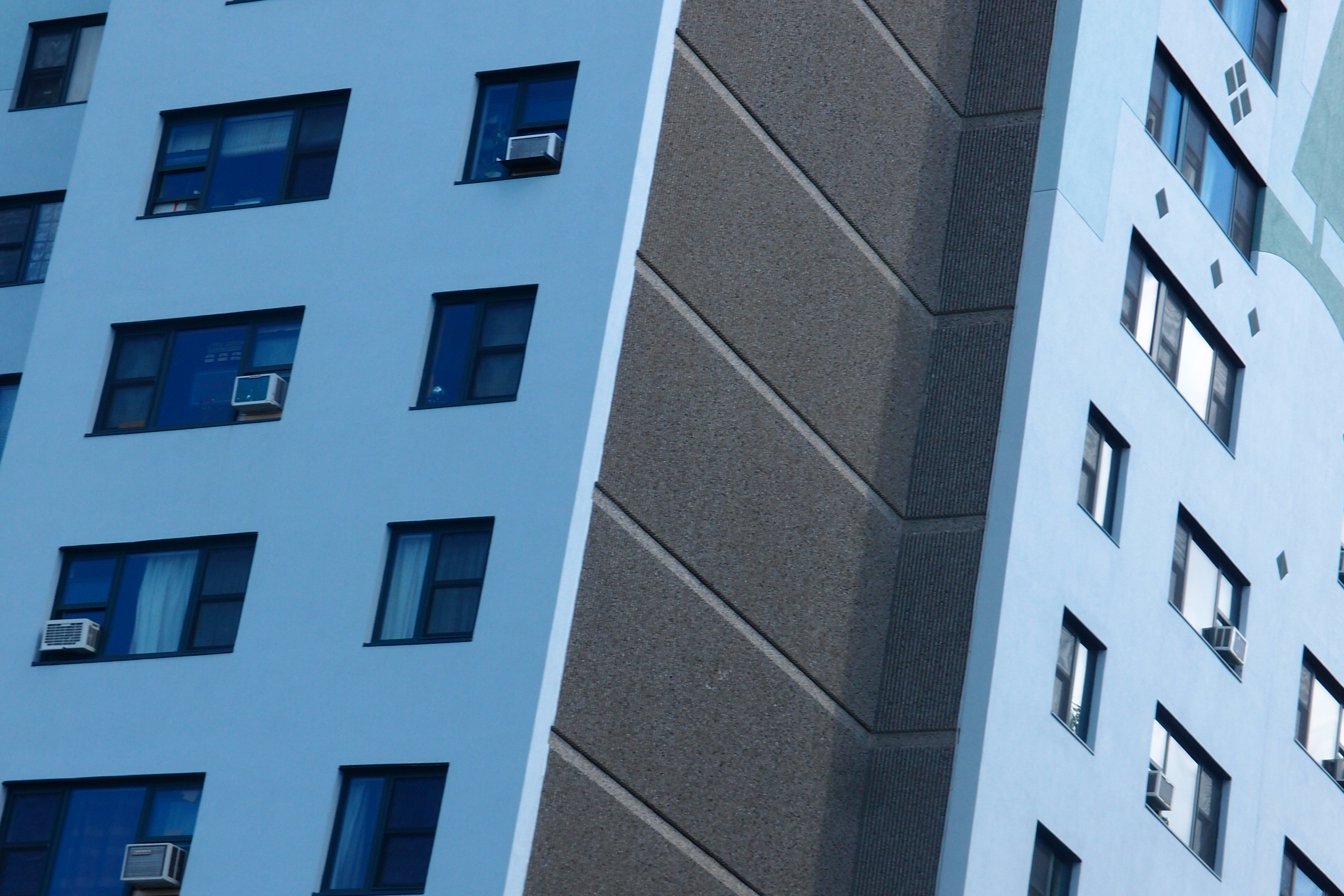
Detail of Decker Towers Renovation

Decker Towers was built with an orange brick exterior. In 1984, exterior insulation was added over the brick as well as pastel swatches designed by Rolf Kielman.

Prior to 2010, the building's exterior had degraded: there were cracks, moisture in the insulation, and window seals were no longer fully functional.

In 2009, money from the American Recovery and Reinvestment Act of 2009 was used at Decker Towers to replace hallway floors as well as resurface the parking lot. Additional funding for renovations also came from Capital Fund Grants.

Other renovations included weatherproofing, a thorough power-wash, reinforcement of stucco, application of a waterproof membrane, a fiberglass mesh layer, and new caulk. The dust barriers were also replaced.

More than 550 windows were removed and replaced with energy-efficient windows, and 33,000 ft^{2} (3,066 m^{2}) of exterior insulation finishing system was improved by increasing the thickness of the insulation and re-painting the building.

Decker Towers was fully occupied and functioning during the renovations. The project was finished ahead of schedule.

== Smoking policy ==
Decker Towers caught on fire on February 17, 2010, due to careless smoking. Water from the building's fire sprinkler system caused $100,000 in damage.

Decker Towers are smoke-free as of November 1, 2010. The new policy was encouraged by the U.S. Department of Housing and Urban Development. The change was motivated by concerns about the effects of second-hand smoke and by safety concerns. The policy will require resident smokers to leave the property, and violating the policy will result in terminating tenancy. Smoking cessation programs were made available at little to no cost.

== See also ==
- List of tallest buildings in Vermont

== Works cited ==
- Chittenden Country Historical Society, Historic Guide to Burlington Neighborhoods (vol. 1).
