= Grace Church (Rutland, Vermont) =

Protestant church in the United States

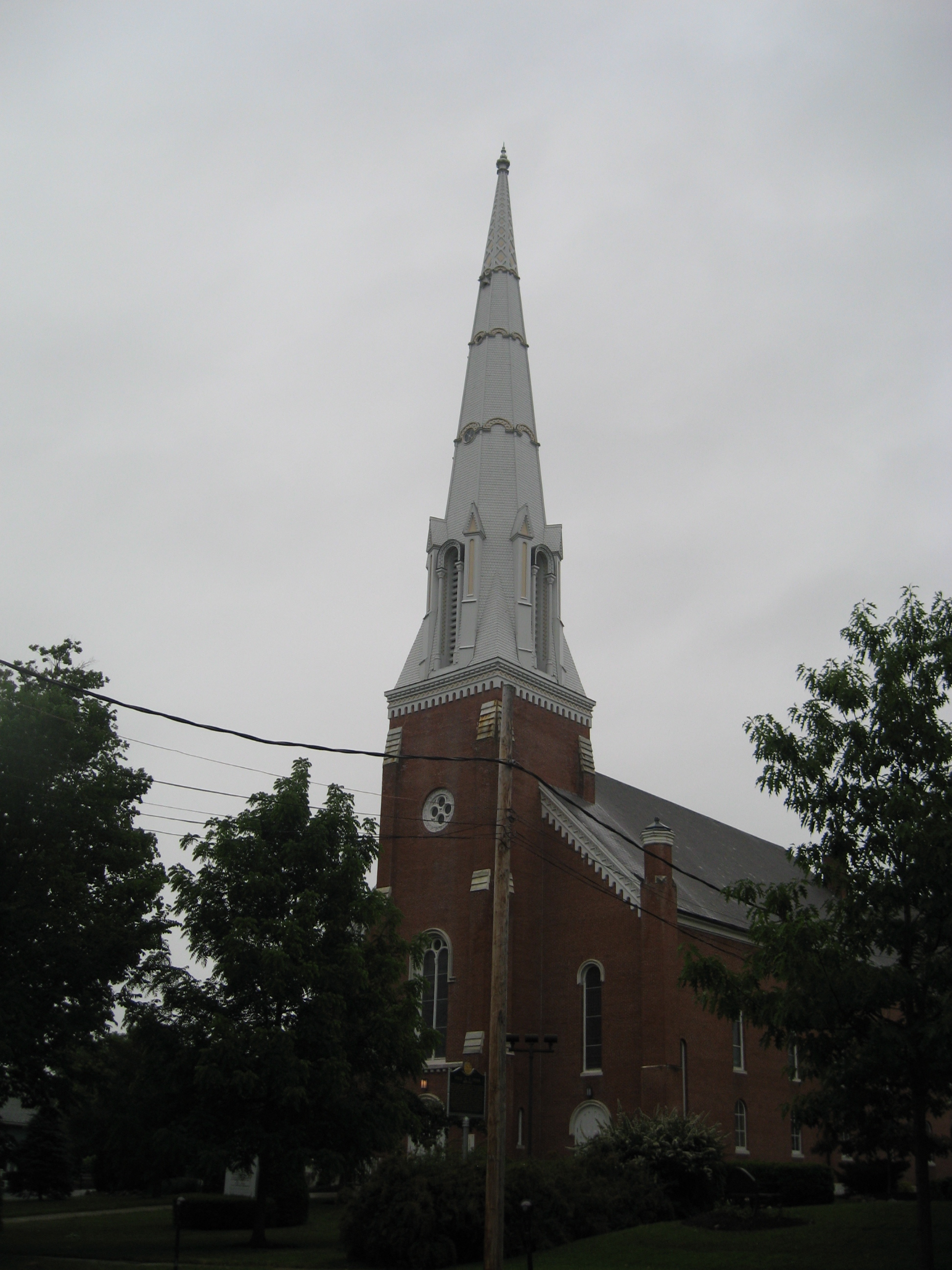
- Grace Church as seen from Court Street

Religion
- Affiliation: Protestant
- Ecclesiastical or organisational status: open

Location
- Location: Rutland, Vermont, United States
- Interactive map of Grace Church

Architecture
- Completed: 1860
- Height (max): 199 feet (61 m)

Grace Congregational United Church of Christ is a Protestant church located in Rutland, Vermont. Its address is 8 Court Street. At 199 feet (61 m) tall, it is the tallest building in Vermont.

== History ==
The church's congregation first gathered in 1788 as East Parish Congregational Church. The current church building was completed in 1860, overseen by a committee under John B. Page during the pastorship of Rev. Silas Aiken. Since then, the church building has undergone numerous renovations including the Aeolian Skinner organ being added in 1939 and the fellowship hall and "church school" wing in 1961. The church is currently affiliated with the United Church of Christ.

In 2021, the 6-foot (1.8 m) finial atop the spire was removed due to rot; it was set to be replaced by the spring of 2022.

== See also ==
- Joseph Hardy Neesima
