= Ohavi Zedek =

Synagogue in Burlington, Vermont, USA

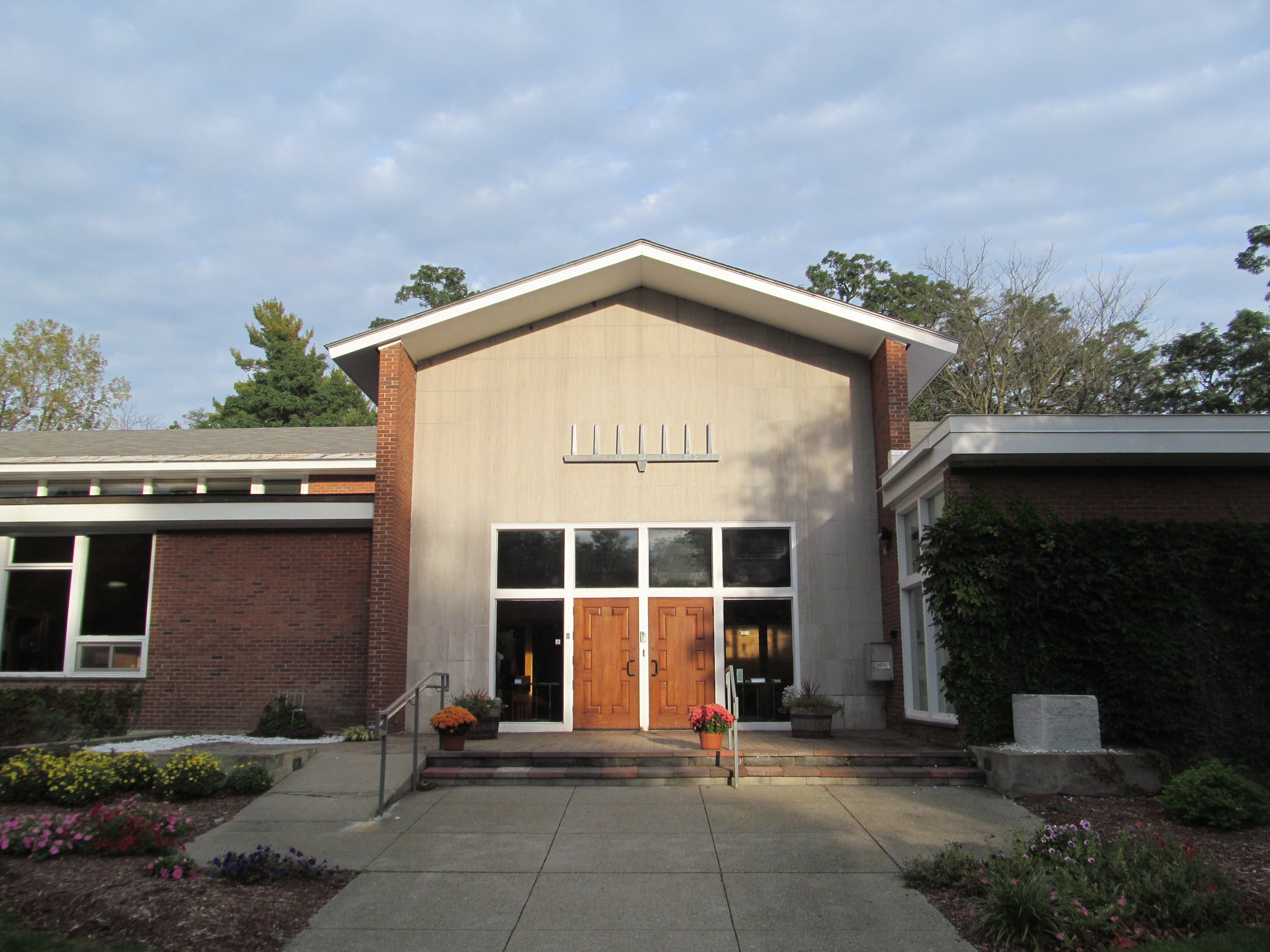
- The current Ohavi Zedek synagogue

- Location in Vermont

Religion
- Affiliation: Conservative Judaism
- Ecclesiastical or organisational status: Synagogue
- Leadership: Rabbi Aaron Philmus
- Status: Active

Location
- Location: 188 North Prospect Street, Burlington, Vermont 05401
- Country: United States
- Coordinates: 44°29′11″N 73°12′04″W

Architecture
- Established: 1876 (as a congregation)
- Completed: 1885 (Old Ohavi Zedek); 1952 (North Prospect St.)

Website
- ohavizedek.org

Ohavi Zedek (Hebrew for "Lovers of Justice") is a Conservative congregation and synagogue located at 188 North Prospect Street, in Burlington, Vermont, in the United States.

== History ==
Founded in 1876, it is the oldest Jewish congregation in Vermont. The synagogue's original building, Old Ohavi Zedek Synagogue, a brick Gothic Revival structure erected in 1885, is among the oldest synagogue buildings still standing in the United States. The building, at the corner of Archibald and Hyde Streets in Burlington, is listed on the National Register of Historic Places.

The congregation moved to its present location on North Prospect Street in 1952. The Archibald Street building is now occupied by Congregation Ahavath Gerim.

Today, Ohavi Zedek serves as home to a historic mural, known as the "Lost Mural", painted originally in 1910 by Ben Zion Black on the ceiling of another of Burlington's former synagogues, Chai Adam. The mural was moved to its new home in 2015. Since, the mural has been restored and is a unique surviving example of Eastern European synagogue art.

In 2019, the building was vandalized with inflammatory posters by Patriot Front.

== See also ==
- Oldest synagogues in the United States
