= St. Mary Star of the Sea (Newport, Vermont) =

Roman Catholic church

Coordinates: 44°55′55.3″N 72°12′50.5″W

St. Mary Star of the Sea, a Roman Catholic church, is located at the crest of Prospect Street, Newport, Vermont, overlooking Lake Memphremagog. It serves a community of more than 1000 families.

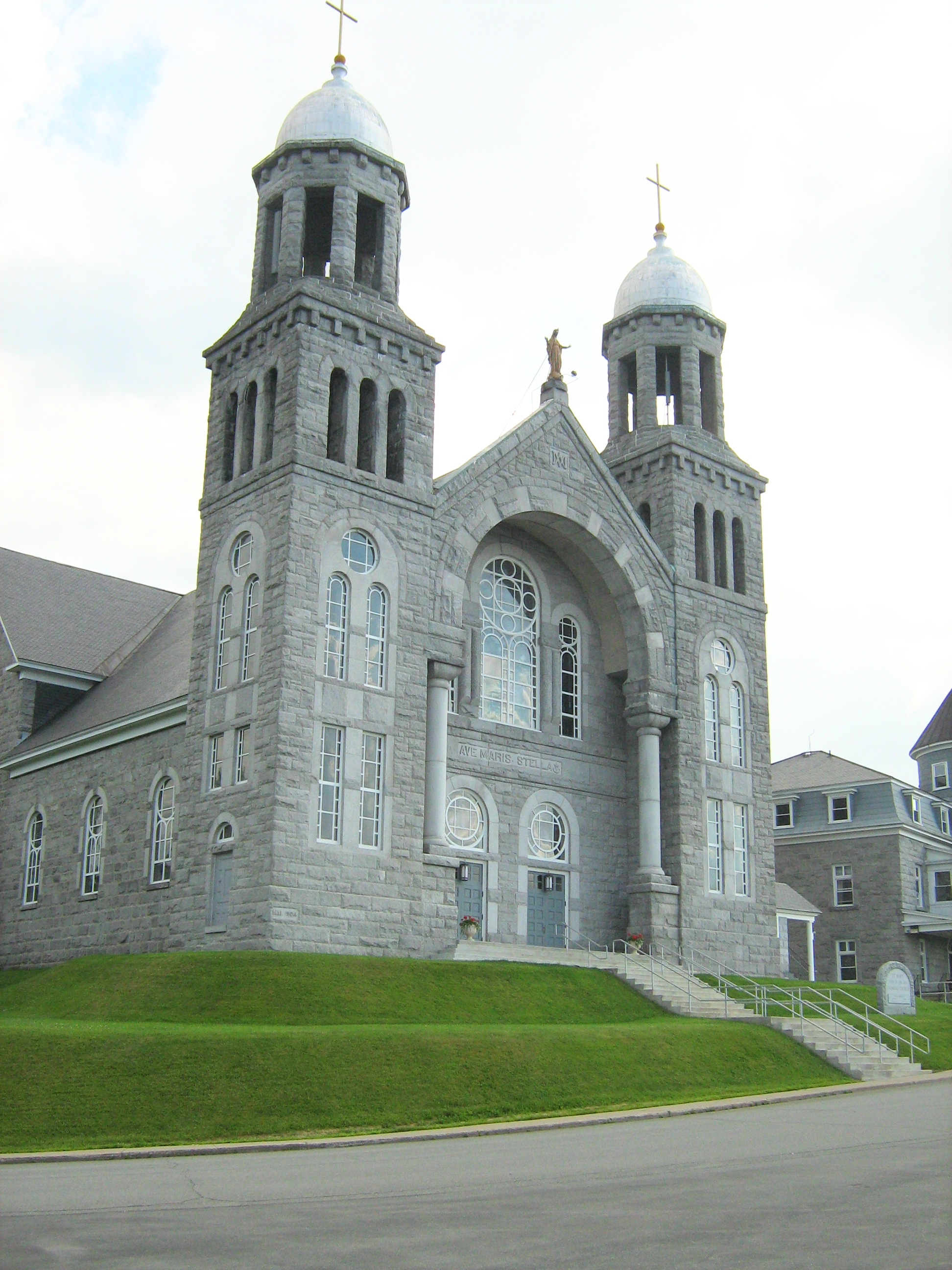

== History ==
An unknown Canadian priest celebrated the first mass in Newport in 1840 at a place called Indian Point.

The parish was founded in 1873 when Rev. John Stephen Michaud became its first resident pastor. For several years, he celebrated mass in a schoolhouse. In 1875, he purchased some land on a hillside overlooking the lake. Shortly after, the first St. Mary's was built on Pleasant Street, in what was then Newport Village. This wood-frame structure is now the Knights of Columbus Hall. The cornerstone for the building was laid on July 4, 1875, and the finished church, capable of seating 250, was blessed in 1877. The cost of the project, including grounds, was $6,135.37. The name, "Star of the Sea", was chosen because the view of the lake seemed to coincide with a venerable church title for Mary, the mother of Jesus.

The rectory was built in 1877 next to the west side of the church. Later, a wing was added for school classrooms. Children were taught, first by lay teachers, then by the Daughters of the Sacred Heart of Jesus, who arrived in 1905. This building still stands next to the Knights of Columbus hall.

In 1892, the congregation outgrew its church.

=== Granite church ===
Fr. Clermont acquired several parcels of land on Prospect Street. On one he built a wood-frame parish hall. This building later became the Sacred Heart School and Convent. Excavation for the church began in 1903. The cornerstone was laid in 1904.

From the quarries in and around Newport came granite stones, some of them 33 inches (84 cm) thick. The labor was by local stonecutters and other locals. The support was from the 350 or so parish families and the non-parishioners of the community. Clermont often labored with the construction workers.

The Daughters of Charity of the Sacred Heart of Jesus came from France at his request in 1905. They also staffed and operated the White House hospital, on a hill above the parish hall. The hospital eventually became Maison St. Joseph, a boarding residence for grade school age boys attending Sacred Heart School. These buildings no longer exist.

The church is Romanesque in style. It is approximately 114 by 72 feet (35 by 22 m). The two towers are 105 feet (32 m) high. It seats about 556 people in pews. The slope is 2 feet (0.61 m), allowing an unimpeded view of services.

The interior paintings, scenes from the Old and New Testaments, were recreated by N.O. Rochon, a local artist, with the permission of the French artist Tissaud.

There were financial problems. The Barton Savings Bank foreclosed on the new church in 1908. These problems were ultimately resolved. Part of the solution involved selling the school building to the teaching nuns.

Resting at the highest point of the peninsula of Newport, the church with its twin spires, gold crosses and statue of the Virgin Mary was formally dedicated August 1, 1909.

It is rumored that the scene on the church ceiling was done by Charles Hardin Andrus, a then famous local artist.

A local paper described the building in 2007 as a "powerful..presence."

In 2011, a local television channel began broadcasting Sunday mass.

== School ==
The original school convened in a converted horse barn which "kept a whiff of its original purpose...no matter [how hard it was cleaned]." Enrollment increased from 40 students in 1906 to 190 in 1910, to 400 in 1918. The school reached a peak of over 600 in the 1960s in 12 grades. The first 8th grade class graduated in 1914. Additions to the building were constructed in 1919, 1937, 1944, and 1947. In 1940, Sacred Heart High School was dedicated. In 1943 the first two graduates of the high school matriculated.

As there were few Catholic schools in the county and inadequate transportation, some children boarded, including those in elementary school. In the 1930s and 40s, there were 60 girl boarders and a similar number of boys. All girls were in the same dorm on cots supervised by four nuns. Baths were taken once a week. Meals were taken in silence accompanied by religious readings by students. The readings were all in French, as the nuns were all Francophones. Up until 1953, all grades were located in the same building.

A newer high school building was constructed from 1951 until February 1953 when students moved in. Sacred Heart High School held classes until it closed in 1988. At that time, elementary classes were moved into the former high school. The elementary school closed in 2007 when the sisters who owned the building expelled the school.

The boys' basketball team won the Vermont state Division I championship in 1968. Vermont Principals Association] The boys' baseball team won the Vermont state Division IV championship in 1985. Vermont Principals Association] The boys' soccer team won the Vermont state Division I championship in 1969. The boys' soccer team won the Vermont state Division II championship in 1979. The boys' soccer team won the Vermont state Division III championship in 1981. 1982 and 1984

=== Principals ===
Principals included Sister Marie de la Assumption (1934-) Garry F.Coburn (1984-1986)

== Pastors ==
1. Rev. John Stephen Michaud 1873-1877? (later the second bishop of Burlington)
2. Rev. Norbert Proulx 1877?-1892?
3. Fr. Antoine P. Clermont 1892-1908
4. Rev. J.M.H. Bastien 1909-1921
5. Rev. Norbert LaChance 1921-1944
6. Rev. Damase Carrieres 1944-1961
7. Msgr. Leopold C. Bastien 1961-1966, nephew of JMH Bastien
8. Rev. J. H. Dussault 1967-1978
9. Fr. Charles Davignon 1986- 1988
10. Rev. Forrest Rouelle 1988-1998
11. Rev. Yvon J. Royer 2006-2009
12. Rev. Michael Reardon 2009-2015
13. Rev. Patrick Nwachukwu 2015-2017
14. Rev. Rijo Johnson 2017-

== Cell tower controversy ==
The parish received news coverage in 2004 due to a controversy over the placement of cellular transmitters and receivers in the three belltowers of the church. Members of the parish were concerned over health risks the equipment may cause, the use of a place of spiritual worship for profit, and a city bylaw mandating that no building may have more than one use. The church attempted to pull out of the contract because of these reasons. The issues were resolved and the towers were erected in 2007.

== See also ==
- List of tallest buildings in Vermont
