= Silas Aiken =

American religious author and minister

Silas Aiken

Silas Aiken (Bedford, New Hampshire, 1799–1869) was an American religious author and minister. For many years he was minister at Park Street Church in Boston, Massachusetts.

Aiken was born in 1799 to Phineas Aiken and Elizabeth Patterson. The Aikens had emigrated from Northern Ireland to the Colony of New Hampshire in 1729, and Phineas Aiken was a farmer, member of the Presbyterian church, and American Revolutionary War veteran. Silas Aiken graduated from Phillips Academy, Andoverin 1819, became a Christian at age nineteen and graduated from Dartmouth College in 1825 as the valedictorian of his class. He then taught and studied at the college for three more years in preparation for the ministry. After this period, Aiken was selected as a pastor of the Congregational Church in Amherst, New Hampshire, one of the largest in the state at the time, and the congregation soon underwent a revival. In 1835 Aiken became the pastor of Park Street Church in Boston. Park Street underwent several revivals during Aiken's tenure at the church. While pastoring Park Street, Aiken visited every member of the church at least once per year. In 1849 Aiken left Park Street to pastor the East Parish Congregational Church in Rutland, Vermont. He later received a D.D. from the University of Vermont. Silas Aiken died in 1869 and had selected a younger co-pastor, Norman Seaver, as a successor and Seaver was serving with Aiken at the time of his death.

== Works ==
- The duties of the churches in respect to infant baptism. 1865.
- Aiken, Silas (Jan 2, 1848). Posthumous influence: a sermon, occasioned by the death of Hon. Samuel Hubbard, L.L.D. BiblioBazaar. ISBN 9781275834224.
