= Peter Banner =

English-born American architect

- Born: 1749/50; England
- Died: July 5, 1835; Brookline, Massachusetts, United States
- Occupation: Architect

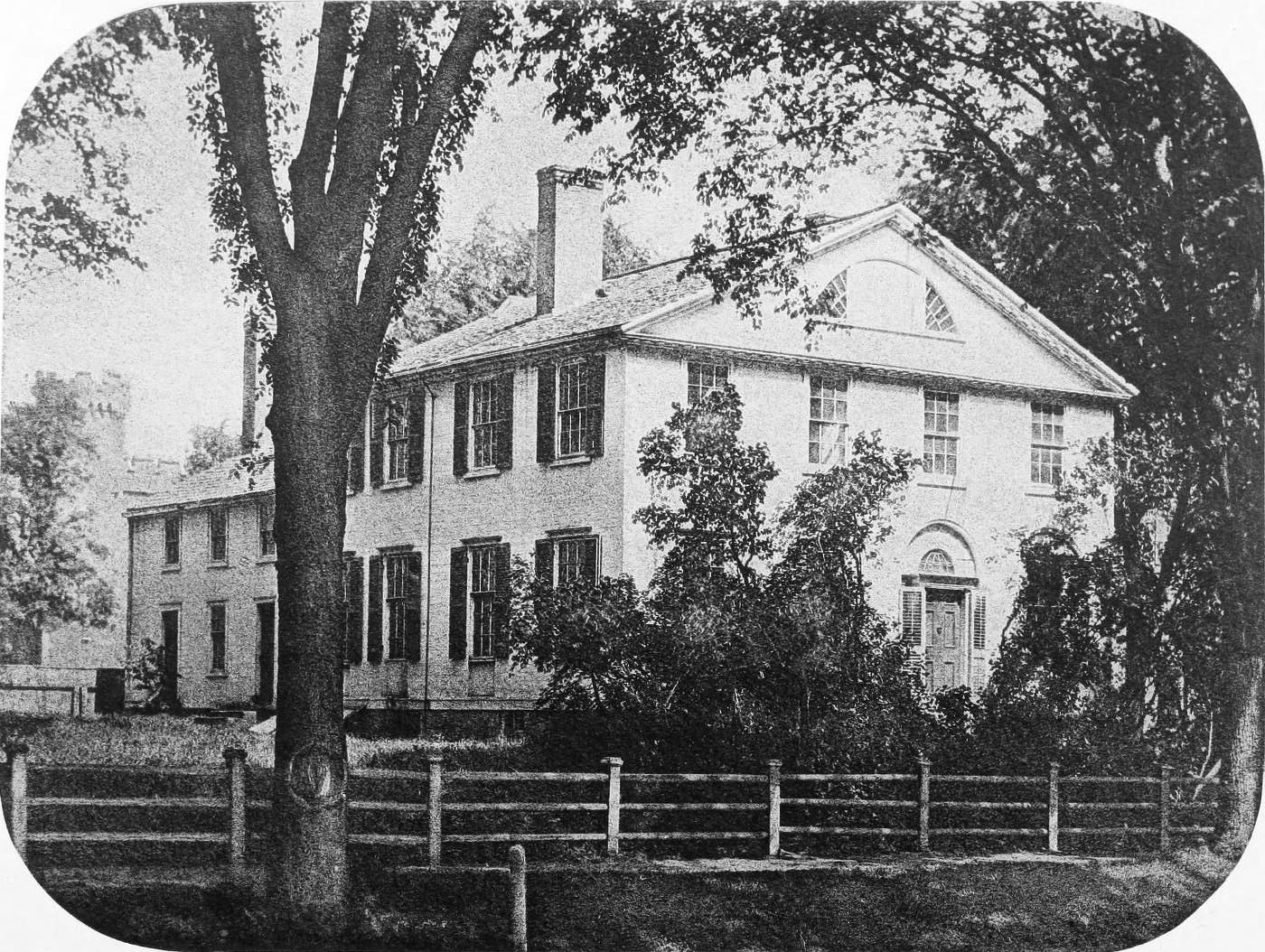
The now-demolished president's house of Yale College, designed and built by Banner in the Federal style and completed in 1799

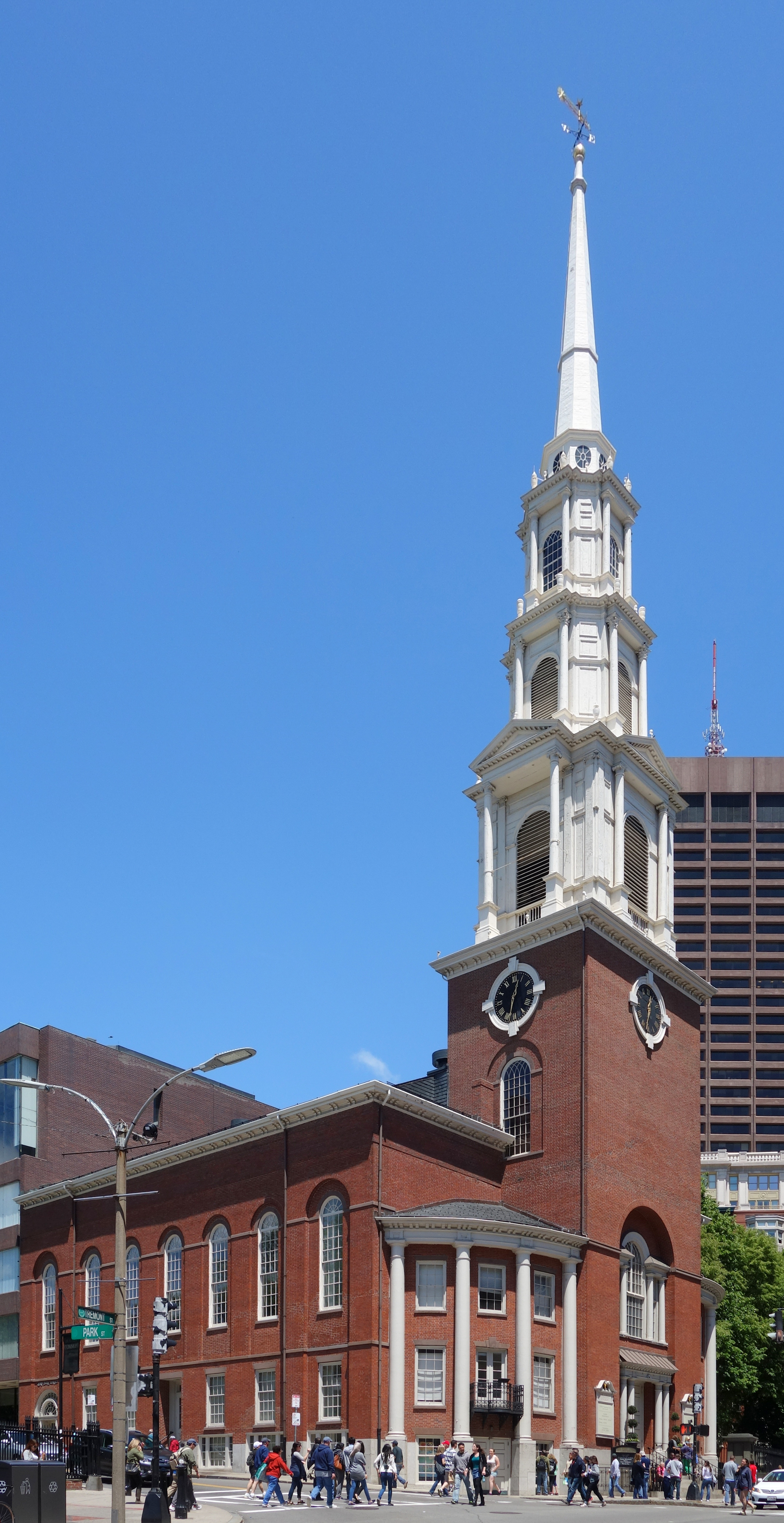
Park Street Church in Boston, designed and built by Banner in the Federal style and completed in 1809

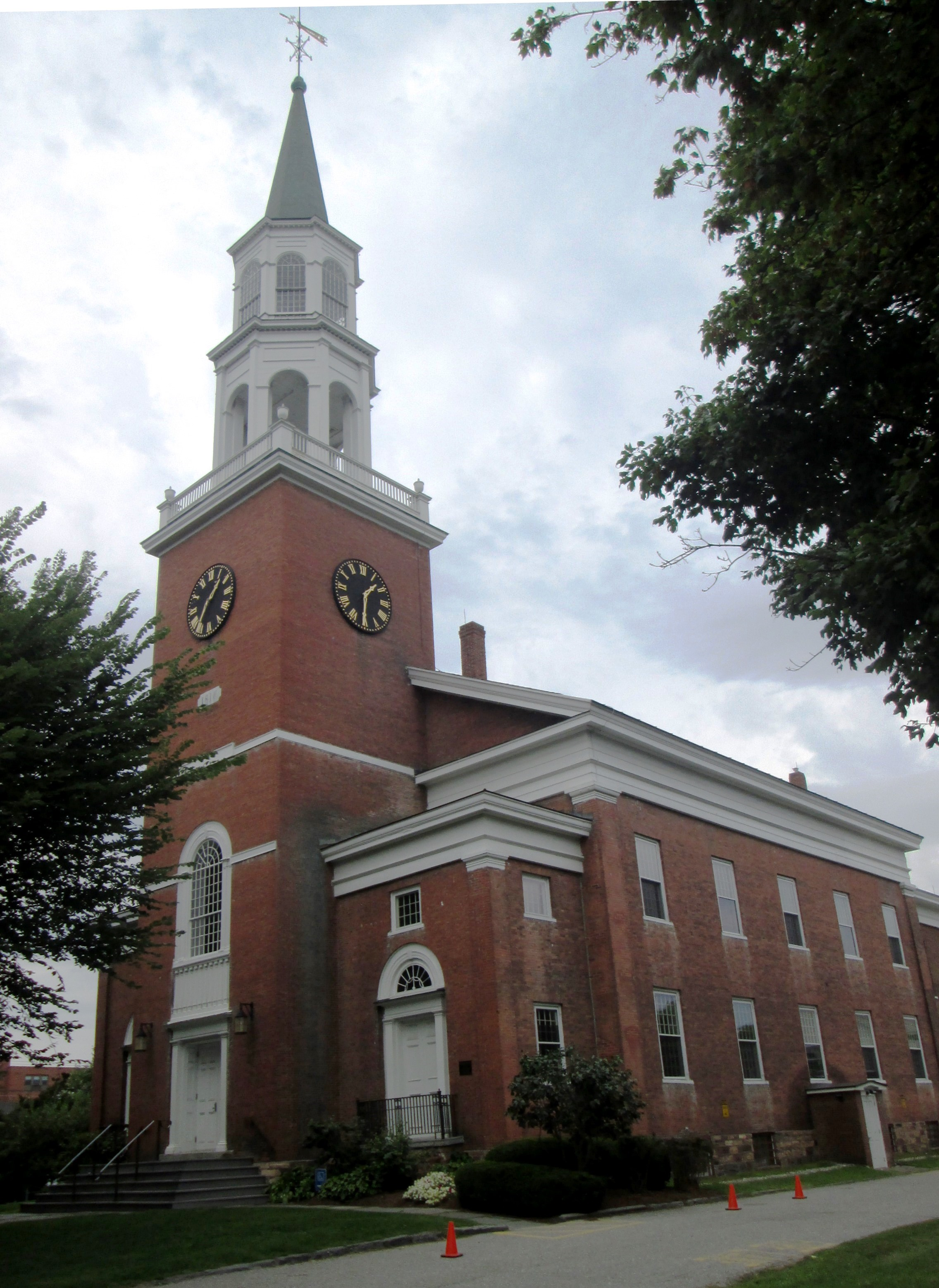
The Unitarian Church in Burlington, Vermont, designed by Banner in the Federal style and completed in 1817

Peter Banner (1749/50 – July 5, 1835) was an English-born American architect and builder who designed the Park Street Church in Boston, Massachusetts, and other buildings in New England in the early 19th century.

== Early life and English career ==
Peter Banner was born in December 1749 or January 1750 in England. English architectural historian Andrew Saint describes him as being "from a prominent Finsbury building family." Banner and two family members, Henry Banner (died 1784), who was at one time City Carpenter, and John Banner, were involved in the development of Banner Street and Banner Square (1777, destroyed), which was planned by George Dance the Younger. His role in this and other speculative projects in Finsbury contributed to later financial difficulties. In 1785 he was the contractor responsible for the rebuilding of the Borough Compter (1785, demolished) in Southwark, also designed by Dance. In 1787, as a member of the Society of Master Carpenters in London, he had a role in attempts to resolve a strike of journeymen carpenters of that year. The first of at least two bankruptcies came in late 1789, his property being sold to settle his debts in 1790. In 1791 he was awarded the carpentry contract of the Church of St John-at-Hackney (1797), designed by architect James Spiller, but by 1793 he was again in financial difficulties and stopped work, going bankrupt in June. In the aftermath, architect Spiller argued that Banner's proposal had been made incompetently.

== American career ==
Banner appears to have immigrated to the United States to escape his creditors in 1794. The first notice of his presence is the New York City directory for 1795, in which he appears as a house carpenter and master builder. Nothing about his work in New York is known, and in 1798 he moved to New Haven, Connecticut. He first refers to himself as an "Architect [and Builder]" in a newspaper advertisement of that year. In New Haven he completed several buildings for Yale College, beginning with the president's house (1799, demolished 1860). This house was among the earliest examples of fully developed Federal architecture in Connecticut. He followed this with two buildings of the Old Brick Row: Berkeley Hall (1802, demolished) and the Connecticut Lyceum (1804, demolished). Here, the college had him adopt a more conservative style to match the existing buildings of the row. In New Haven he also engaged in further land speculation, which may have caused him new financial difficulties.

In the spring of 1804 he sold all his New Haven property and moved to Boston, where his presence is first documented in 1805. His early works in and around Boston included the mansion of Ebenezer Crafts (1805, demolished) in Roxbury and the church of the First Parish in Brookline (1806, demolished 1848). In these works Banner returned to the Federal style. During this period he was also superintendent of at least part of India Wharf, designed by Charles Bulfinch. He followed these with the Park Street Church (1809), his best known work. Here he again utilized the Federal style but crowned the building with a spire derived from the work of Scottish architect James Gibbs. He also completed two houses for Old South Church (1811, demolished) about the same time. During the War of 1812 he again engaged in land speculation but any architectural or building work is unknown.

Though best remembered as an architect, Banner was a skilled carpenter-joiner and mason, as well as a contractor, working on his own buildings. Only in his last known works was Banner's role exclusively as architect–distance making direct execution impossible. After soliciting plans from both Banner and Charles Bulfinch, the building committee of the Unitarian Church (1817) of Burlington, Vermont, selected Banner's proposal. The completed building, built without Banner's supervision, was a simplified version of the Park Street Church. His last known work was the first Antiquarian Hall (1820, demolished 1911) for the American Antiquarian Society in Worcester, Massachusetts. Banner last appears in the Boston directories in 1828.

== Personal life and death ==
Banner appears to have been married twice. The name of his first wife is not known, though they had at least one son, also named Peter, to whom a grandson was born in Worcester in 1834. In 1826 he married second to a Miss Elizabeth Wiser. In later life he settled in Brookline, where he died July 5, 1835, at the age of 86 years and 6 months.

== Selected designs ==
- 1799 – President's house, Yale College, New Haven, Connecticut
- 1802 – Berkeley Hall, Yale College, New Haven, Connecticut
- 1804 – Connecticut Lyceum, Yale College, New Haven, Connecticut
- 1805 – Ebenezer Crafts house, Roxbury, Massachusetts
- 1806 – First Parish in Brookline, Brookline, Massachusetts
- 1809 – Park Street Church, Boston
- 1811 – Old South Church parish houses, Boston
- 1817 – Unitarian Church, Burlington, Vermont
- 1820 – Antiquarian Hall, Worcester, Massachusetts

All of these works, with the exception of the Park Street Church and the Unitarian Church in Burlington, have been destroyed.
