= First Parish in Brookline =

Unitarian Universalist church in Massachusetts, US

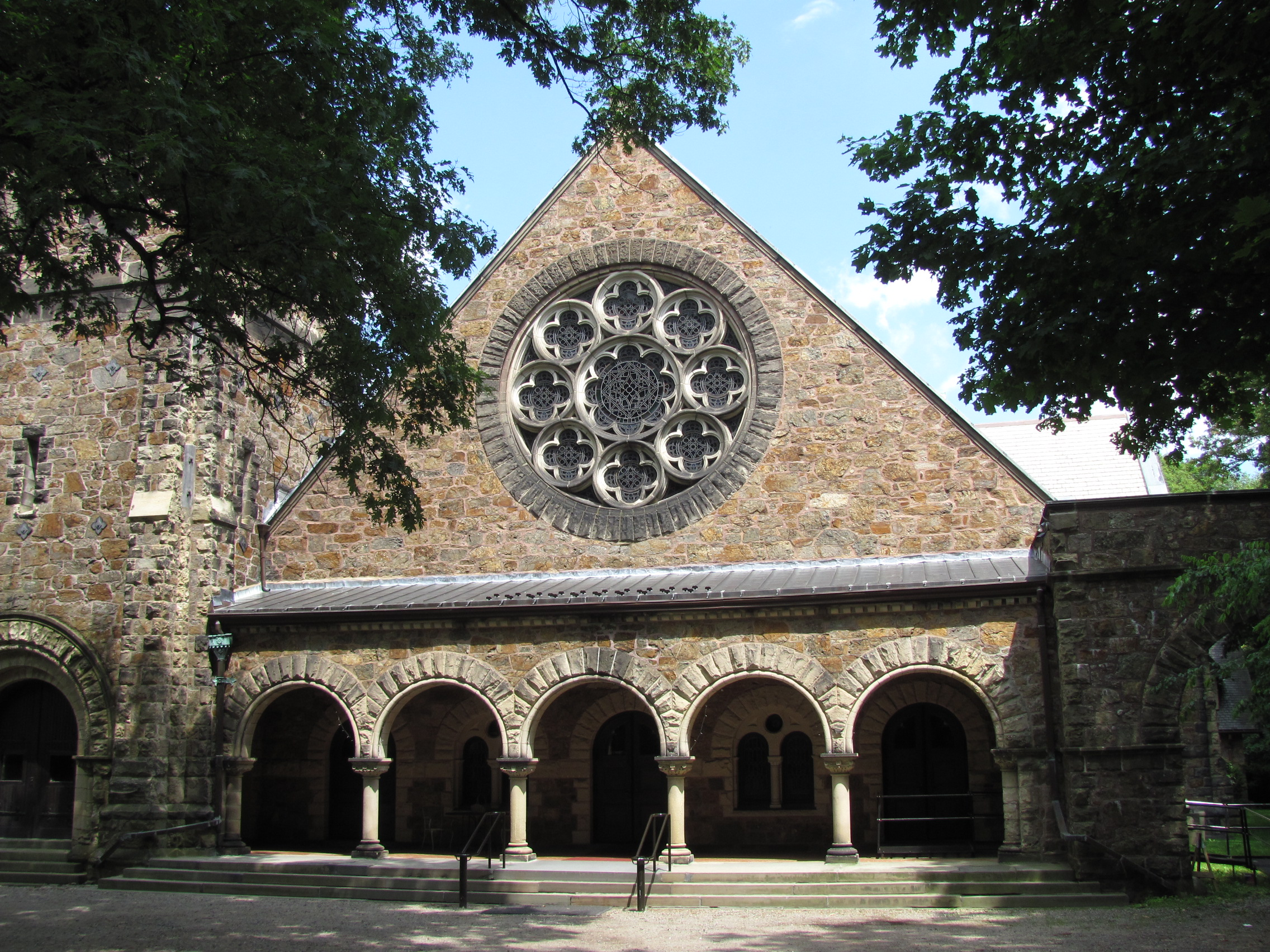
- First Parish in 2010
- First Parish in Brookline
- 42.327140°N 71.130670°W
- Denomination: Unitarian Universalist
- Previous denomination: Christian
- Website: firstparishinbrookline.org

History
- Founded: October 26, 1717

First Parish in Brookline is a Unitarian Universalist church in Brookline, Massachusetts. It is a Welcoming Congregation and a member of the Unitarian Universalist Association. The church has existed for over 300 years, in several different meeting houses in the town of Brookline. The church is also notable for its stained glass windows.

== History ==
The church began functioning as both a meetinghouse for the town of Brookline as well as a Puritan church, ordained by the General Court in 1631; the church and the town functioned as one. The church was gathered in the original meetinghouse on October 26, 1717, though it was built in 1714, in the first of four buildings as The Church of Christ. James Allen was called to be the first minister of the church and was ordained on November 5, 1718. He served until his death on February 18, 1747. Cotton Brown succeeded Allen. Following a fire in the first meeting house, the second meeting house was built in 1805 by Peter Banner, and was dedicated on June 11, 1806, in a speech by Reverend John Pierce.

In 1833, the Constitution of Massachusetts was amended, and it effectively cut all ties between the church and the local government, which included funding. This led to the founding of the First Parish in Brookline as opposed to the Church of Christ, as it had previously been known. The third meeting house was constructed and dedicated in 1848 by Edward C. Cabot near the end of John Pierce's ministry, who is the longest serving minister in the history of the church. During this time, there was discussion regarding the church's denomination. In 1828, a Baptist church was organized in Brookline as well as Harvard Church in 1844, now the United Parish in Brookline, and St. Paul's Church, an Episcopal congregation, in 1849. However, it was ultimately decided that the church was Unitarian, though no official change was initially made. This later led to the church accepting the Unitarian Universalist faith after the Unitarian Universalist Association's formation in 1961.

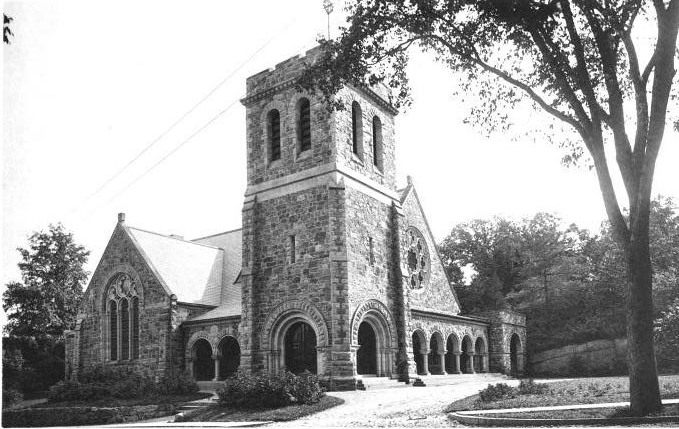
The fourth meeting house in 1906, 13 years after its construction

The fourth and current meeting house was first proposed in 1886 by then minister Howard N. Brown. The church acquired the meeting house of the town of Brookline in 1890. The construction of the fourth meeting house was completed in 1893, and the dedication happened on April 19 of the same year.

In 1943, the church made all pews free instead of having members of the church rent them as they had before.

== Interior ==
Many of the sections of the church are named after important individuals or families in the church's history. These include the Dana Room, Lyon Chapel, the Peterson Room, and Pierce Hall, which was purchased by First Parish in 1890 after it was used as a public school.

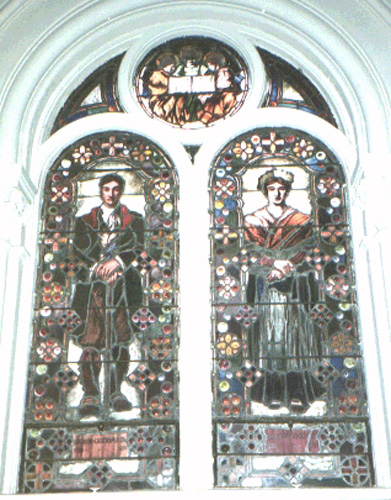
The John and Hannah Goddard memorial window in the church's sanctuary

=== Stained glass windows ===
The church's interior contains 21 individual stained glass windows, designed mainly by Louis C. Tiffany, Sarah Whitman, and Charles Connick. Tiffany's were built around 1895, while the others were built during different time periods. The windows are notable as they are largely American-made as opposed to imported, as many stained glass windows of the time were. Many of the windows were commissioned by members of the church to memorialize members of their families, such as the Lowell family window, or figures from Christianity. The Goddard memorial window depicts John Goddard and his wife, Hannah, was designed by George H. Hallowell and built by Otto Heinigke, and dedicated in 1912. It was featured in an art exhibit in 1998. In 2010, multiple windows underwent repair after many years of aging and deterioration.

== Notable events ==
On October 27, 1880, Theodore Roosevelt married his first wife Alice Hathaway Lee Roosevelt in the church.

In 2011, the film That's My Boy (originally titled I Hate You, Dad) was partially filmed in the church.

== List of ministers ==
- James Allen: 1718–47
- John Walley: 1746–47
- Cotton Brown: 1747–50
- Robert Rogerson: 1753–55
- Nathaniel Potter: 1755–59
- Joseph Jackson: 1760–96
- John Pierce: 1797–1849
- Frederick N. Knapp: 1847–56
- Frederic H. Hedge: 1856–72
- Howard N. Brown: 1873–95
- William H. Lyon: 1896–1915
- Abbot Peterson: 1915–42
- Carl Bihldorff: 1942–75
- Michael Boardman: 1975–87
- Thomas J. S. Mikelson (Note: Served as an Interim Minister.): 1987–88
- David A. Johnson, Emeritus: 1988–2003
- Judith Downing: 2003–05
- Martha F. Niebanck, Emerita: 2005–12
- Dr. Jim Sherblom: 2005–16
- Dr. Maria Cristina Vlassidis Burgoa (Note: Served as an Assistant Minister.): 2013–2016
- Rebecca M. Bryan: 2016–2018
- Lisa Perry-Wood: 2018–2023
- Joe Cherry: 2023–present
