= Burlington Electric Department =

Electric utility in Vermont, US

The Burlington Electric Department (BED) is a municipally owned electric utility of Burlington, Vermont. It is the largest municipally owned electric utility in Vermont. It has over 19,600 customers. It is the only utility providing electricity to the city and the Burlington International Airport.

== Generating plants ==
BED operates and owns 50% of the J. C. McNeil wood-powered electric generating facility. When the facility was constructed in 1984, it was the world’s largest wood-burning generating plant. It still is one of the largest today. BED also owns and operates the Winooski One hydro facility, a gas turbine, and two solar installations.

== History ==
The utility was created in 1905, after city officials grew dissatisfied with the investor-owned Burlington Light and Power Company and its pricing.

The 30-megawatt coal-fired Moran Municipal Generation Station, named for Mayor J.E. Moran, was completed in 1954. It was decommissioned in 1986. The city has planned to convert it to recreation or museum use.

=== Historic building ===
Burlington Electric Department's Pine Street campus was featured as a "Hidden Treasure". It was built around 1969 by architect Julian Goodrich of Freeman French Freeman, and is dedicated to BED's Superintendent from 1954 to 1975, William A. Stebbins. It is "an excellent example of the International Style" with curtain wall construction. The building has two porte-cochères.

== Alleged Russian software hack ==
On December 30, 2016, The Washington Post reported that Russian hackers had penetrated the U.S. electric grid through the Burlington Electric computer system. After some elementary fact-checking, journalist Glenn Greenwald reported that this had not happened. A day later, the Post updated the story to say that there was "no indication" that Russian hackers had penetrated the electric grid and that the computer that had been hacked was not connected to it. Regardless, Vermont Governor Peter Shumlin said on Dec 30,"This episode should highlight the urgent need for our federal government to vigorously pursue and put an end to this sort of Russian meddling".
