= Moran Municipal Generation Station =

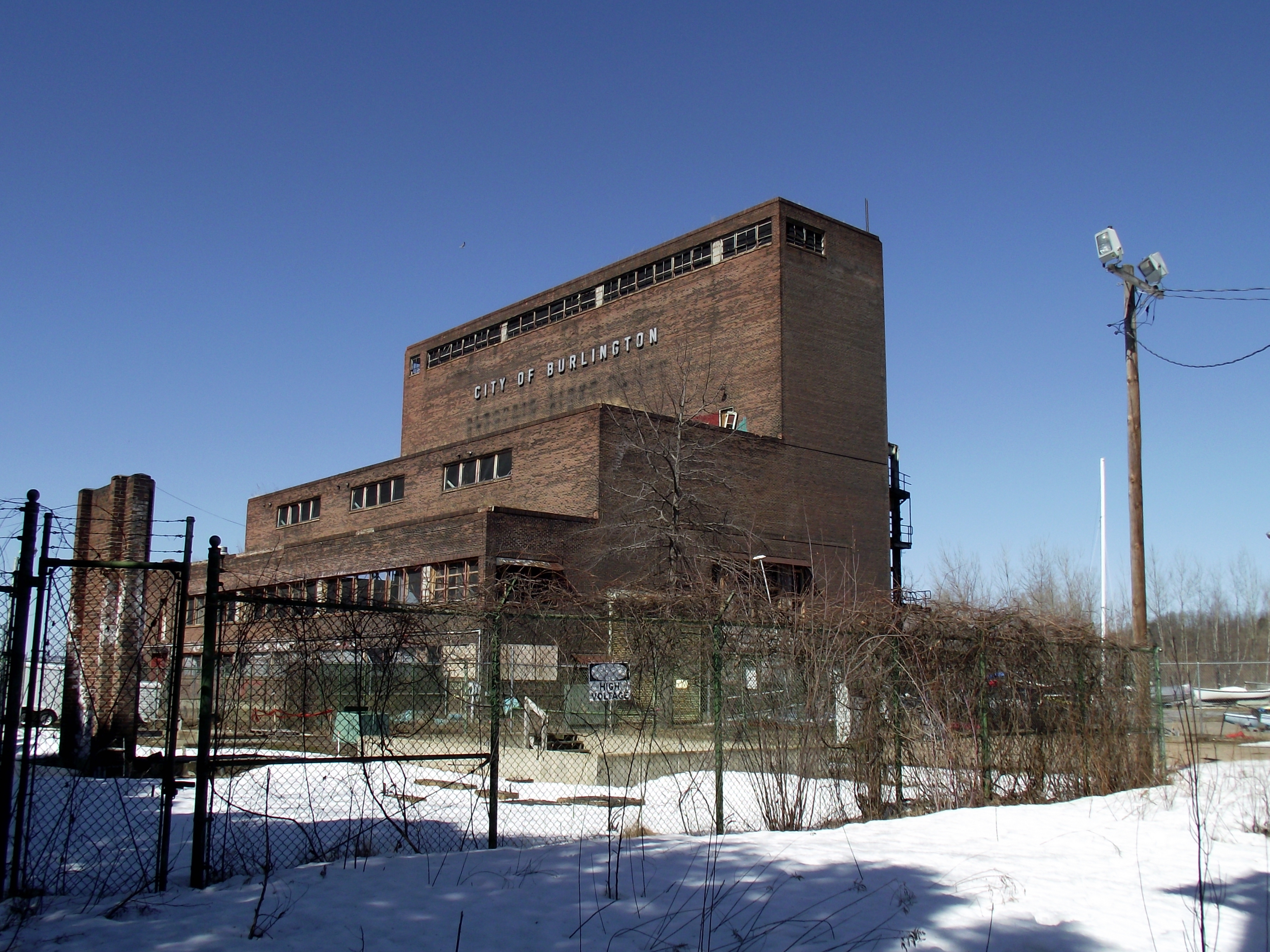
- Moran Municipal Generation Station from the Burlington Bike Path

- Location within Vermont
- Alternative names: Moran Plant

General information
- Architectural style: Modern, mid-20th century brick industrial
- Location: Burlington, Vermont, United States
- Coordinates: 44°28′53″N 73°13′24″W
- Elevation: 100 ft (30 m)
- Current tenants: Burlington Sailing
- Construction started: July, 1952
- Completed: Summer, 1955
- Owner: City of Burlington, VT

Technical details
- Floor count: 5
- Floor area: 66,972 sq ft (6,221.9 m^{2})

Design and construction
- Architects: J.F. Pritchard & Co.
- Moran Municipal Generation Station
- U.S. National Register of Historic Places
- NRHP reference No.: 10001041
- Added to NRHP: December 17, 2010

The Moran Municipal Generation Station is a former 30-megawatt power plant known for its architecture and innovation built in Burlington, Vermont from 1952 to 1955. It is now a derelict structure that will be redeveloped to encourage year-round use, economic activity and public access. The Moran Plant is located at 475 Lake Street on the Burlington waterfront. It is named for Burlington mayor J.E. Moran.

The Moran Plant was decommissioned in 1986. Since then, the building has been vacant, except for a small portion of the basement utilized by the Lake Champlain Community Sailing Center. Ownership of the station was transferred from the Burlington Electric Department to the City of Burlington in 1990. In 2010, the city began executing plans for a rehabilitation of the plant and site.

== History ==
In 1948, after a series of power shortages, the Burlington Electric Department argued that a new electric plant was now a critical need. Mayor Moran supported the plan.

In 1951, Burlington Electric Department and the City of Burlington water department jointly purchased the lot that the Moran Plant sits on from the Central Vermont Railway. The contract for the new plant was awarded to Pierce Consulting Engineering Company in September. In November, voters approved a $4 million bond required for implementation. BED commissioners selected the Vermont Construction Company Inc. to erect the plant. The 1952 steel strike caused a six-week delay, and ground was broken in July 1952. The situation continued to deteriorate. Vermont Construction found itself in severe fiscal distress and Pierce Consulting's plans were decreed to be not only poor but also $2.2 million over budget. Both companies were dropped from the project and replaced by J.F. Pritchard Company in January 1953.

The plant was fully completed in the summer of 1955. The Moran's three turbine generators and power switchgear assemblies, sold and installed by General Electric, Westinghouse and Allis-Chalmers, accounted for just over $1 million.

The plant – formally named the J. Edward Moran Municipal Generating Station in 1962 – quickly became a source of angst for those who lived and worked downwind of it. Waste expelled from the smokestacks drifted down and covered everything within its path with a thick, black crust. Laundry hung out to dry was immediately dirty again, windows were covered in soot and multiple respiratory problems were reported. Burlington Electric Department made a series of changes to the plants to reduce the pollution. Although some improvement was noted, problems would persist throughout the 1960s and 1970s.

The Moran Plant's role as a backup source of power was important in keeping the city illuminated during the Northeast blackout of 1965.

=== Changes ===
The 1970s energy crisis forced the Burlington Electric Department to seek new sources of fuel. In 1977, Burlington Electric Department employees tried an experimental conversion of one of the firing units from coal to wood chips mixed with one part of heating oil. Wood chips cost $12 per ton, as opposed to $50 – a savings of 0.7¢. At a cost of $25,000 this in-house conversion took four months from design to fabrication and installation. The unit was retooled without federal grants or other technical assistance. Steampipes were recycled from other boilers and an old first-aid kit was used for the control box. Approved by the New England Power Pool after a brief, three-week testing period this conversion gained global attention. A second coal-fired unit was successfully converted at the Moran during the summer of 1979. The Moran plant used more than 100,000 t of wood chips for fuel in addition to 60,670,000 pounds (27,520,000 kg), 5,400,000 cubic yards (4,100,000 m^{3}) of natural gas, and 121,011 US gallons (458,080 L) of No. 2 fuel oil in 1983.

During the 1970s, most of the power supply for Burlington came from the Moran Plant, and its three 1950s-vintage, 10-MW stoker coal-fired units, struggled to meet Burlington's electric load growth. The aging of the Moran Plant, and its outdated emission controls prompted the Burlington Electric Department to examine ways to provide additional generating capacity to meet the city's needs.

The Moran Plant was decommissioned in 1986. It was replaced by the McNeil Generating Station, a wood-chip burning facility at another location in Burlington. The boilers, exterior coal conveyor and stacks were removed, although the majority of the supporting steel framework was left in place. On the interior, the turbines and other equipment were also removed. Since then, the building has largely sat vacant, save for a small portion of the basement utilized by the Lake Champlain Community Sailing Center for boat storage. Ownership of the station was formally transferred from BED to the City of Burlington in 1990. In 2010, the city began executing plans for an ambitious rehabilitation of the plant and site for mixed community use.

=== Redevelopment ===
The City of Burlington has set forth the following principles to guide the redevelopment of the Moran Plant:

- Ensure permanent public ownership and control
- Create year-round use
- Create and extend elements of the Waterfront Park
- Minimize undue traffic and parking issues
- Retain the Lake Champlain Sailing Center
- Provide opportunity for new public and private partnerships
- Utilize the existing building shell where cost-effective
- Retain historical elements of interior of North Tower when possible
- Generate income for operations and maintenance
- Keep development costs reasonable
- Utilize the highest standards in energy conservation and green building construction

Burlington voters approved a $21 million renovation plan for the Moran plant on March 4, 2008. It passed overwhelmingly approximately 11,000 to 700. Mayor Bob Kiss wanted to turn the Moran Plant into a sailing center, children's museum and ice climbing facility. Opponents wanted the old power plant to be torn down. An advisory question on the ballot asked whether Burlington residents wanted to demolish the plant and create a park. That measure was defeated by 874 votes.

The Vermont legislature approved a public financing scheme for the Moran Plant in September 2009. At its September 10 meeting, the legislature's Joint Fiscal Committee voted to let Burlington borrow money for infrastructure improvements in anticipation of future tax revenues generated through 2015 on the existing waterfront and the downtown tax increment finance district.

== Building ==
=== Exterior ===
The Moran has a two-part exterior: load-bearing, masonry frame consisting of concrete masonry units with a brick header course every two rows, and a brick veneer laid in a common bond with seventh course header rows. Some bricks have detached and some are delaminating. The tall northerly block of the Moran is distinguished by not only its height, but also by the remains of a massive exterior steel boiler structure.

=== Interior ===
The Moran Plant has an exposed, floating interior steel frame which engages the exterior, load-bearing masonry walls. Finishes have been significantly vandalized and large areas exhibit wholesale loss, breakage and graffiti.

The basement, although the sluiceways had been dammed in the late 20th century, remained partially flooded until 2010 and contained a considerable amount of submerged industrial and contaminated debris. Although the turbines were removed on decommissioning in 1986, their massive concrete cradles were left in place – as were three substantial coal hoppers and remnants of industrial fixtures, including the coal conveyor on the upper level of the hopper block and large copper coil units on the second level of the turbine block. Throughout the building, remnants of steel stairs, catwalks and related structural supports connect the different areas.

== Significance ==
The Moran Municipal Generation Station is on the National Register of Historic Places. It was listed on December 17, 2010. Its applicable National Register Criteria were, "Property is associated with events that have made a significant contribution to the broad patterns of our history," and "Property embodies the distinctive characteristics of a type, period, or method of construction or represents the work of a master, or possesses high artistic values, or represents a significant and distinguishable entity whose components lack individual distinction."

The mid-century coal-fired electricity-generating plant was the only one of its kind erected in Vermont and gained international acclaim for innovative uses and adaptations of existing technologies. Pritchard's design for the Moran Plant, which was featured in Architectural Record, may have been influenced by the 1950 Sewaren Generating Station in Woodbridge, New Jersey, which followed a similar, stepped plan (a three-story service building, a taller turbine room, and an even taller coal bunker with exterior boiler structure and stacks).

== See also ==
- National Register of Historic Places listings in Chittenden County, Vermont
