= Masonic Temple (Burlington, Vermont) =

- Burlington Masonic Temple
- U.S. Historic district – Contributing property
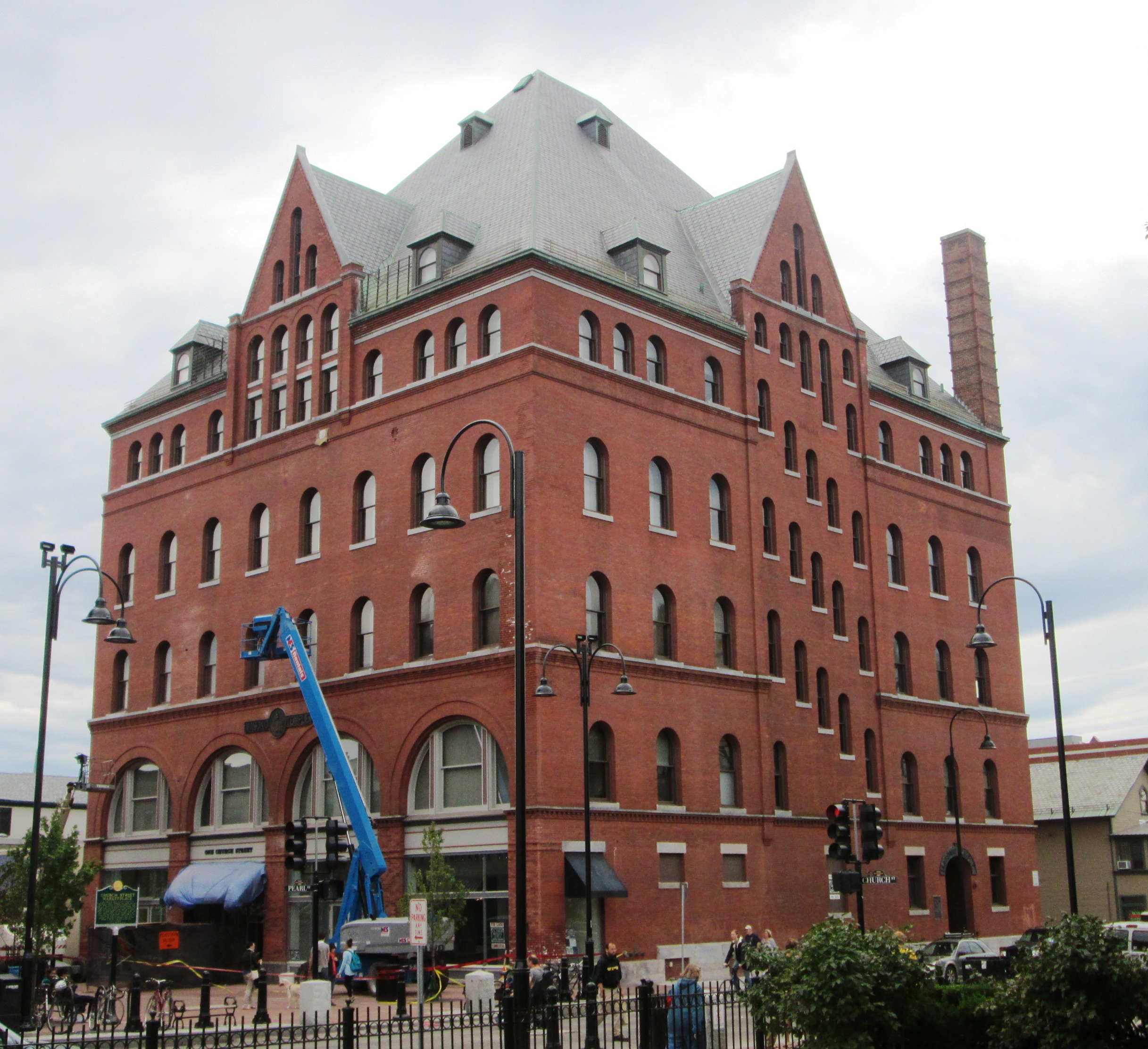
- (2013)
- Location: 1-5 Church Street at Pearl Street; Burlington, Vermont
- Built: 1897-98
- Architect: John McArthur Harris of Wilson Brothers
- Architectural style: Richardson Romanesque
- Part of: Head of Church Street Historic District (ID74000207)
- Designated CP: July 15, 1974

The former Masonic Temple at 1-5 Church Street at Pearl Street in Burlington, Vermont was built in 1897-98 to be the state headquarters of the Grand Lodge of Vermont, Free and Accepted Masons. It was designed by John McArthur Harris of the noted Philadelphia firm of Wilson Bros. & Company in the Richardson Romanesque style.

The building features a steep slate pyramid roof intersected in the middle of each side by a gable. The Pearl Street side of the building is notable for the staggered windows which provide light to one of the buildings staircases. Its upper floors were used for meetings of Masonic lodges and appendant orders, while the lower floors were used for retail and office purposes.

Today it is part of the Church Street Marketplace and is used exclusively as retail space and offices. The last Masonic Lodge in Burlington was Burlington Lodge No. 100 which met at the Oddfellows Hall on North Avenue. In June, 2016, Burlington Lodge #100 consolidated with Washington Lodge #3. Washington Lodge, which was one of the Lodges that also met in this building, now meets in Williston at the Green Mountain Masonic Center.

The Masonic Temple building is one of three contributing properties in the Head of Church Street Historic District, along with the Unitarian Church and the Richardson Building. The district was added to the National Register of Historic Places on July 15, 1974.
