= Unitarian Church (Burlington, Vermont) =

Historic church in Vermont, United States

- Unitarian Universalist Meeting House (Burlington, Vermont)
- U.S. Historic district – Contributing property
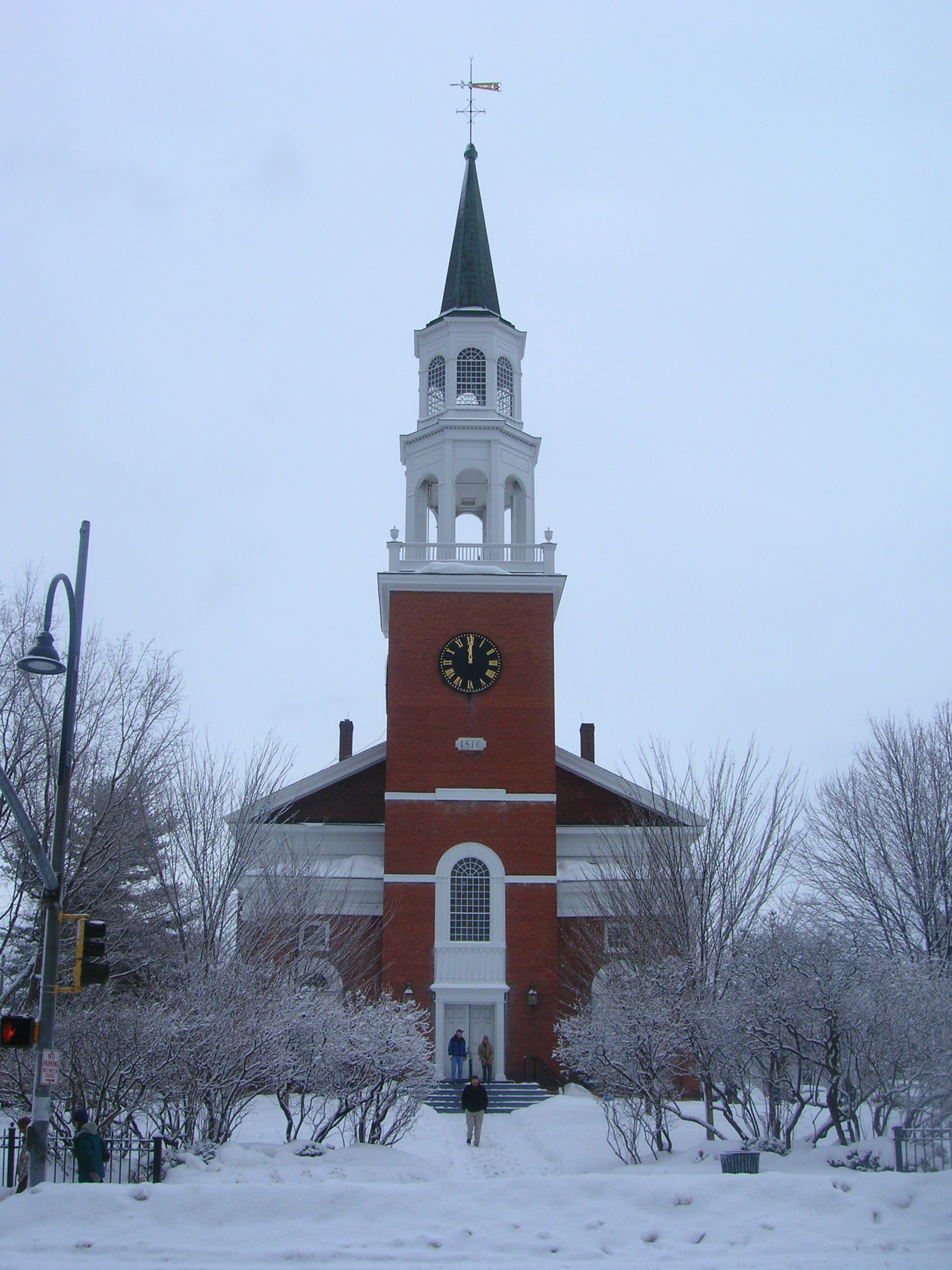
- Unitarian Universalist Meeting House at the top of Church Street

- Location within Vermont Location within the United States
- Location: 152 Pearl Street, Burlington, Vermont
- Coordinates: 44°28′51.24″N 73°12′46.1″W
- Built: 1816
- Architect: Peter Banner (with possible assistance from Charles Bulfinch)
- Architectural style: Federal
- Part of: Head of Church Street Historic District (ID74000207)
- Added to NRHP: July 15, 1974

The Unitarian Universalist Meeting House (formerly known as The Brick Meeting House) is the oldest remaining place of worship established by European settlers in Burlington, Vermont. Built in 1816, It is located along the northern side of the intersection of Pearl Street and the Church Street Marketplace.

The building is a contributing property of the Head of Church Street Historic District, in combination with the Masonic Temple (built in 1897) and the Richardson Building. The historic district was added to the National Register of Historic Places on July 15, 1974.

The Unitarian Universalist Meeting House is home to the First Unitarian Universalist Society of Burlington, Vermont, which is a member congregation of the Unitarian Universalist Association and Northern New England District.

== History ==
The Unitarian Society was originally part of the Congregational Society that was organized in Burlington, Vermont during the Federalist Era, on February 23, 1805. However, in 1810, the Congregational Society divided into the Trinitarian or Calvinistic Society, which embraced the doctrine of the Trinity, and the Unitarian Society, which rejected it. The Rev. Daniel Haskel was ordained over the Trinitarian Society on April 10, 1810, where the Rev. Samuel Clark was ordained over the Unitarian Society on April 19 of that year.

The laying of the cornerstone of the Unitarian Church occurred around May 1, 1816, with the remainder of the construction taking about seven months to complete at an approximate cost of $23,000, including the clock, bell, and organ (which was transported from Boston by sleigh). In December of that year, the pews of the lower floor were sold "for upwards of $21,000". The Unitarian Society appointed E.T. Englesby as the superintendent to officiate the completion of the building. The Burlington Northern Sentinel issue of December 27, 1816, described the church as "91 feet in length, 60 in breadth, with a steeple of 170 feet in height". The Church was dedicated on January 9, 1817.

In 1910, prompted by a letter from a historical researcher from Boston, the Burlington city treasurer L. C. Grant had discovered that the original bell for the church was cast by Paul Revere on October 13, 1816. The bell weighing 1,286 lb (583 kg), along with its tongue weighing 31 lb (14 kg) was sold to the Town of Burlington for $592.65 (at a cost of $0.45 per pound). The bell was recast in 1828 (at a cost of $166.88), and was replaced sometime in the 1900s after a crack had developed.

In August 1954, the church steeple was struck by lightning that unknowingly caused extensive deterioration over the course of the ensuing sixteen months, until it was revealed that the base had settled and tilted eastward by approximately two feet. By 1956, the decision was made to demolish the steeple, which took about six weeks to complete. Steeplejacks out of Framingham, Massachusetts managed to salvage the windows, bell, and pieces of metal sheathing during the process. A replacement spire was completed and dedicated in September 1958. The presiding pastor of the time, the Rev. Robert S. Miller, had commented that the project was financed by a $55,000 fund drive "to which people of nearly all faiths contributed".

== Gallery ==
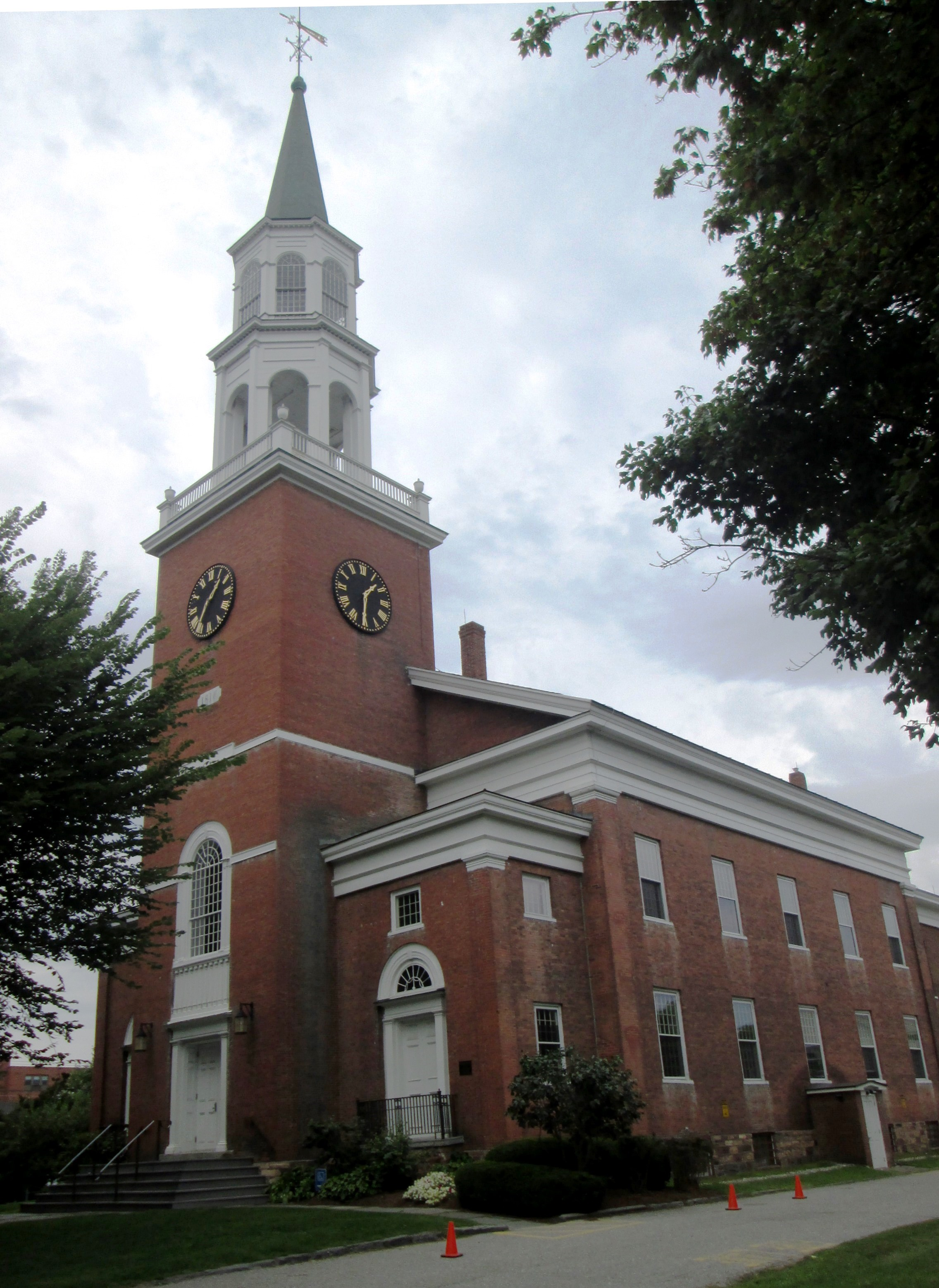
Oblique view of the Unitarian Church, 2013

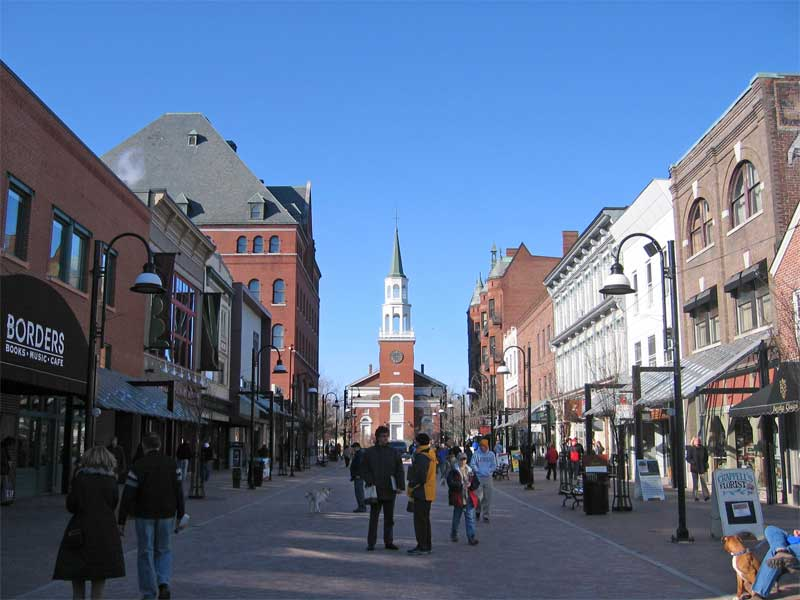
View of the church from the Church Street Marketplace, 2004

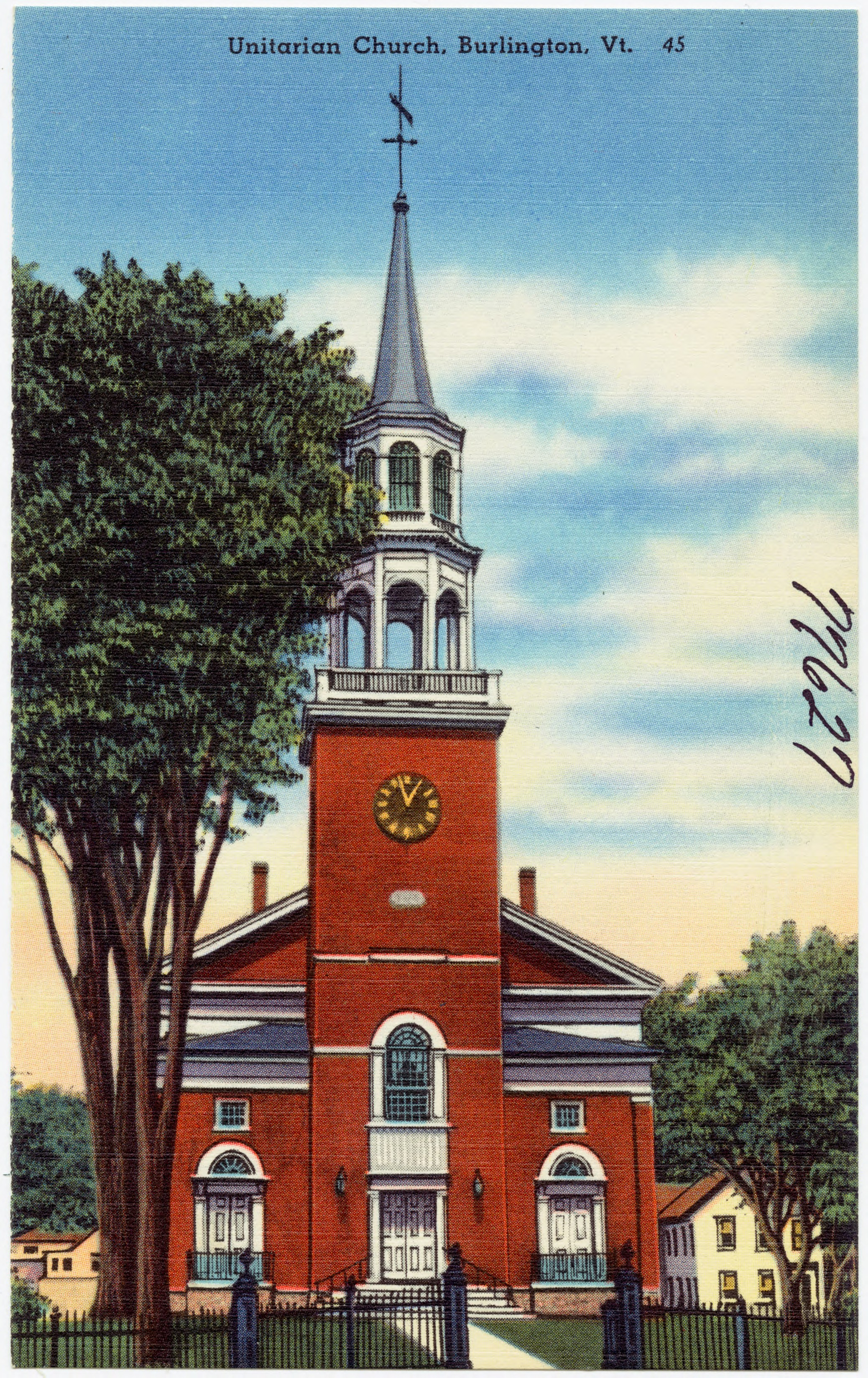
Vintage postcard of the church, circa 1930–1945

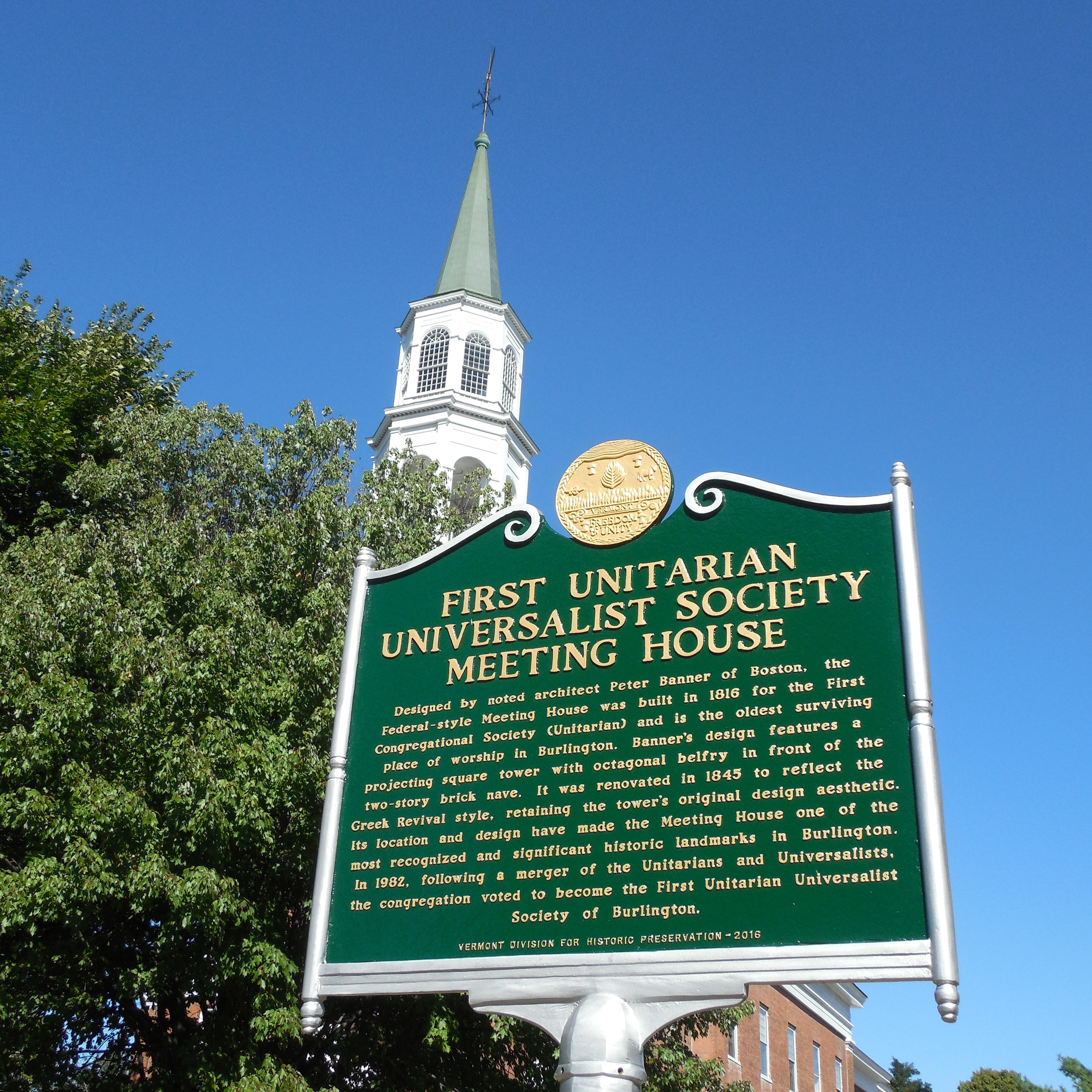
Historic wayfinding signage at the Unitarian Church
