= Old Ohavi Zedek Synagogue =

Conservative synagogue in Vermont, US

Old Ohavi Zedek Synagogue (now Ahavath Gerim Synagogue)
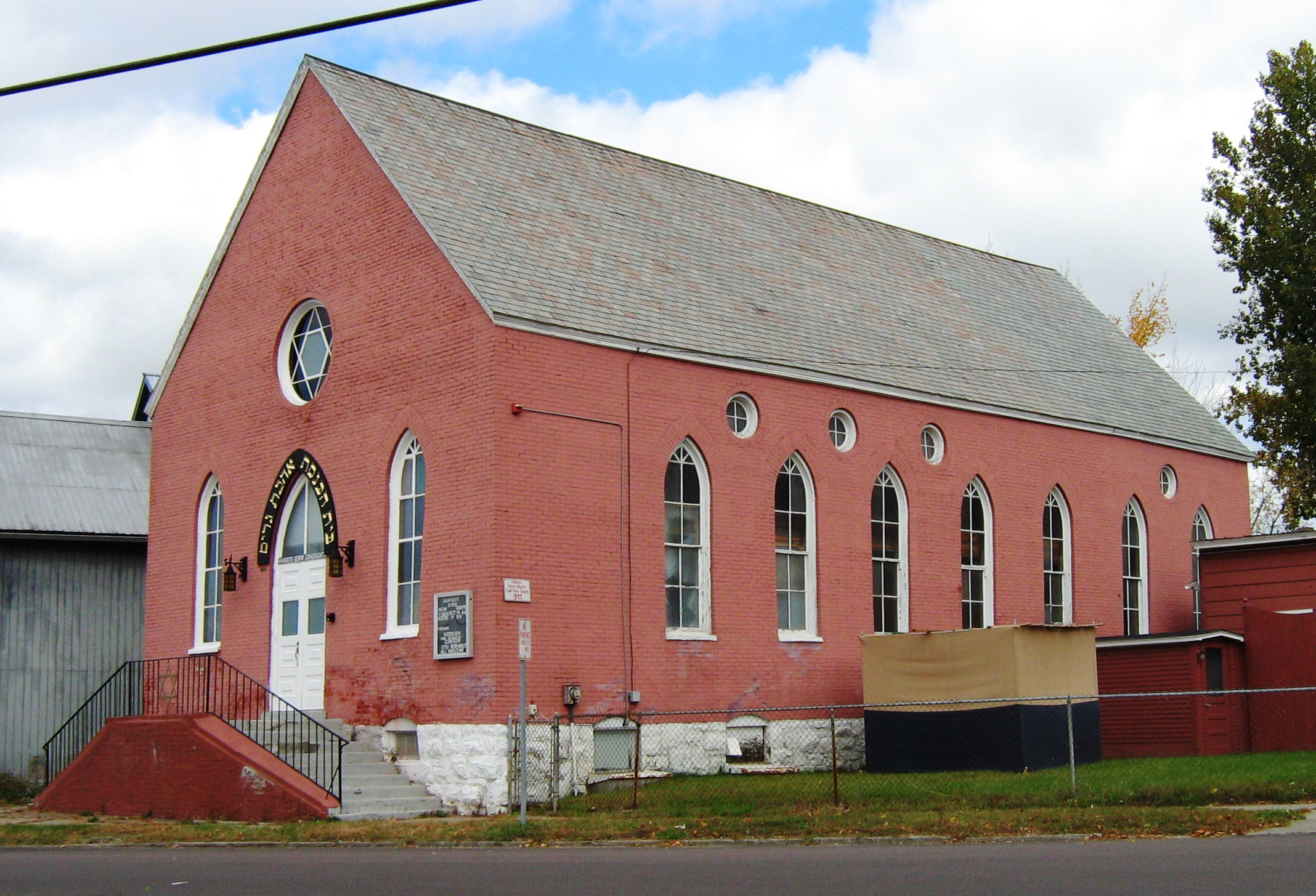
- The Old Ohavi Zedek Synagogue, now used by Congregation Ahavath Gerim

- Location in Vermont

Religion
- Affiliation: Conservative Judaism
- Ecclesiastical or organizational status: Synagogue
- Leadership: Rabbi: vacant
- Status: Decommissioned

Location
- Location: Archibald and Hyde Sts., Burlington, Vermont
- Country: United States
- Interactive map of Old Ohavi Zedek Synagogue (now Ahavath Gerim Synagogue)
- Coordinates: 44°29′18″N 73°12′26″W

Architecture
- Type: Synagogue
- Style: Gothic Revival
- Established: 1876 (as a congregation)
- Completed: 1885
- Materials: Timber; brick cladding

Website
- jcskiing.wixsite.com/ahavath-gerim
- Old Ohavi Zedek Synagogue
- U.S. National Register of Historic Places
- NRHP reference No.: 78000233
- Added to NRHP: January 31, 1978

The Old Ohavi Zedek Synagogue (Hebrew for "Lovers of Justice") is an historic synagogue building at Archibald and Hyde Streets in Burlington, Vermont, in the United States. It was built in 1885 for Ohavi Zedek, Vermont's oldest Jewish congregation, and was subsequently occupied by Congregation Ahavath Gerim. The building, a distinctive vernacular interpretation of the Gothic Revival style, was listed on the National Register of Historic Places in 1978. The building went up for sale in 2021 as the congregation faced shrinking membership and expensive repairs. It currently houses retail space.

== History ==
Founded in 1876, Ohavi Zedek is the oldest Jewish congregation in Vermont. The congregation was founded by Jewish immigrants from Eastern Europe, predominantly Lithuanian Jews. The congregation constructed this building in 1885, and in 1952 the congregation moved to its present home on North Prospect Street. This building was sold to Ahavath Gerim, a traditional egalitarian Conservative congregation. In 2023 the build was sold again to 'local entrepreneur' Kitter Spater. According to an interview with Spater by Seven Days, "He intends to turn the main sanctuary and balcony of the building into an incubator for six to eight small food vendors." As of 2026 the building houses Milk Moth: a vintage clothing and home decor store.

== Architecture ==
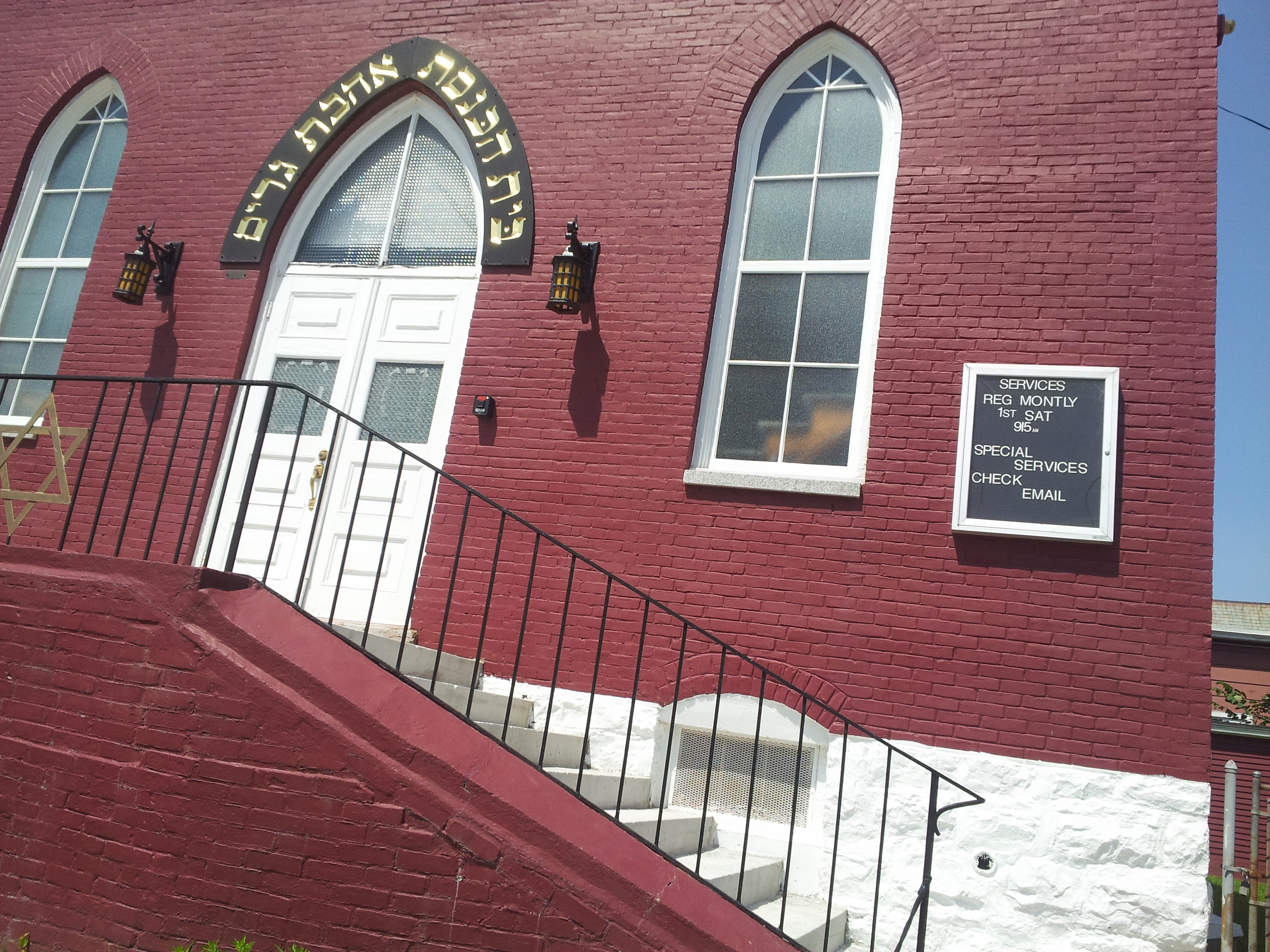
The synagogue entrance, 2014

The original Ohavi Zedek building stands at the corner of Archibald and Hyde Streets in Burlington's Old North End neighborhood. It is a rectangular brick building with a gabled roof and Gothic Revival features. The front facade has arched windows flanking an arched entry, accessed by side-facing stairs. Above the entrance is a round window with a Star of David. The building sides also have arched windows, with small oculus windows interspersed above them, which provide illumination for the women's gallery.

The building was erected in 1885, and is among the oldest synagogue buildings still standing in the United States. Originally finished in wood, it was clad in brick in 1902, when it was enlarged. It was again enlarged in 1928, at which time the present Torah ark was built. It has a Classical design, with a depiction of the Ten Commandments flanked by gilded lions and pineapple finials.

== See also ==
- Oldest synagogues in the United States
- National Register of Historic Places listings in Chittenden County, Vermont
