= Five Sisters =

Five Sisters may refer to:

- The Five Sisters (Aarhus), a silo complex in Denmark
- Five Sisters (Burlington, Vermont)
- Five Sisters of Kintail, a ridge with five summits in the Northwest Highlands of Scotland
- Five Sisters Productions, American film production company
- Five Sisters (West Calder), a group of shale bings north of the mining village in Scotland
- Five Sisters window, in York Minster, England
- Five Sisters Zoo, a zoo in West Lothian, Scotland.
- Five Sisters Park, an urban park in Warsaw, Poland
- The five Barrison Sisters, a late 19th-century vaudeville act
- Satellite Sisters, an ABC Radio program featuring five sisters
- Five American oil companies (Standard Oil of California, Standard Oil of New Jersey, Standard Oil of New York, Texaco, and Gulf Oil) which were the first to obtain oil concessions in the Middle East; see also Seven Sisters (oil companies)
