= Little Jerusalem =

Little Jerusalem can refer to:

- Little Jerusalem (Burlington, Vermont), Burlington's historic Jewish quarter
- Little Jerusalem (film), a 2005 film
- Portobello, Dublin, an area in Dublin
