= Main Street–College Street Historic District =

Historic district in Vermont, United States

- U.S. National Register of Historic Places
- U.S. Historic district
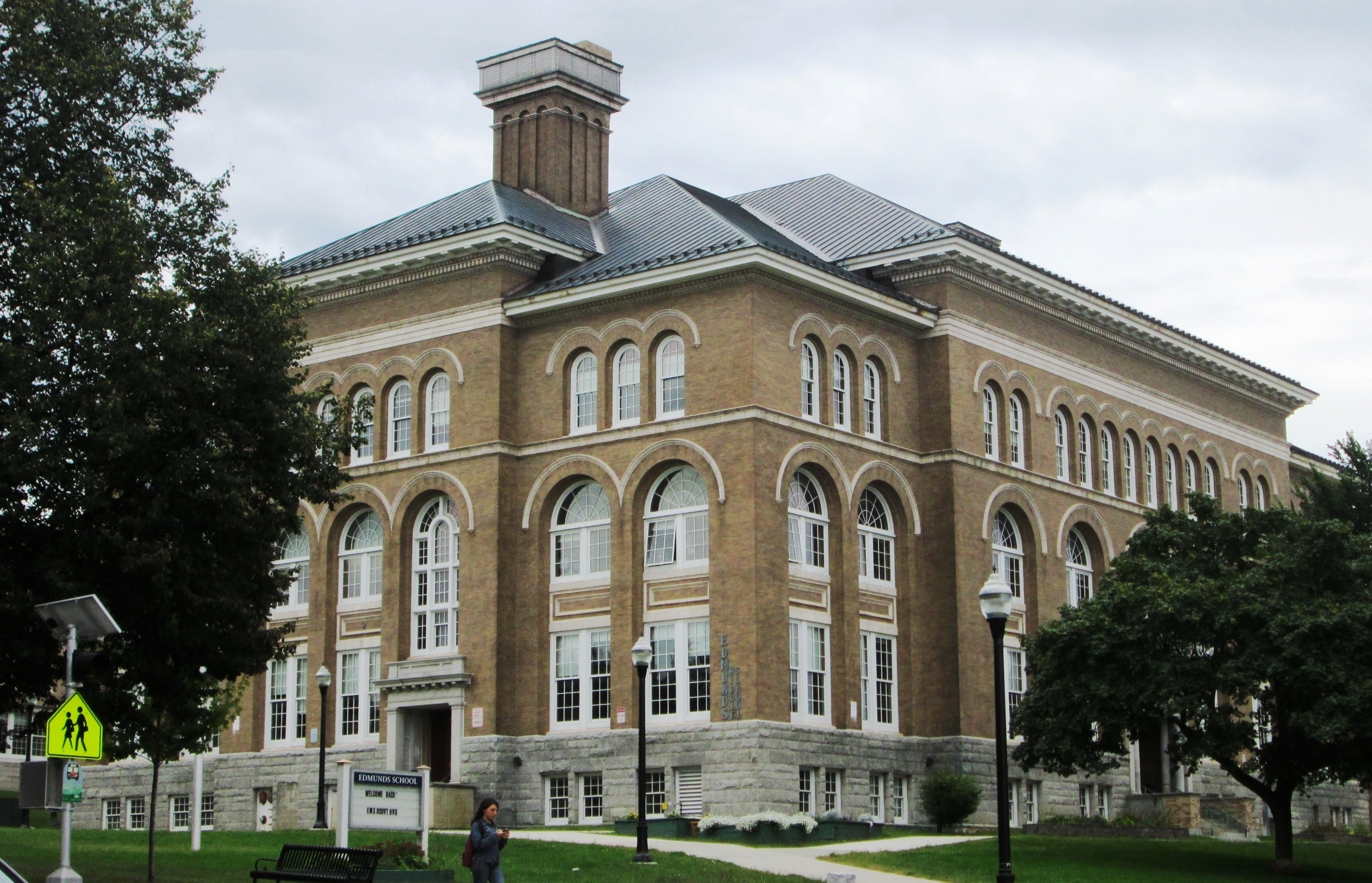
- The Edmunds School

- Location within Vermont Location within the United States
- Location: Roughly bounded by College, S. Williams and Main Sts., and S. Winooski Ave., Burlington, Vermont
- Coordinates: 44°28′44″N 73°12′22″W
- Area: 47 acres (19 ha)
- Architect: Fisher, A.B.; Et al.
- Architectural style: Mid 19th Century Revival, Late 19th And 20th Century Revivals, Late Victorian
- NRHP reference No.: 88001850
- Added to NRHP: October 13, 1988

The Main Street–College Street Historic District encompasses a historically fashionable residential area of Burlington, Vermont. Principally located along Main and College Streets between South Winooski and South Williams Streets (between downtown and the UVM campus), the area was one of the city's most exclusive residential areas from the early 19th century to the early 20th century, and includes a diversity of high quality architecture from that period. It was listed on the National Register of Historic Places in 1988.

== Description and history ==
The city of Burlington was first permanently settled in 1783, after earlier settlers had been driven from the area by raiding in the American Revolutionary War. Vermont was admitted to the United States as its 14th state in 1791 (after several decades in legal limbo), and it was in that same year that Burlington was chosen as the site of the state college, now the University of Vermont. The town's early economic activity was focused on the waterfront of Lake Champlain, with the downtown area taking shape around the courthouse square on Main Street near Church. Between the courthouse and the college campus developed into a residential area, partly due to the presence of a ravine (since filled in) that was spanned by a poor bridge. Lumber boomed as a business beginning in the 1820s, resulting in the construction of a number of fine Federal and Greek Revival Houses along Main Street, and College Street began to be developed in the 1830s. The area saw further significant development between 1880 and 1910, when a number of high style Victorian and Colonial Revival residences were built. This area also saw some commercial and civic development take place, particular the construction of what is now the Edmunds Middle School.

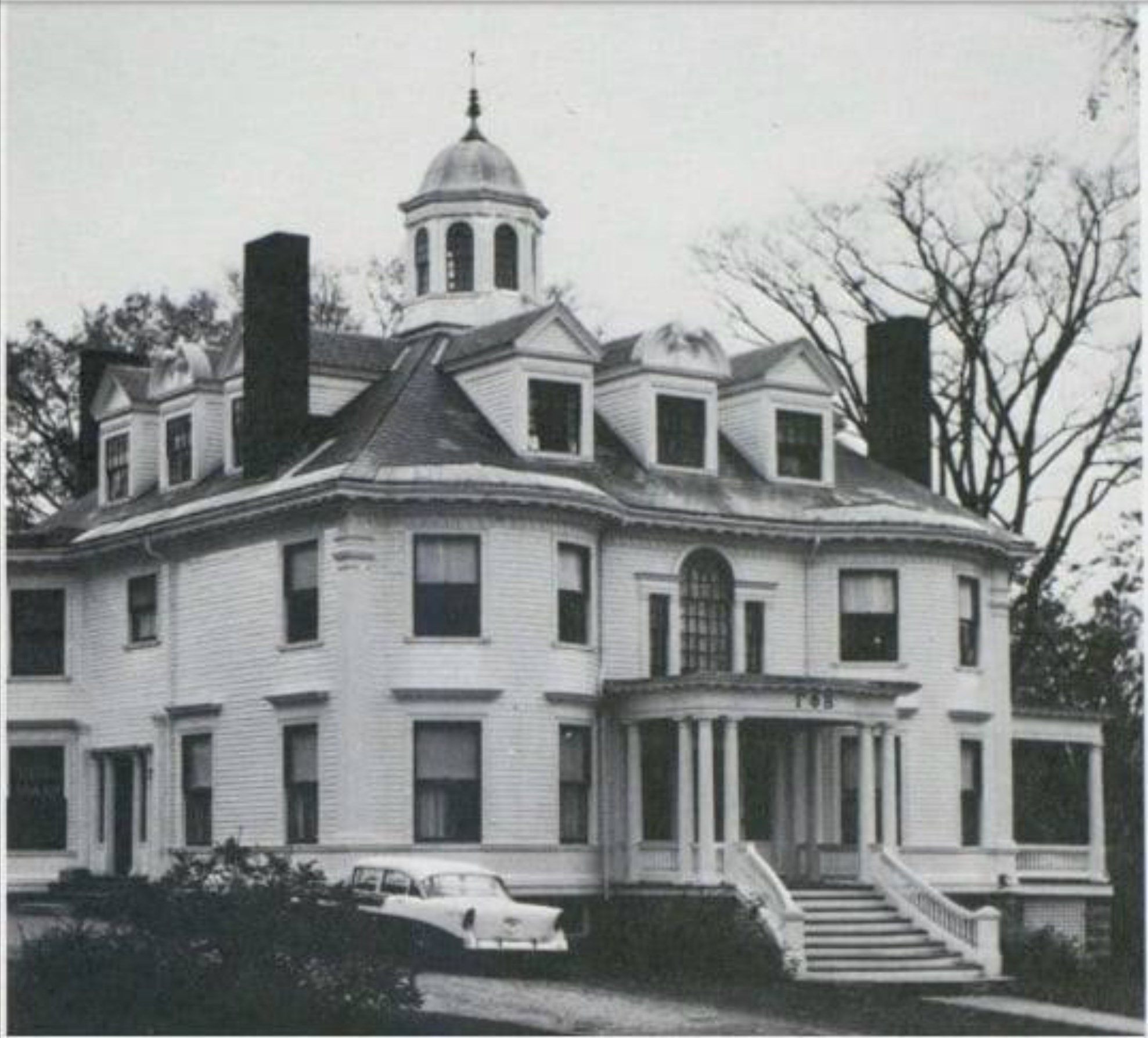
Joel Gates mansion

The historic district encompasses three blocks of Main and College Streets, from the eastern edge of South Winooski Street to the western edge of South Williams Street. It also extends along the west side of South Williams about two-thirds of the way between College and Pearl Streets. This area, about 47 acres (19 ha), includes 64 historically significant buildings. Most of these were originally single-family residences, and are finished mainly in wooden clapboards or brick. There are some multiunit apartment houses, and some of the larger mansions have been converted into apartments. One notable example is the Colonial Revival mansion of Joel Gates (381 Main Street), built in 1895 to a design by the architectural firm of Peabody & Stearns. There are two churches, both built in the 1860s, and the district is also home to the Fletcher Free Library.

== See also ==
- National Register of Historic Places listings in Chittenden County, Vermont
