= Rock Point School =

Location
- Burlington, Vermont; United States
- 44.4954°N 73.2375°W

Information
- Type: Private boarding
- Motto: "Become your best self."
- Headmaster: C.J. Spirito
- Staff: 26
- Faculty: 7
- Enrollment: 28
- Website: https://www.rockpointschool.org/

Rock Point School is a private boarding school in Burlington, Vermont. It operates as a small school designed for students who have had difficulty with education in other settings, with a nearly one-to-one ratio between students and faculty, and a tuition, room, and board (as of 2013) in excess of $53,000 per student. The school reports that 85% of graduates go to college.

The campus is located on Rock Point, a 146-acre parcel of land owned by the Episcopal Diocese of Vermont. The school was originally built in 1888 as Bishop Hopkins Hall, a finishing school for girls. It became the Rock Point School in 1928, and began admitting boys in 1972. The Hopkins Hall building, named for Bishop John Henry Hopkins, is known for an outstanding collection of stained glass windows. The school also has a small sugar house, and in 2012 completed the largest solar power installation in Burlington.

The school is a member of the Association of Independent Schools in New England (AISNE) and the Independent School Association of Northern New England (ISANNE).

== Tuition ==
Tuition for the 2023-2024 academic year is $69,900 for boarding students, and $35,185 for day students.

Tuition for the 2025-2026 academic year is $74,900 for boarding students, and $37,700 for day students.
