= File Under So. Co., Waiting for... =

American artwork in Burlington, Vermont

Coordinates: 44.455733°N 73.217131°W

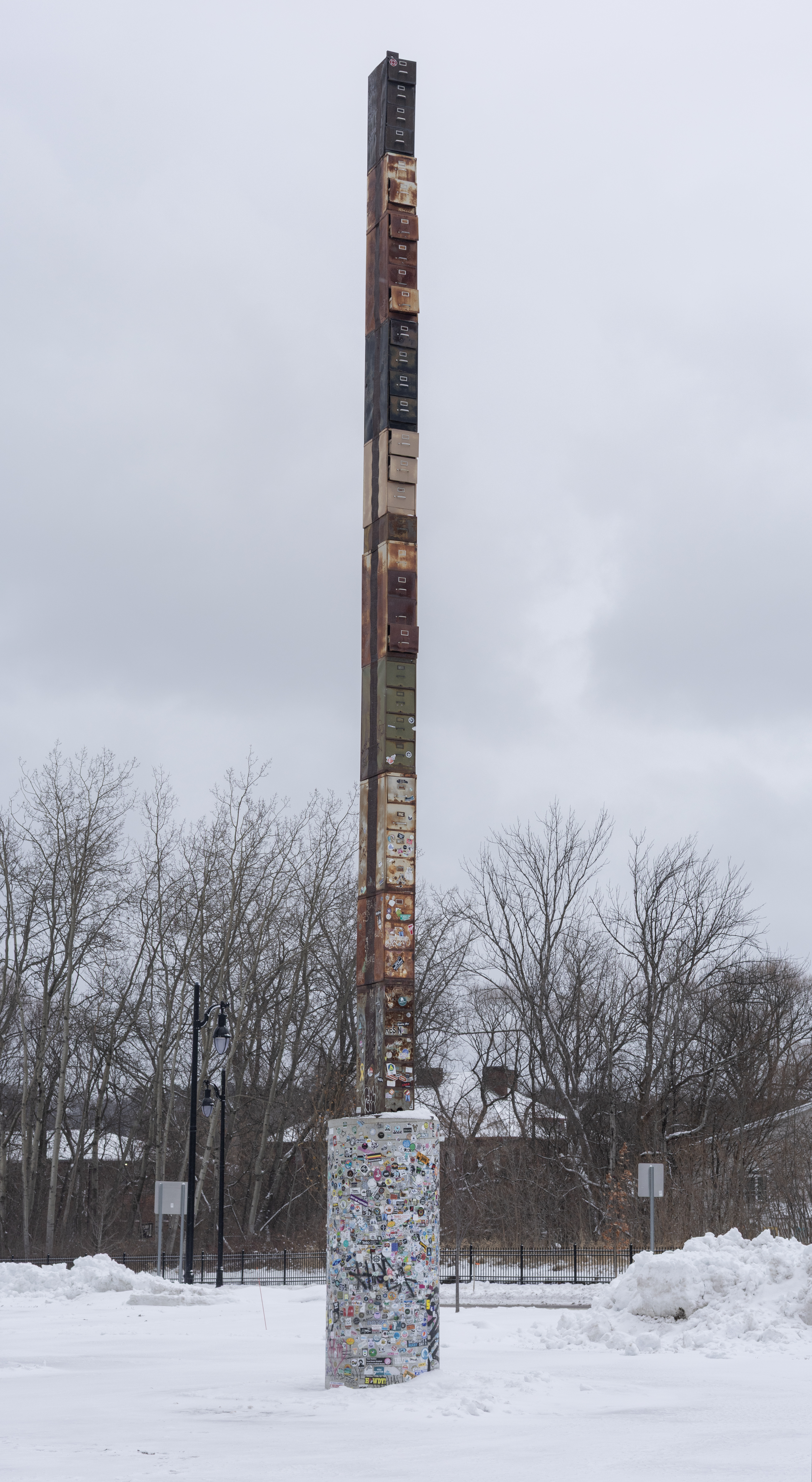
The artwork in December 2025

File Under So. Co., Waiting for... is a public art installation in Burlington, Vermont. Built in 2002 by Bren Alvarez, the concept and name symbolise the delay in building the Southern Connector ("So. Co.", a proposed northward extension of the I-189 to downtown Burlington). The filing cabinet is over 40 ft tall and was created by welding standard filing cabinets together over a year, with a steel rod inside keeping it upright. The 38 drawers in the cabinet symbolised the years since the Southern Connector was first proposed in 1965. Birds have been known to nest in the upper drawers.

== "World's tallest filing cabinet" ==
Alvarez' piece has been described as "the world's tallest filing cabinet"; however, Untitled (Minuet in MG) at Di Rosa in Napa, California, is a filing cabinet (made from a shredded 1974 MG Midget) which stands 65 feet tall.

== Relocation ==
In August 2020, due to the perceived imminence of construction in the area, it was decided to relocate the filing cabinet 100 ft from its previous position onto a new 10 ft pedestal. It is now located at 208 Flynn Avenue, Burlington.

== File Herd: On the Road to Extinction ==
In 2020, an exhibition titled "File Herd: On the Road to Extinction" was showcased during the South End Art Hop in Burlington. Transformed filing cabinets were displayed around the original pedestal of File Under So. Co., Waiting for...

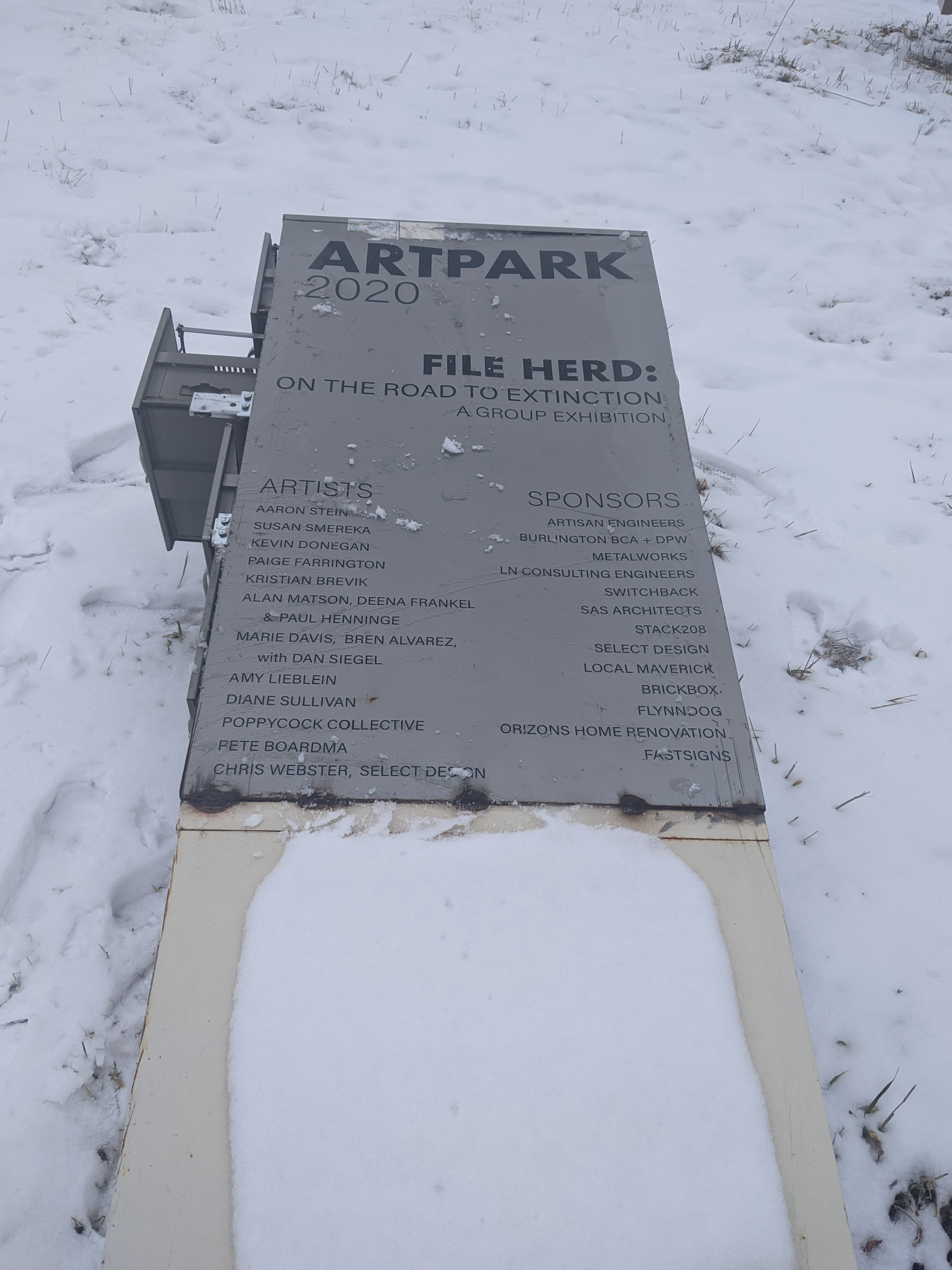
"File Herd: On the Road to Extinction" display sign

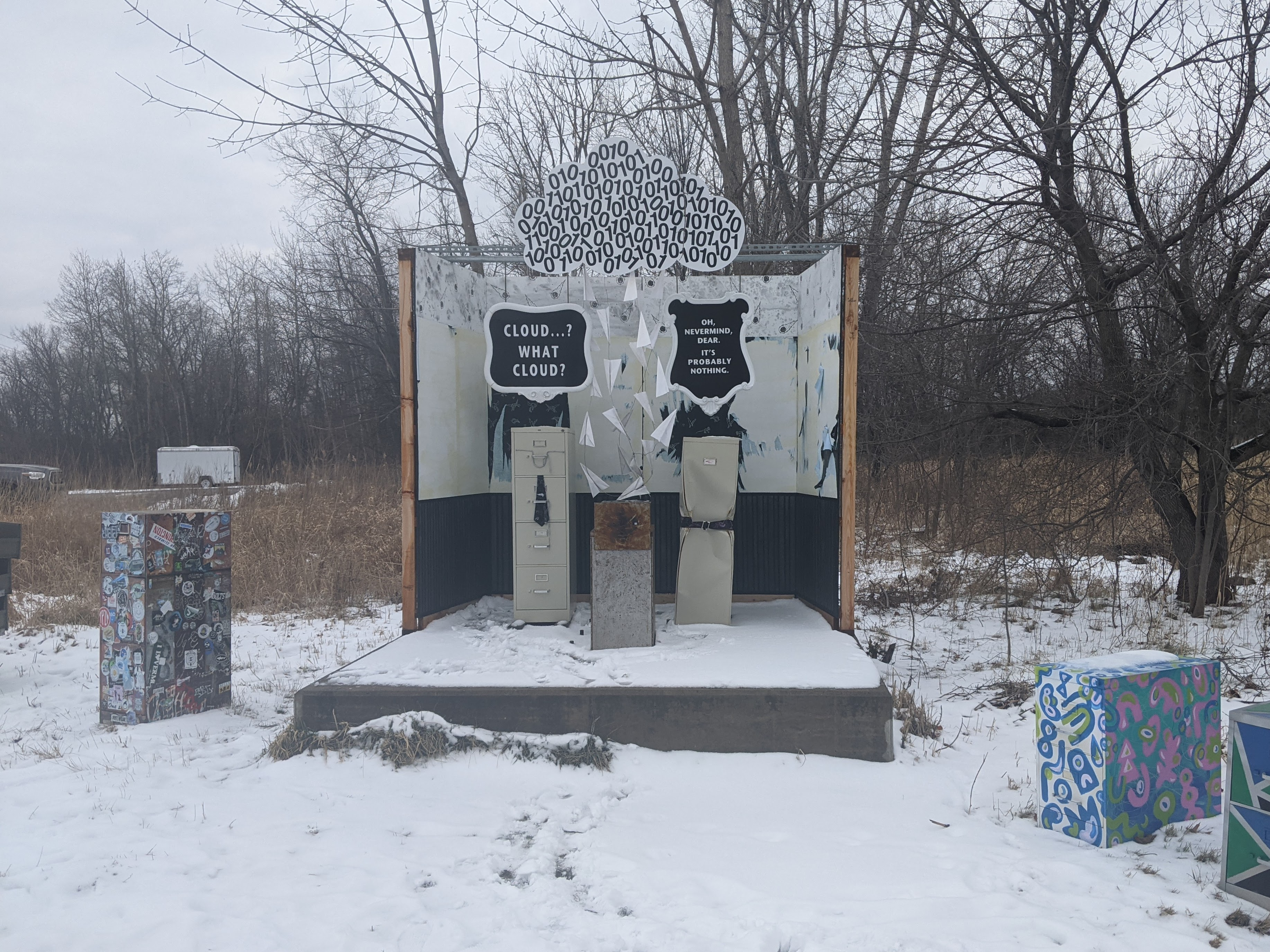
Cloud...? What Cloud? placed on the original pedestal

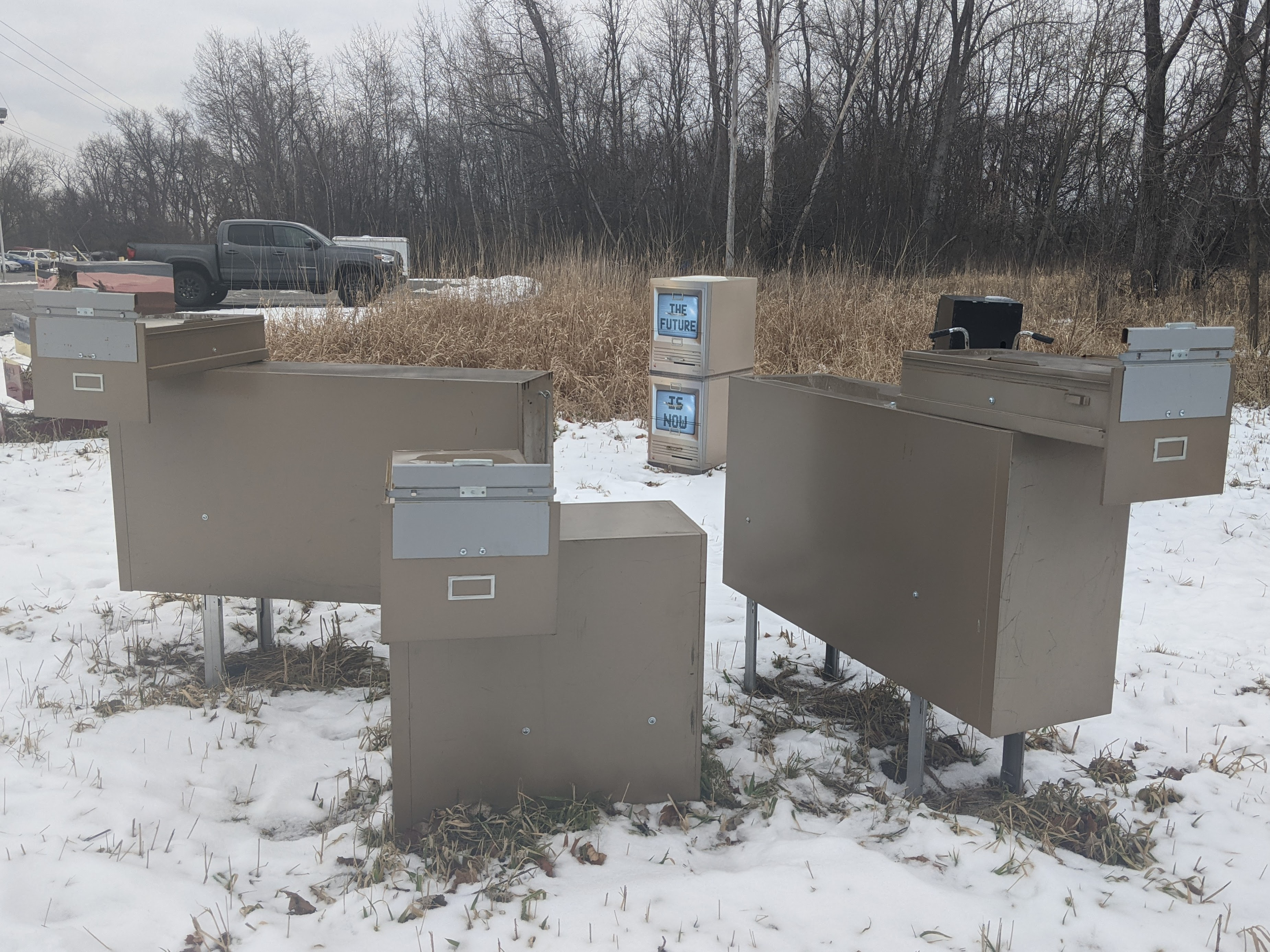
Two Cows and a Calf

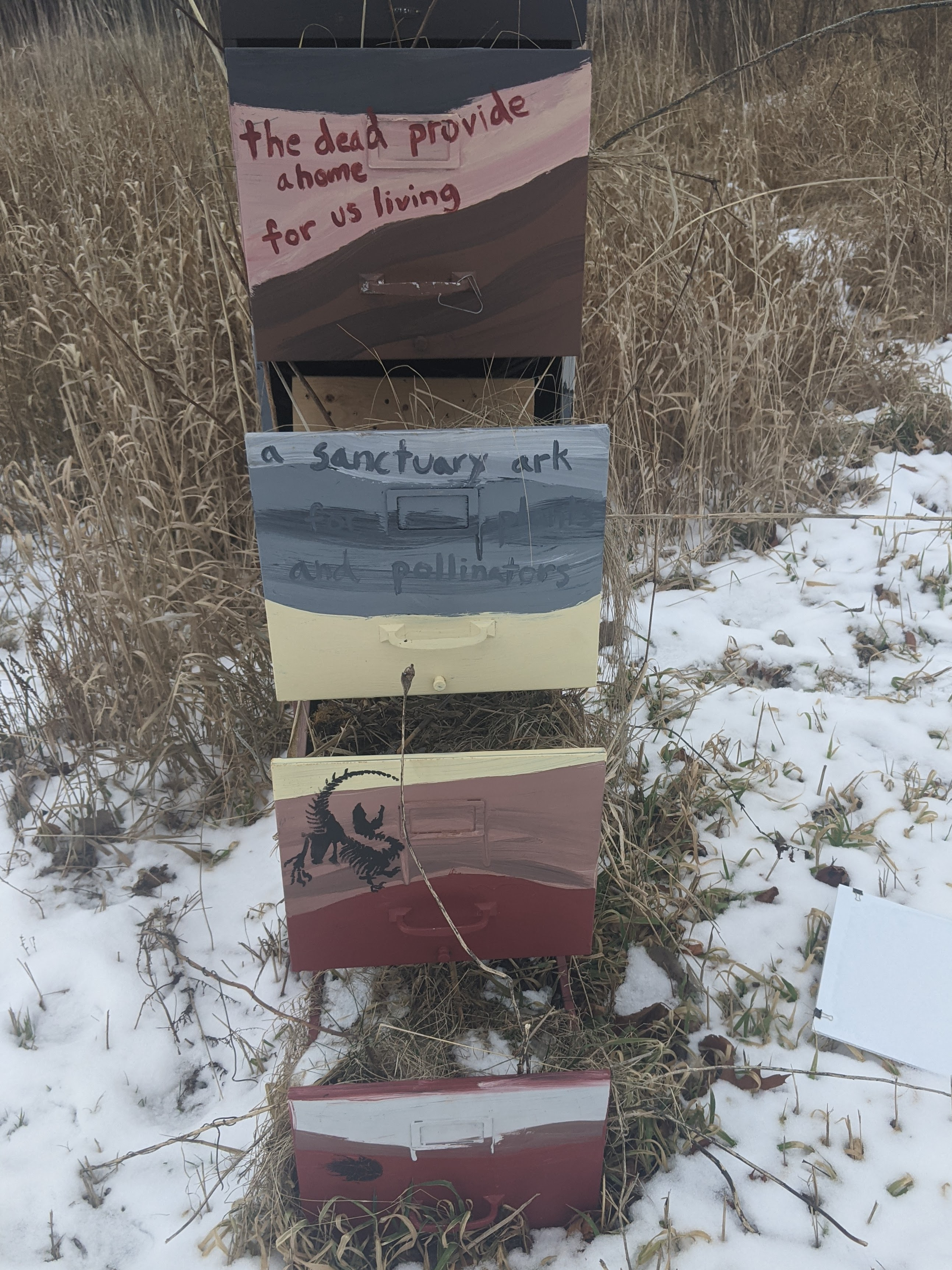
the dead provide a home for us living

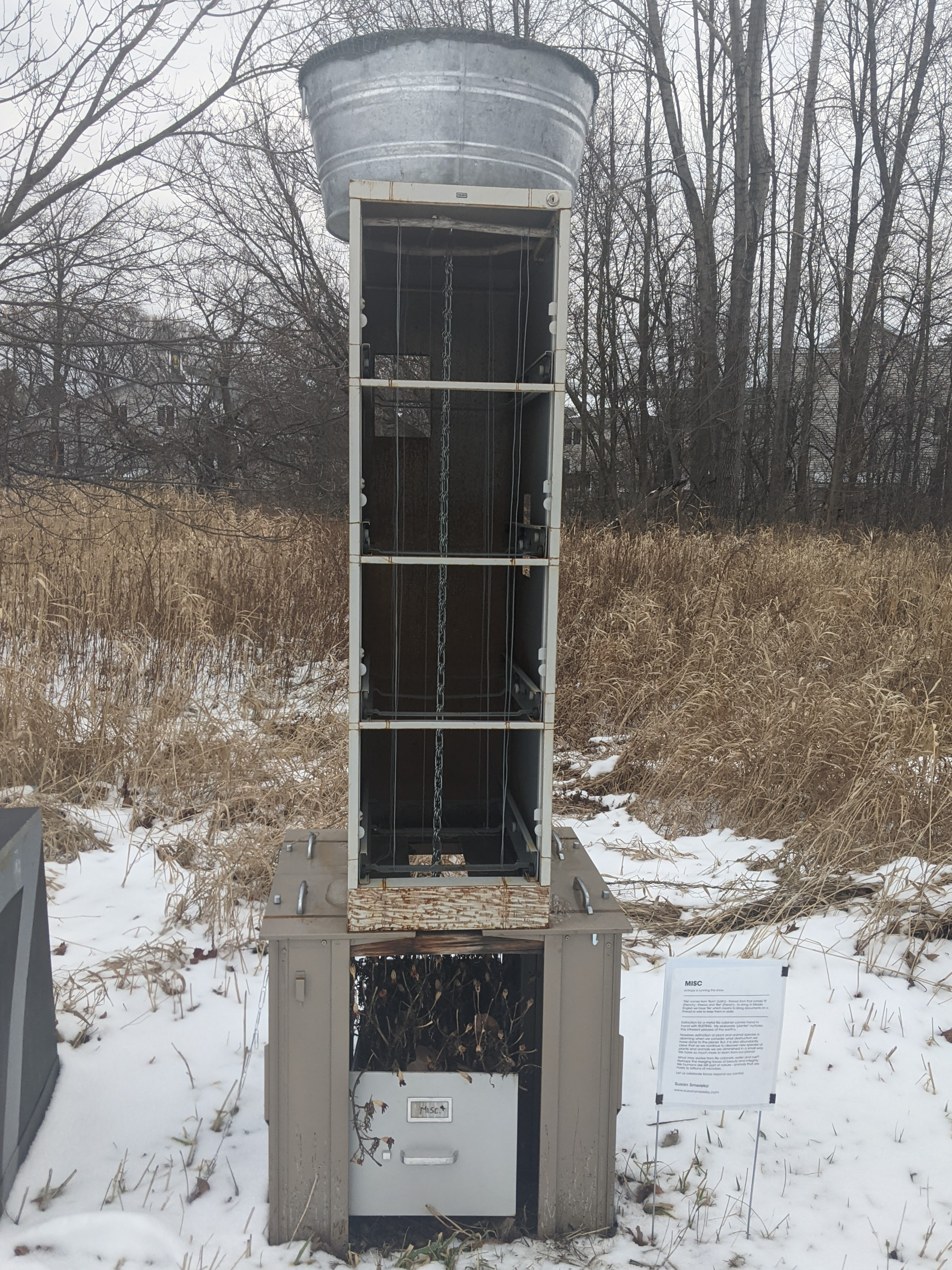
MISC: entropy is running the show
