= Mary Fletcher (philanthropist) =

American philanthropist (1830–1885)

Mary Martha Fletcher
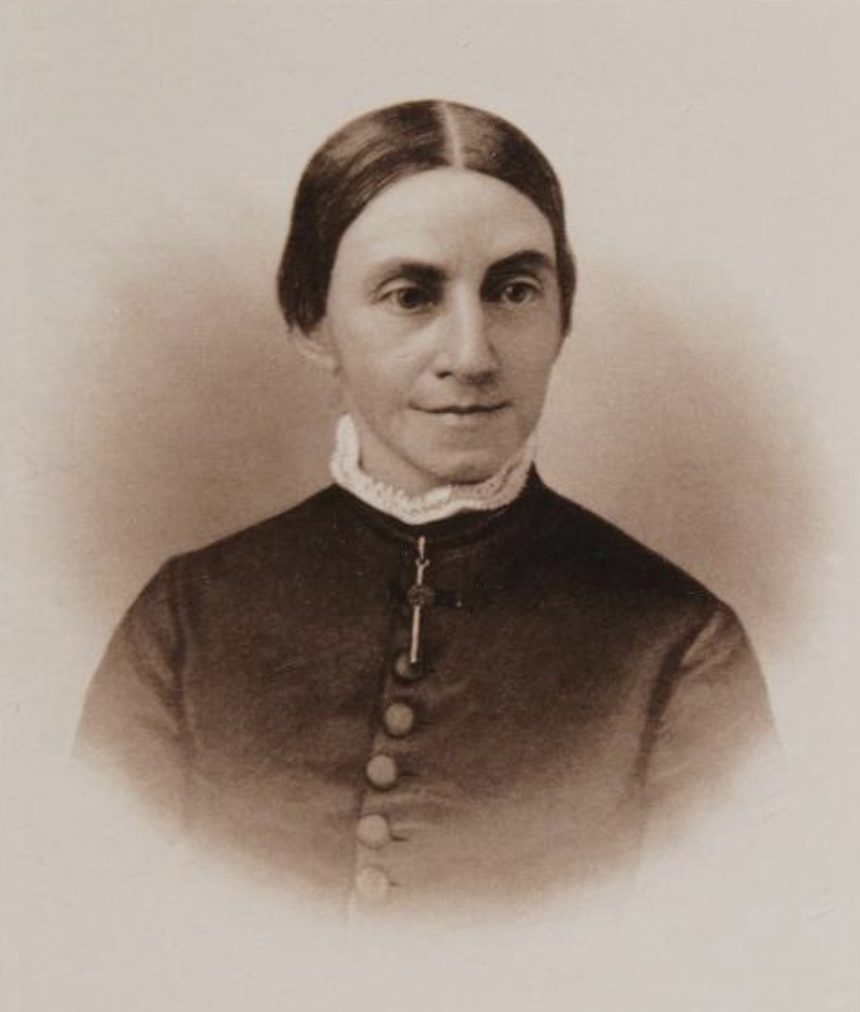
- Born: September 19, 1830; Jericho, Vermont, U.S.
- Died: February 24, 1885 (aged 54); Burlington, Vermont, U.S.
- Occupation: Philanthropist
- Known for: Founder, Mary Fletcher Hospital

Mary Martha Fletcher (September 19, 1830 – February 24, 1885) was an American philanthropist and a founder of the largest hospital in the U.S. state of Vermont, now the University of Vermont Medical Center. An invalid who suffered from tuberculosis for the majority of her lifetime, she was a member of a wealthy family who also are the namesake of the Fletcher Free Library, also located in Burlington, Vermont.

== Biography ==
Fletcher was born in Jericho, Vermont, on September 19, 1830, to Thaddeus Fletcher and Mary Laurence (Peaslee) Fletcher. Her father was a merchant, investor, and Vermont state senator. Her mother came from a prominent New Hampshire family (her brother was U.S. Congressman Charles H. Peaslee). Mary Martha was one of five siblings, two of whom lived to adulthood. Mary and her younger sister, Ellen, experienced poor health throughout their lives. In 1846, the sisters enrolled in the Burlington Female Seminary, with Mary concluding her formal education in 1847. Ellen died of consumption on September 23, 1857.

In 1876, Dr. Henry Ingersoll Bowditch diagnosed Fletcher with "a slow and lingering form of consumption," from which she had apparently suffered for twenty years. She succumbed to the disease on February 24, 1885, dying at the hospital established through her generosity. She never married or had children.

== Hospital and legacy ==
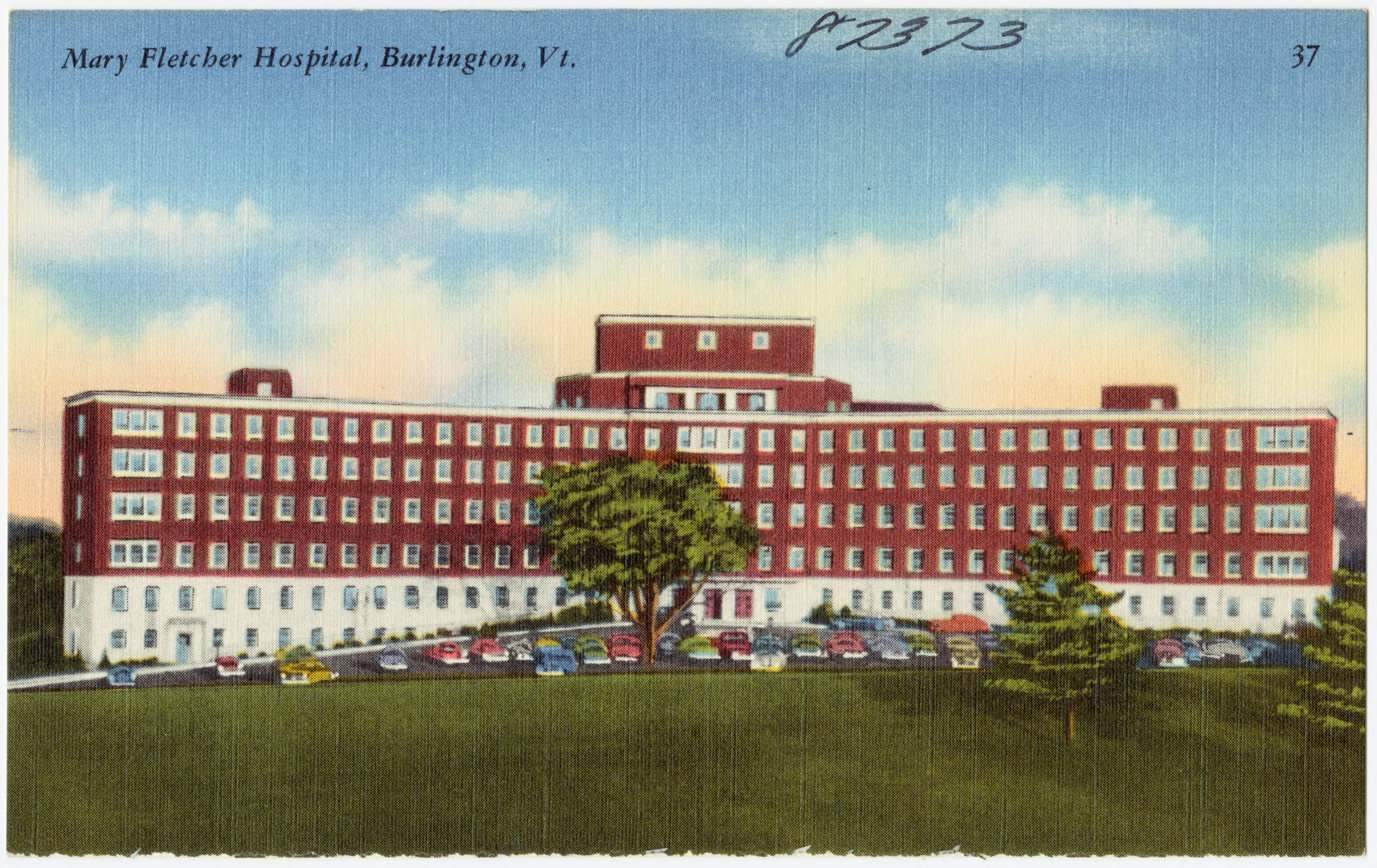
Mary Fletcher Hospital in Burlington

The University of Vermont Medical Center, originally named Mary Fletcher Hospital, traces its roots to 1876 when Fletcher announced her intention to build a hospital in Burlington. The hospital's establishment and operations were supported with a donation of $185,000 from Mary Martha Fletcher: $25,000 to purchase the land, $50,000 to construct the building, and $110,000 to establish an endowment to cover operating costs. Her gift was "the largest public beneficence ever recorded to that time in the State of Vermont." Fletcher named the hospital, which opened in 1879, after her mother, Mary L. Fletcher. It was the largest hospital in Vermont and the first public hospital in the state. In 1882, the Mary Fletcher Training School for Nurses was established there.

In addition, Fletcher endowed Burlington's Fletcher Free Library, which is named after her family. Her house and carriage house at 173 North Prospect Street has hosted the Burlington Friends Meeting since 1959. In 2007, a state roadside historical marker dedicated to Mary Martha Fletcher was placed outside her house.
