= Fletcher Free Library =

- Carnegie Building of the Fletcher Free Library
- U.S. National Register of Historic Places
- U.S. Historic district – Contributing property
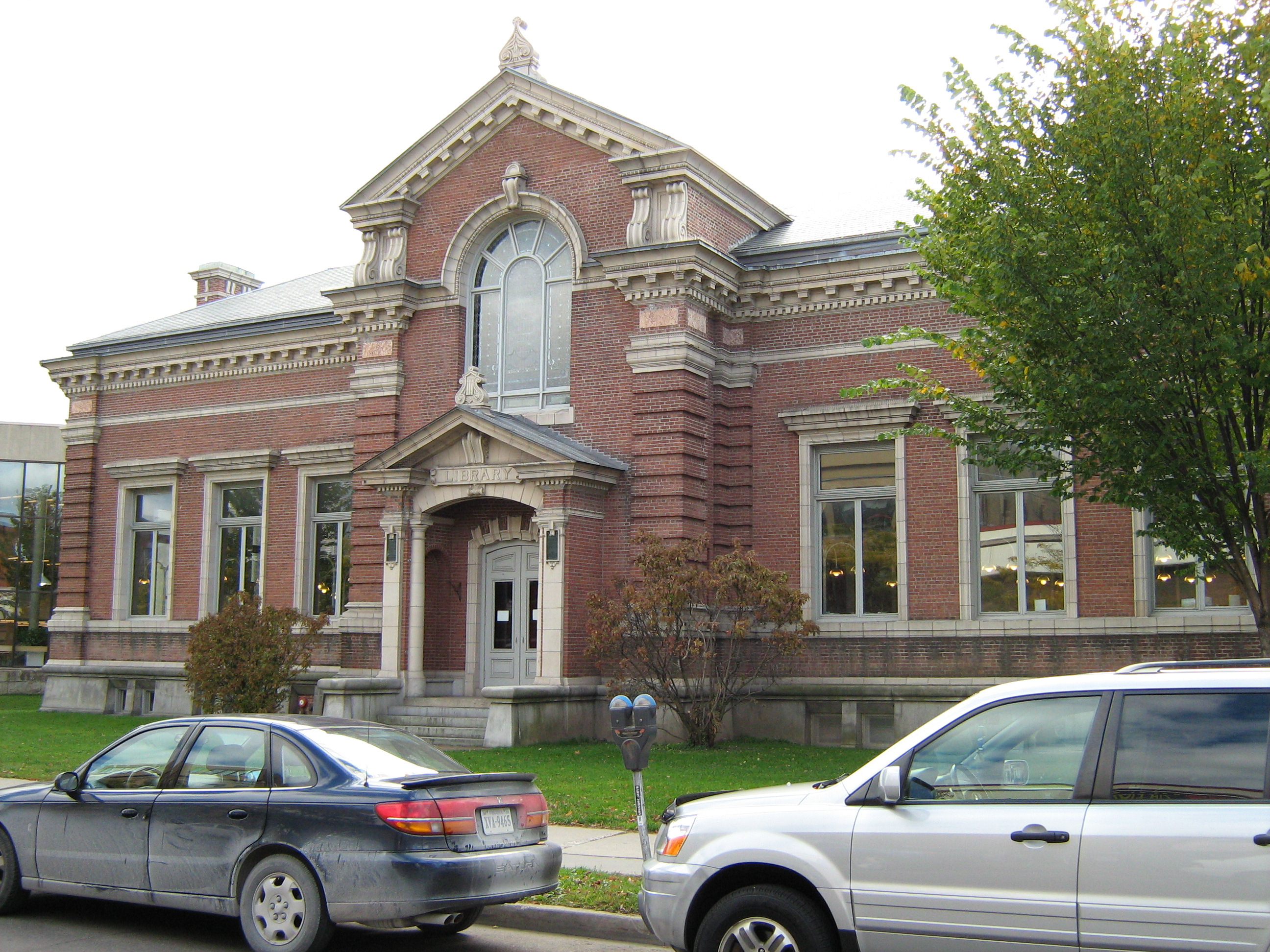

- Location within Vermont Location within the United States
- Location: 235 College St., Burlington, Vermont
- Coordinates: 44°28′37″N 73°12′39″W
- Area: less than one acre
- Built: 1904
- Architect: Willcox, Walter R. B.
- Architectural style: Beaux-Arts
- Part of: Main Street–College Street Historic District (ID88001850)
- NRHP reference No.: 76000138

Significant dates
- Added to NRHP: August 18, 1976
- Designated CP: October 13, 1988

The Fletcher Free Library is the public library serving Burlington, Vermont. It is located at 235 College Street, in an architecturally distinguished Beaux-Arts building, constructed in 1902 with funding support from Andrew Carnegie. The building was listed on the National Register of Historic Places in 1976.

== History ==
The Fletcher Free Library was established in 1873, endowed by Mary Martha Fletcher, the daughter of a local businessman. It outgrew its initial building on Church Street by 1901. A new building was constructed in 1901–04 with funds provided by industrialist and philanthropist Andrew Carnegie, making it the first of the four Carnegie libraries in the state of Vermont. It was designed in the Beaux-Arts style by Walter R. B. Willcox of Burlington, who won a competition to receive the commission.

The building had major settling problems in 1973 where it had been built over a filled-in ravine, and the library's collection was moved elsewhere. The possible razing of the building was stopped by a citizens' committee, which successfully had it added to the National Register of Historic Places, and a grant allowed the stabilization and repair of the building. A new modern addition was completed in 1981.

The largest public library in Vermont, the Fletcher Free Library had a budget of over $3 million in 2022. It circulated more books, had more visitors, and had more computers, than any other library in the state. In addition to its primary services as Burlington's public library, it is also a community center, a cultural resource for newly arrived immigrants to the Burlington area, and the city's only free public access computer center.

== Architecture ==
The library is located just east of downtown Burlington, at the southeast corner of College Street and South Winooski Avenue. The Carnegie building is a tall single-story structure, built of brick with terra cotta trim and resting on a granite foundation. Its central bay projects, providing the building's original entrance beneath a gabled roof, while a larger hip-roof section projects to the rear. It has rusticated brick corner pilasters and an elaborately detailed Corinthian cornice. To the left, the modern three-story addition is attached to the rear left of the original building, and now provides the main entrance via a walkway between the two sections.

== See also ==
- National Register of Historic Places listings in Chittenden County, Vermont
- List of Carnegie libraries in Vermont
