= Flag of Burlington, Vermont =

City of Burlington
- Proportion: 2:3
- Adopted: November 27, 2017
- Design: Five horizontal, zig-zag stripes of blue, white, green, white, and blue.
- Designed by: Owen and Lucas Marchessault

The flag of Burlington, Vermont, was adopted by the Burlington city council on November 27, 2017, during the mayorship of Miro Weinberger. It is five horizontal, zig-zag stripes of blue, white, green, white, and blue.

== History ==
=== 1990 flag ===
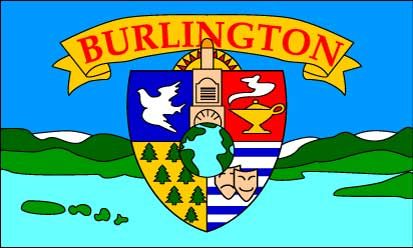
Flag of Burlington, Vermont (1990–2017)

In 1990, a group of students at Edmunds Middle School, led by eighth grader Cara Wick, designed a 2:3 proportioned flag for Burlington as part of a leadership project. The background of the flag depicts the westward view from the city over Lake Champlain of the Adirondack Mountains in New York and the Four Brother Islands, including Juniper Island. There is a yellow scroll across the top reading "BURLINGTON," below which sits a quartered shield. The first quarter, blue with a white dove, symbolizes peace and the city's sister cities. (Note: Arad, Israel, Bethlehem, Palestine, Honfleur, France, Moss Point, Mississippi, Nishinomiya, Japan, Puerto Cabezas, Nicaragua, and Yaroslavl, Russia) The second quarter, red with a yellow genie lamp, represents the colleges and universities in Burlington, namely University of Vermont, Champlain College, Burlington College, and Trinity College of Vermont. The third quarter, yellow with several pine trees, represents environmental conservation; pine trees were chosen because it is "the state tree of Vermont," but the state tree is actually the sugar maple. The fourth quarter, blue and white with comedy and tragedy masks, represents the arts." The globe in the center of the shield represents the theme "we are one world;" atop the globe, separating the first and second quarter of the shield, is city hall. The reverse of the flag is a mirror image, except the name "BURLINGTON" is lettered correctly.

The North American Vexillological Association ranked the 1990 flag of Burlington as one of the worst city flags in the United States in a 2004 survey. The flag came in at 107 out of 150 cities, earning a 3.23 out of 10. Of the Association's five principles of good flag design, the 1990 flag breaks most, if not all of them. (Note: Keep it simple; use meaningful symbolism; use 2 or 3 basic colors; no lettering or seals; be distinctive or be related)

=== 2017 flag ===
Inspired by Roman Mars' viral 2015 TEDTalk on flag design, Mayor Weinberger announced in January 2017 the city would be changing its flag to better represent the community. This came after the nearby city of Montpelier, Vermont, updated their flag in 2015 after Mars said of the flag, among others, "there is a scourge of bad flags and they must be stopped." Burlington City Arts, the city's art commission, decided they would hold a public contest to design the new flag. Residents had six weeks to submit their designs beginning September 1; 138 submissions were received. Those 138 were narrowed down to seven by a local committee of designers, students, teachers, and Ted Kaye, secretary of the North American Vexillological Association. The process then opened up to the public, who had one month to vote online; voters ranked each flag on a scale of one to ten and the design with the highest average score would become the new flag. 1,427 residents of Burlington voted and the winning design was the one created by seventh graders and twin brothers Owen and Lucas Marchessault and with help from their mother Molly Abair. The new flag was officially adopted by the city council on November 27, and first raised on New Year's Eve 2017 as a part of Burlington's First Night celebrations.

== Symbolism ==
According to the Marchessault twins, the top blue line symbolizes the sky, Burlington's history, and hope for the future. The top white line represents the snow-covered mountains. The green line is in reference to Vermont's nickname, "the Green Mountain State", as well as the city's commitment to environmental protection and education. The bottom white line represents Burlington Harbor's breakwater, on which the Burlington Breakwater Lights are located, while the bottom blue line symbolizes Lake Champlain, upon which the city is located.
