= Five Sisters Park =

Urban park in Warsaw, Poland

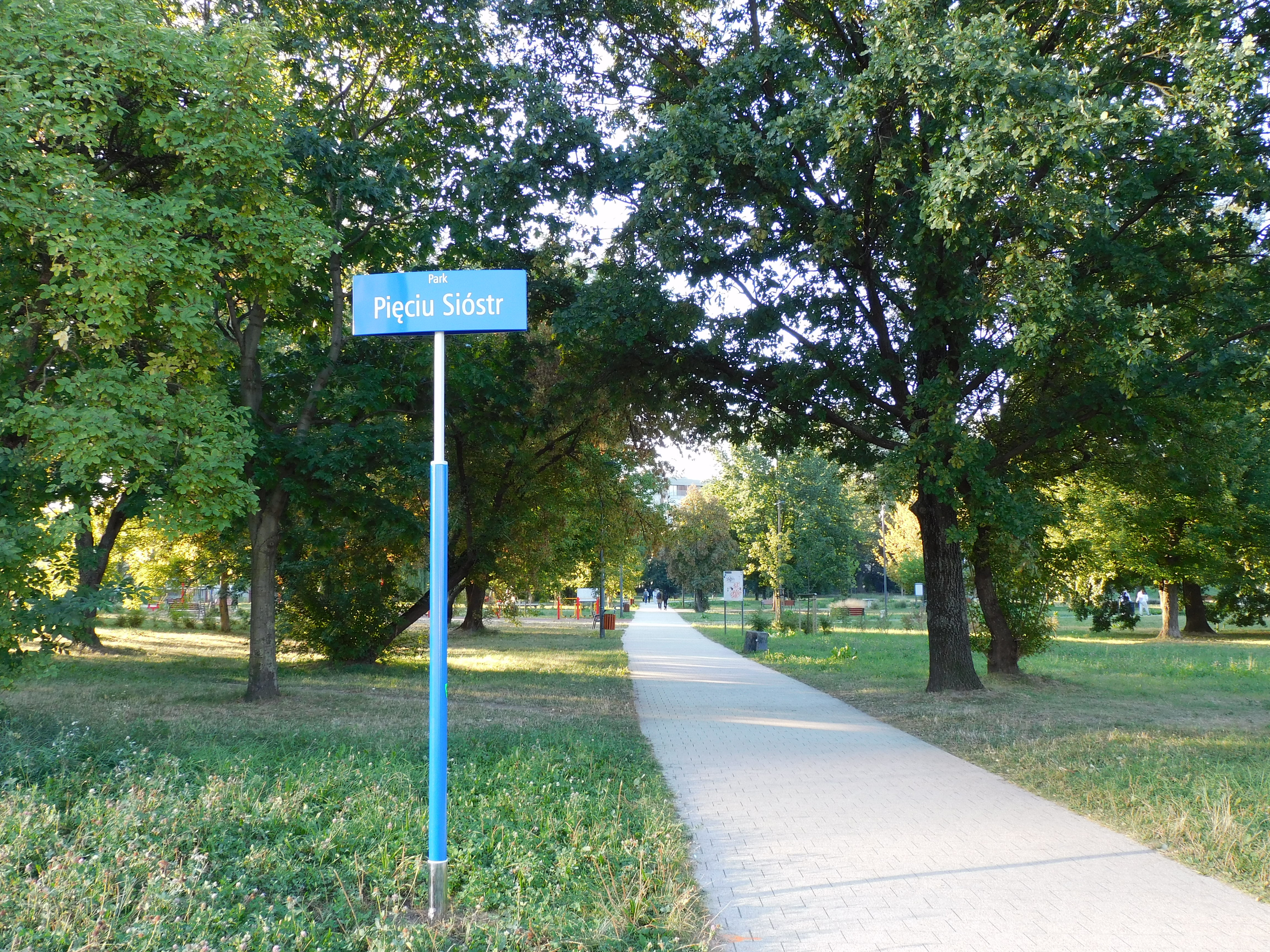
- The Five Sisters Park in 2022.
- Interactive map of Five Sisters Park
- Type: Urban park
- Location: Ochota, Warsaw, Poland
- Coordinates: 52°13′00″N 20°58′00″E
- Area: c. 8 ha
- Created: 21 October 2020

The Five Sisters Park, (Note: Polish: Park Pięciu Sióstr) also known as the Western Park, (Note: Polish: Park Zachodni) is an urban park in Warsaw, Poland, located in the district of Ochota, at the intersection of Jerusalem Avenue and Bitwy Warszawskiej 1920 roku Street. It was opened in 2020.

== Name ==
The Five Sisters Park (Polish: Park Pięciu Sióstr) was named after Wanda Posselt and her sisters Zofia, Janina, Jadwiga, and Irena, who in 1908 founded an all-girls school at Białobrzeska Street in Warsaw that operated until 1948.

Originally, it was named the Western Park (Polish: Park Zachodni), with the name originating from a public plebiscite. However the Ochota District Council postulated for the name Five Sisters Park instead, and later, as a compromise, the Five Sisters Western Park (Polish: Park Zachodni im. Pięciu Sióstr). In 2022 the Warsaw City Council had officially changed the name to the Five Sisters Park, with the official ceremony taking place on 23 August. During it, five oak trees were also given names commemorating the titular women. Despite that the park stills continues to be known colloquially by its former name.

== History ==
The park was proposed in 2015, and its construction, with breaks, lasted from 2017 to 2020. It was officially opened on 21 October 2020. The park was built in place of the allotments.

Currently, it is planned to construct a tramway tunnel underneath the park, from Bitwy Warszawskiej 1920 roku Street to the Warsaw West railway station. The works are scheduled to take place from 2024 to 2026.

== Characteristics ==
The park is located in the neighbourhood of Old Ochota, within the district of Ochota, at the intersection of Jerusalem Avenue and Bitwy Warszawskiej 1920 roku Street. It has the total area of around 8 ha.
