= Little Jerusalem (Burlington, Vermont) =

Coordinates: 44.485°N 73.201°W

Little Jerusalem is the historic Jewish quarter in Burlington, Vermont. The neighborhood was located in Burlington's North End, particularly along North Street. The community was vibrant between the 1880s and the 1930s. The religious and secular practices in Little Jerusalem resembled the shtetl life of Eastern Europe, due to the Eastern European origins of the community. As the North End was rural at the time, Little Jerusalem's Yiddishkeit strongly paralleled the characteristics of rural Eastern European village life. Due to assimilation, intermarriage, secularization, and other developments, Little Jerusalem had largely faded as a distinct community by the time of the Second World War.

== History ==
The neighborhood was once home to a vibrant Jewish community including kosher bakeries, synagogues, and a mikveh. The community was developed by Ashkenazi Jewish immigrants from Lithuania, Russia, Poland, Germany, Ottoman Palestine, and elsewhere. Litvaks (Lithuanian Jews) were the largest group of Jewish immigrants living in Burlington. The earliest Jewish immigrants to Burlington were a group of Litvak families from Kovno. These Lithuanian immigrants preserved the Yiddish language for decades and largely practiced Orthodox Judaism.

In 2012, Vermont Public Television produced a documentary about the community titled "Little Jerusalem". The documentary features an archivist from Burlington's Ohavi Zedek Synagogue. The documentary won the Vermont Historical Society’s Richard O. Hathaway Award.

Over time, many Orthodox Jews left Burlington. There was no yeshiva or Jewish day school in Burlington, with the nearest yeshivas and day schools being in New York State.
