= Five Sisters (Burlington, Vermont) =

Neighborhood in Burlington, Vermont

Coordinates: 44.465381°N 73.210616°W

Five Sisters is a historic neighborhood in the South End of Burlington, Vermont. There are approximately 300 homes on the neighborhood's five streets which were completed in the late 19th and early 20th century. According to local legend, these streets were named after the developer's five daughters, though some local historians can neither confirm nor deny such rumors. The Five Sisters neighborhood, located in Burlington’s South End, was developed between 1910 and the 1950s on former estate land. The development occurred in three phases north to south. In 1910-1911, developers Roland D. Batchelder and Frank H. Brown purchased the former Buell Estate and subdivided the land into uniform, rectangular lots on Hayward, Caroline, Charlotte, Catherine, and St. Paul streets. Between 1926 and 1932, developer Paul D. Kelley developed plans for Ledgemere, Marian, and Margaret streets and southern extensions of Caroline and Charlotte streets. The neighborhood’s name references Caroline, Charlotte, and Katherine (Catherine), three daughters of Edward and Maria (Buell) Hungerford, and Margaret and Marian, developer Paul Kelley’s wife and niece, respectively. The origins of the local nickname “New Harlem” is unknown.

In 2006, the Five Sisters neighborhood was named to the "top ten" neighborhoods in the United States by Cottage Living magazine.

== The Five Sisters ==
- Caroline St.
- Catherine St.
- Charlotte St.
- Margaret St.
- Marion St.

== Sources ==
- Seven-Days article on the Five Sisters
- Cottage Living magazine
