= Burlington, Vermont =

Most populous city in Vermont, U.S.

Burlington
- City
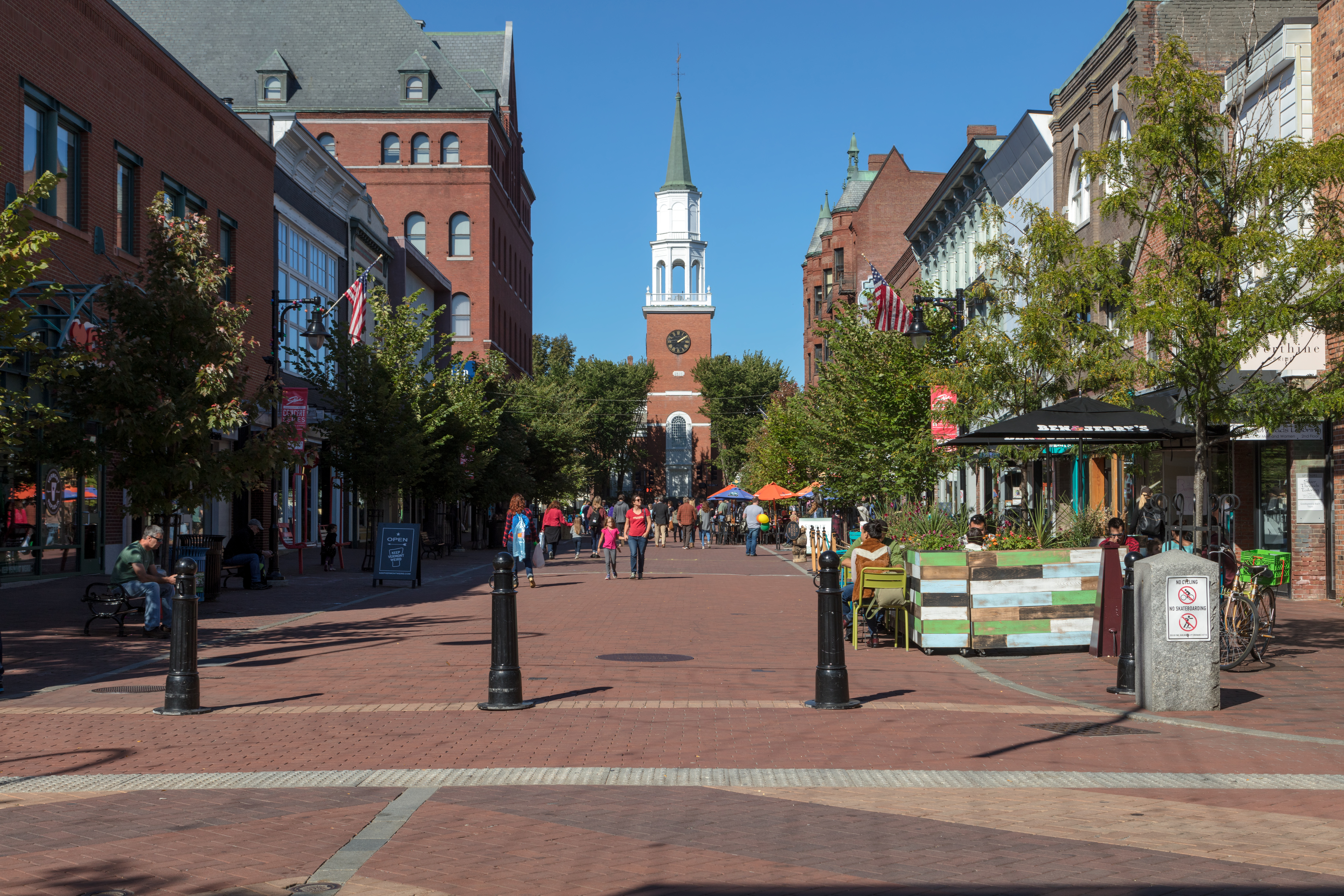
- Church Street Marketplace in 2017

- Flag Seal
- Nicknames: BTV, The Queen City; Burly
- Interactive map of Burlington
- Coordinates: 44°28′34″N 73°12′47″W
- Country: United States
- State: Vermont
- County: Chittenden
- Region: New England
- Settled: 1783
- Organized (town): 1785
- Incorporated (city): 1865

Government
  - Mayor: Emma Mulvaney-Stanak (P)
  - City Council: Members: Carter Neubieser (P); Eugene Bergman (P); Joe Kane (P); Sarah E. Carpenter (D); Ben Traverse (D); Becca Brown McKnight (D); Evan Litwin (D); Marek Broderick (P); Melo Grant (P); Allie Schachter (D); Mark Barlow (D); Ranjit "Buddy" Singh (D)

Area
  - City: 15.49 sq mi (40.13 km^{2})
  - Land: 10.31 sq mi (26.69 km^{2})
  - Water: 5.19 sq mi (13.44 km^{2})
- Elevation: 98 ft (30 m)

Population (2020)
  - City: 44,743
  - Rank: Vermont: 1st
  - Density: 4,339.3/sq mi (1,675.4/km^{2})
  - Urban: 118,032 (U.S.: 289th)
  - Urban density: 1,903.3/sq mi (734.9/km^{2})
  - Metro: 225,562 (U.S.: 208th)
- Time zone: UTC−5 (EST)
  - Summer (DST): UTC−4 (EDT)
- ZIP Codes: 05401–05402, 05405–05406, 05408
- Area code: 802
- FIPS code: 50-10675
- Website: www.burlingtonvt.gov

Burlington is the largest city in the U.S. State of Vermont and the county seat of Chittenden County. It is located 45 miles (72 km) south of the Canada–United States border and 95 miles (153 km) south of Montreal. As of the 2020 United States census, the population was 44,743, making Burlington the most populous municipality in Vermont and the least populous U.S. city to be the most populous city within a state.

A regional college town, Burlington is home to the University of Vermont (UVM) and Champlain College. Vermont's largest hospital, the UVM Medical Center, is within the city limits. The City of Burlington owns Vermont's largest airport, the Patrick Leahy Burlington International Airport, located in neighboring South Burlington. In 2015, Burlington became the first city in the U.S. to run entirely on renewable energy.

== History ==
=== Beginnings to early 20th century ===
King George II of Great Britain placed the western border of the Province of New Hampshire twenty miles (32 km) east of the Hudson River. However, George III moved the Province of New York's border to the Connecticut River. He stated that the land claims of those currently in the area gained by New York were still valid, but New York courts ruled against the settlers. New Hampshire Governor Benning Wentworth continued to sell land in these areas in direct opposition to New York and royal demands. On June 7, 1763, the grant document for Burlington was awarded to Samuel Willis and 63 others. In the summer of 1775, settlers began clearing the land and built two or three log huts in 1775, but the outbreak of the American Revolutionary War delayed permanent settlement until after its conclusion. The first recorded town meeting was held on March 19, 1787.

The origins for the name Burlington is disputed. Benning Wentworth named many areas after rich people. Wealthy New Yorker Edward Burling who held land grants in Colchester, Vermont, or Richard Boyle, 3rd Earl of Burlington, who died a decade before the land grant, are the two candidates for the origin of the name. While no Burling family members are listed as grantees of the town, the family held large tracts of land in nearby towns, some of which were granted on the same day as Burlington. A settler from Burlington, Vermont, named Burlington, Iowa, in honor of it.

In 1808, the world's first lake-going steamboat was built in Burlington.

The War of 1812 was unpopular in Vermont and the rest of New England, which had numerous trading ties with Canada. Neither Vermont nor other New England states provided militia units or financial support. Vermont voters supported the Federalist Party, which opposed the war.

At one point during the war, the U.S. had 5,000 troops stationed in Burlington, outnumbering residents and putting a strain on resources. About 500 soldiers died of disease, which was always a problem due to poor sanitation in army camps. Some soldiers were quartered in the main building at the University of Vermont, where a memorial plaque was erected in 1909 to commemorate them.

In a skirmish on August 2, 1813, British forces from Canada shelled Burlington. This is described as either a bold stroke by the British with an ineffectual response from the Americans or as a weak sally by the British, which was rightly ignored by the Americans. The cannonade lasted about 10 minutes and caused no casualties. The American troops involved were commanded by Naval Lieutenant Thomas Macdonough, later a hero of the Battle of Lake Champlain.

The town's position on Lake Champlain helped it develop into a port of entry and center for trade, particularly after completion of the Champlain Canal in 1823, the Erie Canal in 1825, and the Chambly Canal in 1843. Wharves allowed steamboats to connect freight and passengers with the Rutland & Burlington Railroad and the Vermont Central Railroad. Burlington became a bustling lumbering and manufacturing center – for some time the third largest lumber market in the world – and was incorporated as a city in 1865. Its Victorian-era prosperity left behind much fine architecture, including buildings by Ammi B. Young, H.H. Richardson, and McKim, Mead & White.

On September 5, 1901, U.S. vice president Theodore Roosevelt spoke to a Civil War fraternal group in Burlington. Nine days later, he became U.S. president when President William McKinley died.

=== Late 20th century to present ===
In 1870, the waterfront was extended by construction of the Pine Street Barge Canal. This became polluted over the years and was a focus for cleanup in 2009 under the U.S. Environmental Protection Agency's Superfund program. In fact, the entire Burlington waterfront was a derelict wasteland as late as the mid-1980s, with rail yards, industrial uses and 90 oil storage tanks crowding the 60 acres of shoreline filled into the harbor during the lumbering era.

In 1978, the ice cream enterprise Ben & Jerry's was founded in Burlington in a renovated gas station. It became a national brand, with retail outlets in numerous cities.

In 1980, two 18-story luxury condominium towers were proposed for the waterfront, just north of College Street. Opposition to that proposal led to the formation of the Citizens Waterfront Group to advocate for a bike path along the shore instead.

In 1987, then-Mayor Bernie Sanders proposed a community boathouse to anchor public redevelopment at the waterfront. The land filled into the harbor was eventually redesigned for public use in a decision of the Vermont Supreme Court in 1989.

By 1990, the Burlington Bike Path was complete, from Oakledge Park in the south, to the Winooski River in the north. In 2004, Governor Howard Dean obtained funding for construction of a bike bridge across the Winooski River, allowing the bike path to be extended four miles out into the lake on the old railroad causeway toward the Champlain Islands, now known as the Island Line Trail. The local bicycle advocacy that emerged from this effort led to the formation of the non-profit agency Local Motion. This agency runs a bike ferry during the summer so bicycles can cross a 200-yard gap in the railroad causeway, which enables riders to reach the Lake Champlain islands. and, via Quebec's Route verte, the city of Montreal.

In 2021, following the 2021 Israel–Palestine crisis, the city council scheduled a vote on a "Resolution In Solidarity with the Palestinian People" for September 13. The resolution called on the city council to "express its solidarity with the Palestinian people, condemn anti-boycott legislation, and endorse the Palestinian-led Boycott, Divestment and Sanctions movement, which calls for nonviolent pressure on Israel." The authors' stated reasons for introducing the resolution were Israeli settlements in the West Bank, an ongoing "military siege and an economic blockade" of Gaza, and US military aid to Israel. They also cited reports by Human Rights Watch and B'Tselem that find Israel guilty of the crime of apartheid.

The American Jewish Committee condemned the resolution as "deceptive and one-sided" and criticized it for its sole focus on Israel. A coalition of local rabbis and community groups condemned the resolution as well, citing the timing of the vote during the Jewish High Holy Days, between Rosh Hashanah and Yom Kippur, and fears that the resolution would fuel antisemitism. Former mayor Miro Weinberger called the resolution "inappropriate and counterproductive". In a 6–5 vote, the council decided to withdraw the resolution.

In 2023, three Palestinian-American students were shot and injured in an incident during Thanksgiving break.

== Geography ==
The city of Burlington is situated on the eastern shore of Lake Champlain, north of Shelburne Bay. It was built on a strip of land extending about 6 miles (9.7 km) south from the mouth of the Winooski River along the lake shore, and rises from the water's edge to a height of 300 feet (91 m).

A large ravine in what is now downtown was filled in with refuse and raw sewage in the 19th century to make way for further development.

=== Neighborhoods ===
Burlington is characterized by its neighborhoods, which are generally recognized as follows:

- Downtown: The city's commercial hub is north of Maple Street, west of South Willard Street, and mostly south of Pearl Street (as it includes all property along Pearl Street that is west of South Willard Street).
- Hill Section: Burlington's wealthiest neighborhood is east of South Union Street and Shelburne Street, and south of Main Street, but excludes UVM and University Terrace while including all of Champlain College. The Hill Section is where the Burlington Country Club is situated.
- The Intervale: The Intervale cannot be considered a neighborhood but is a large area encompassing many locally owned organic farms and nature preserves along the Winooski River. Located to the north of the Old North End and east of the New North End, it is included on this list because its total area is larger than that of most neighborhoods in Burlington.
- New North End: Burlington's most populous neighborhood, a northwest suburban extension of the city, includes all points north of Burlington High School, as well as Leddy Park, Ethan Allen Park, and North Beach, and is west of Vermont Route 127 (the "Burlington Beltline").
- Old North End: Burlington's oldest and most densely populated neighborhood is north of all property along Pearl Street, west of Hyde Street and North Willard Street, and is inclusive of areas north of Downtown and west of the University District but south of the New North End and the Intervale. It is here that Burlington's largely Jewish neighborhood known as Little Jerusalem flourished from the 1880s to the 1930s.
- South End: A once mostly industrial and now mostly artistic district south of Downtown and west of the Hill Section, it includes the waterfront Oakledge Park and is home to the headquarters of many of Burlington's nationally known companies like Burton Snowboards and Dealer.com. The historic Five Sisters neighborhood is a smaller district located within the South End.
- University District: The University District is north of the Burlington Country Club, south of the Winooski River, east of Willard Street north of Main, and east of a large chunk of the Hill Section. It includes UVM and many former single-family homes converted to student and yuppie apartments (although these are everywhere throughout the city limits and metropolitan area).

=== Climate ===
Climate chart for Burlington

Burlington has a hot-summer humid continental climate (Köppen Dfa), with cold winters and warm to hot, humid summers. The monthly daily average temperatures range from 21 °F (−6.1 °C) in January to 72 °F (22.2 °C) in July. The annual precipitation of 43 in (1,092 mm) is well-distributed throughout the year, but the summer months are the wettest. The city's location east of Lake Champlain sometimes accounts for localized snow squalls, producing up to 13 inches (33 cm) in 12 hours on rare occasions. Annual snowfall averages 86 inches (218 cm), but this figure can fluctuate greatly from one year to another. Temperature extremes have ranged from −30 °F (−34 °C) on January 15, 1957, and February 12, 1979, to 101 °F (38 °C) on August 11, 1944. The most recorded snowfall from a single storm is 33.1 inches (84.1 cm), which fell January 2–3, 2010.

For the Northeastern United States, a heat wave is defined as having three consecutive days of 90 °F (32 °C) or more. There were six such heat waves from 2000–2009.

Climate data for Patrick Leahy Burlington International Airport, Vermont (1991–2020 normals, (Note: Mean monthly maxima and minima (i.e. the expected highest and lowest temperature readings at any point during the year or given month) calculated based on data at said location from 1991 to 2020.) extremes 1883–present (Note: Official records for Burlington were kept at downtown from December 1883 to 3 June 1943, and at Burlington Int'l since 4 June 1943. For more information, see ThreadEx.))
| Month | Jan | Feb | Mar | Apr | May | Jun | Jul | Aug | Sep | Oct | Nov | Dec | Year |
|---|---|---|---|---|---|---|---|---|---|---|---|---|---|
| Record high °F (°C) | 66 (19) | 72 (22) | 84 (29) | 91 (33) | 95 (35) | 100 (38) | 100 (38) | 101 (38) | 98 (37) | 86 (30) | 76 (24) | 68 (20) | 101 (38) |
| Mean maximum °F (°C) | 51.7 (10.9) | 50.6 (10.3) | 62.0 (16.7) | 78.0 (25.6) | 86.5 (30.3) | 91.4 (33.0) | 92.2 (33.4) | 90.9 (32.7) | 87.0 (30.6) | 76.0 (24.4) | 66.2 (19.0) | 54.2 (12.3) | 94.4 (34.7) |
| Mean daily maximum °F (°C) | 28.9 (−1.7) | 31.5 (−0.3) | 40.9 (4.9) | 55.3 (12.9) | 69.0 (20.6) | 77.6 (25.3) | 82.4 (28.0) | 80.7 (27.1) | 72.6 (22.6) | 58.9 (14.9) | 46.4 (8.0) | 35.0 (1.7) | 56.6 (13.7) |
| Daily mean °F (°C) | 20.9 (−6.2) | 22.9 (−5.1) | 32.3 (0.2) | 45.6 (7.6) | 58.4 (14.7) | 67.5 (19.7) | 72.4 (22.4) | 70.7 (21.5) | 62.7 (17.1) | 50.3 (10.2) | 39.3 (4.1) | 28.2 (−2.1) | 47.6 (8.7) |
| Mean daily minimum °F (°C) | 12.9 (−10.6) | 14.3 (−9.8) | 23.6 (−4.7) | 35.9 (2.2) | 47.8 (8.8) | 57.3 (14.1) | 62.4 (16.9) | 60.7 (15.9) | 52.9 (11.6) | 41.8 (5.4) | 32.1 (0.1) | 21.3 (−5.9) | 38.6 (3.7) |
| Mean minimum °F (°C) | −12.7 (−24.8) | −7.8 (−22.1) | 0.0 (−17.8) | 21.2 (−6.0) | 32.2 (0.1) | 42.3 (5.7) | 50.4 (10.2) | 47.4 (8.6) | 36.2 (2.3) | 26.3 (−3.2) | 13.7 (−10.2) | −1.6 (−18.7) | −15.3 (−26.3) |
| Record low °F (°C) | −30 (−34) | −30 (−34) | −24 (−31) | 2 (−17) | 24 (−4) | 33 (1) | 39 (4) | 35 (2) | 25 (−4) | 15 (−9) | −3 (−19) | −29 (−34) | −30 (−34) |
| Average precipitation inches (mm) | 2.13 (54) | 1.77 (45) | 2.24 (57) | 3.07 (78) | 3.76 (96) | 4.26 (108) | 4.06 (103) | 3.54 (90) | 3.67 (93) | 3.83 (97) | 2.70 (69) | 2.50 (64) | 37.53 (953) |
| Average snowfall inches (cm) | 21.1 (54) | 19.3 (49) | 17.5 (44) | 4.1 (10) | 0.0 (0.0) | 0.0 (0.0) | 0.0 (0.0) | 0.0 (0.0) | 0.0 (0.0) | 0.3 (0.76) | 5.7 (14) | 19.5 (50) | 87.5 (222) |
| Average extreme snow depth inches (cm) | 11.1 (28) | 12.0 (30) | 11.4 (29) | 2.6 (6.6) | 0.0 (0.0) | 0.0 (0.0) | 0.0 (0.0) | 0.0 (0.0) | 0.0 (0.0) | 0.2 (0.51) | 2.7 (6.9) | 7.7 (20) | 17.2 (44) |
| Average precipitation days (≥ 0.01 in) | 14.7 | 12.1 | 12.7 | 13.2 | 13.6 | 13.6 | 12.8 | 11.7 | 11.0 | 12.9 | 13.7 | 15.2 | 157.2 |
| Average snowy days (≥ 0.1 in) | 14.3 | 12.1 | 8.7 | 2.9 | 0.1 | 0.0 | 0.0 | 0.0 | 0.0 | 0.4 | 4.6 | 11.6 | 54.7 |
| Mean monthly sunshine hours | 126.9 | 146.8 | 190.7 | 206.2 | 251.4 | 270.1 | 301.9 | 258.2 | 201.0 | 159.2 | 91.1 | 91.6 | 2,295.1 |
| Percentage possible sunshine | 44 | 50 | 52 | 51 | 55 | 58 | 64 | 59 | 53 | 47 | 32 | 33 | 51 |
| Average ultraviolet index | 1 | 2 | 3 | 5 | 7 | 8 | 8 | 7 | 5 | 3 | 2 | 1 | 4 |
Source 1: NOAA (sun 1961–1990)
Source 2: Weather Atlas (UV)

== Demographics ==
Historical population
| Census | Pop. | Note | %± |
|---|---|---|---|
| 1790 | 332 | | — |
| 1800 | 816 | | 145.8% |
| 1810 | 1,690 | | 107.1% |
| 1820 | 2,111 | | 24.9% |
| 1830 | 3,526 | | 67.0% |
| 1840 | 4,271 | | 21.1% |
| 1850 | 7,585 | | 77.6% |
| 1860 | 7,713 | | 1.7% |
| 1870 | 13,596 | | 76.3% |
| 1880 | 11,365 | | −16.4% |
| 1890 | 14,590 | | 28.4% |
| 1900 | 18,640 | | 27.8% |
| 1910 | 20,468 | | 9.8% |
| 1920 | 22,779 | | 11.3% |
| 1930 | 24,789 | | 8.8% |
| 1940 | 27,686 | | 11.7% |
| 1950 | 33,155 | | 19.8% |
| 1960 | 35,531 | | 7.2% |
| 1970 | 38,633 | | 8.7% |
| 1980 | 37,712 | | −2.4% |
| 1990 | 39,127 | | 3.8% |
| 2000 | 38,889 | | −0.6% |
| 2010 | 42,417 | | 9.1% |
| 2020 | 44,743 | | 5.5% |
U.S. Decennial Census

=== 2020 census ===
As of the 2020 census, Burlington had a population of 44,743. The median age was 27.8 years. 12.5% of residents were under the age of 18 and 11.6% of residents were 65 years of age or older. For every 100 females there were 93.1 males, and for every 100 females age 18 and over there were 91.1 males age 18 and over.

99.9% of residents lived in urban areas, while 0.1% lived in rural areas.

There were 17,412 households in Burlington, of which 17.9% had children under the age of 18 living in them. Of all households, 27.7% were married-couple households, 27.1% were households with a male householder and no spouse or partner present, and 34.1% were households with a female householder and no spouse or partner present. About 36.8% of all households were made up of individuals and 10.7% had someone living alone who was 65 years of age or older.

There were 18,282 housing units, of which 4.8% were vacant. The homeowner vacancy rate was 0.8% and the rental vacancy rate was 2.2%.

Racial composition as of the 2020 census
| Race | Number | Percent |
|---|---|---|
| White | 36,778 | 82.2% |
| Black or African American | 2,155 | 4.8% |
| American Indian and Alaska Native | 104 | 0.2% |
| Asian | 2,421 | 5.4% |
| Native Hawaiian and Other Pacific Islander | 3 | 0.0% |
| Some other race | 502 | 1.1% |
| Two or more races | 2,780 | 6.2% |
| Hispanic or Latino (of any race) | 1,659 | 3.7% |

=== Personal income ===
According to the American Community Survey for 2017–2021, the median income for a household in the city was $59,331. Among workers with full-time, year-round work, males had a median income of $50,552 versus $38,418 for females. The per capita income for the city was $34,054. About 23.8% of the population was below the poverty threshold.

The median value of owner-occupied housing units was $338,100.

== Economy ==
Burlington's economy centers on education, health services, trade, transportation, and utilities, and some manufacturing. In February 2023, the city had an unemployment rate of 2.1%. Mean annual wages were $63,180 in 2022; the state was $59,190.

As of 2019, Moody's set the city's bond credit rating at Aa3, "high" quality.

=== Business and industry ===
The largest employers in the city, and the state overall, are the University of Vermont Medical Center and the University of Vermont, employing over 8,200 and 4,125 people, respectively. Other companies in Burlington include Blodgett Ovens, one of the oldest and largest commercial oven companies in the country, which manufactures restaurant equipment. General Electric develops software for the healthcare industry in South Burlington at the former headquarters of IDX Systems, which it purchased in 2006. General Dynamics Armament and Technical Products division employ 450 workers locally. A solely owned subsidiary, the division is based here. Dealer.com, a leading automotive internet marketing company, employs over 700 people.

Ben & Jerry's began in 1978 when Ben Cohen and Jerry Greenfield opened their first ice cream scoop shop in an old gas station in Burlington and now has a worldwide market and is based in neighboring South Burlington. Vermont Teddy Bear Company, whose founder started on a cart on a Burlington street, now ships custom teddy bears worldwide and is based in nearby Shelburne.

Corporate headquarters located in Burlington include Burton Snowboards, Bruegger's, Lake Champlain Chocolates, Rhino Foods, and Seventh Generation Inc.

=== Retailing and tourism ===
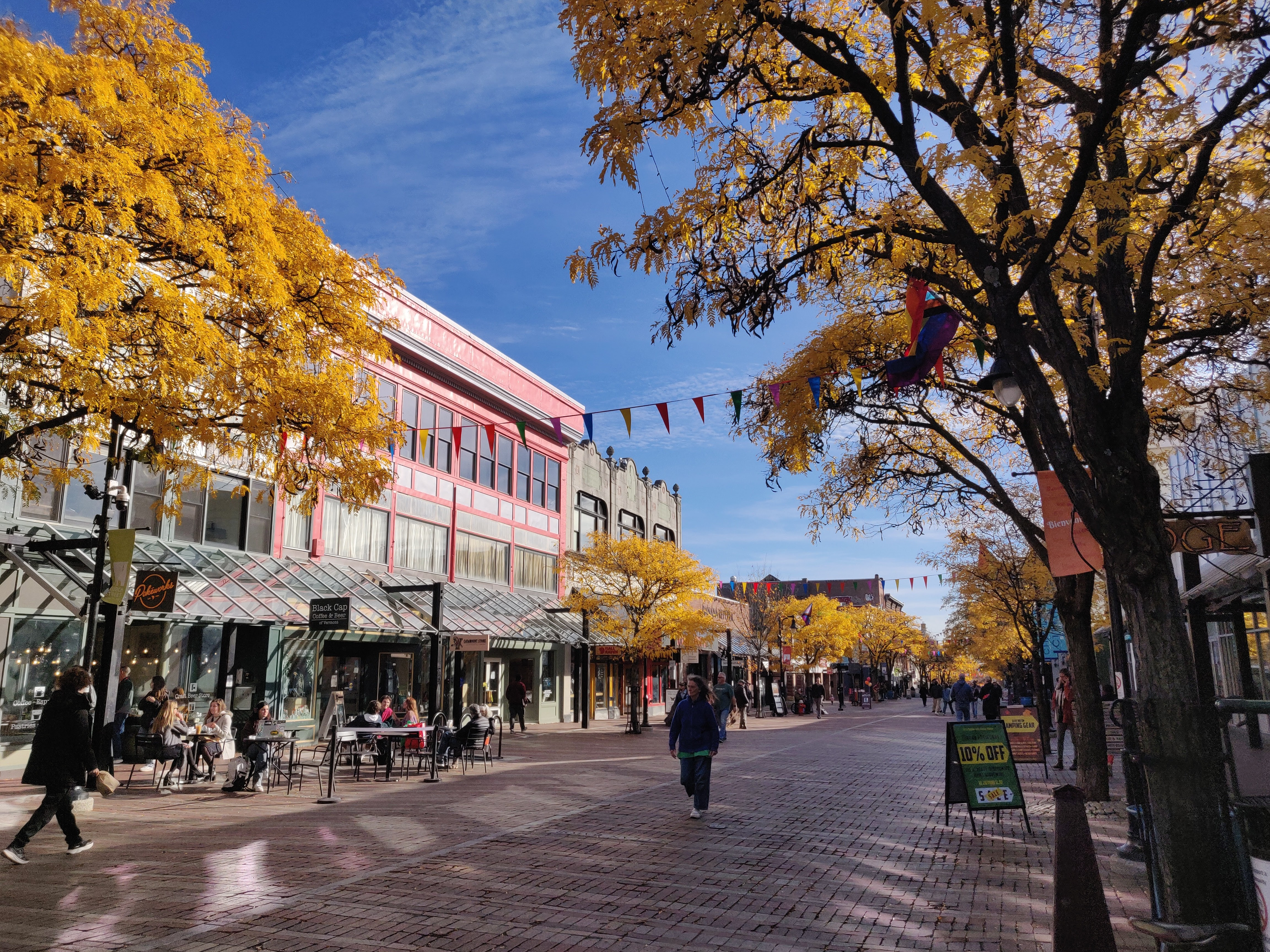
Church Street Marketplace in autumn

In 2017, Burlington had $591.7 million in retail sales.

The Church Street Marketplace, a four-block pedestrian mall in the heart of the city, is the site of festivals throughout the year. Events such as the "South End Art Hop" and public galleries such as Pine Street Art Works, provide a forum for the visual arts in the South End.

A "Festival of Fools" had an estimated 25,000 attendees at the Marketplace in 2009. The "Vermont Brewers Festival" had 9,600 attendees in 2009, and the "Giant Pumpkin Regatta and Festival" had 5,000 attendees that same year; Saturday Night Live satirized the event. One of the largest year-round farmers' markets in the state of Vermont is located in the city.

== Arts and culture ==
Dragon boat races to benefit charity have been held in Lake Champlain in August since 2006. In 2009, there were approximately 2,000 participants on 86 teams.

An annual First Night community celebration of the arts on New Year's Eve was founded in 1983 with funding from the National Endowment on the Arts and Vermont Council on the Arts. It ran for 35 years before shutting down in 2018.

The Drag troupe House of LeMay hosts the annual "Winter is a Drag Ball" which raises funds for HIV/AIDS-related organizations.

The Emily Post Institute, an etiquette organization, is headquartered here.

In 1983, Burlington's City Hall steps hosted an eight-foot public Hanukkah menorah. Mayor Bernie Sanders approved the display and lit its second-night candles, reciting the blessings in Hebrew.

=== Local music ===
The city has, over the years, supported several local bands and has launched a handful of national acts. The most famous of these is Phish, which originated at UVM in 1983.

Other acts with ties to the city include Matisyahu, Kat Wright, Strangefolk, The Essex Green, RAQ, James Kochalka, The Jazz Mandolin Project, Pork Tornado, Anaïs Mitchell, Greg Davis, Koushik, Grace Potter and the Nocturnals, Dispatch, Prydein, Eugene Hutz of Gogol Bordello, Noah Kahan, Morgan Page, KT Tunstall, Rubblebucket, The Vacant Lots, Drowningman, 99 Neighbors, Greg Freeman, and Twiddle.

=== Local art ===
The "South End Art Hop" is an annual event presented by the South End Arts and Business Association. Artists join businesses, artist studios, and galleries, which in turn open their doors to the public throughout the post-industrial section of Burlington, known as the "South End". The first Art Hop in 1993 had a little more than thirty artists and a dozen sites participating. In 2008, over 600 artists showcased their works in over 100 sites throughout the South End of Burlington. The event takes place on the Friday and Saturday following Labor Day in September.

The city has an art department, Burlington City Arts, which serves many roles including cultural planning, education, showing contemporary art and hosting cultural events at The BCA Center. Burlington City Arts also runs a program in collaboration with UVM Medical Center, Art from the Heart, where patients have access to art supplies and devoted volunteer time.

=== Public library ===
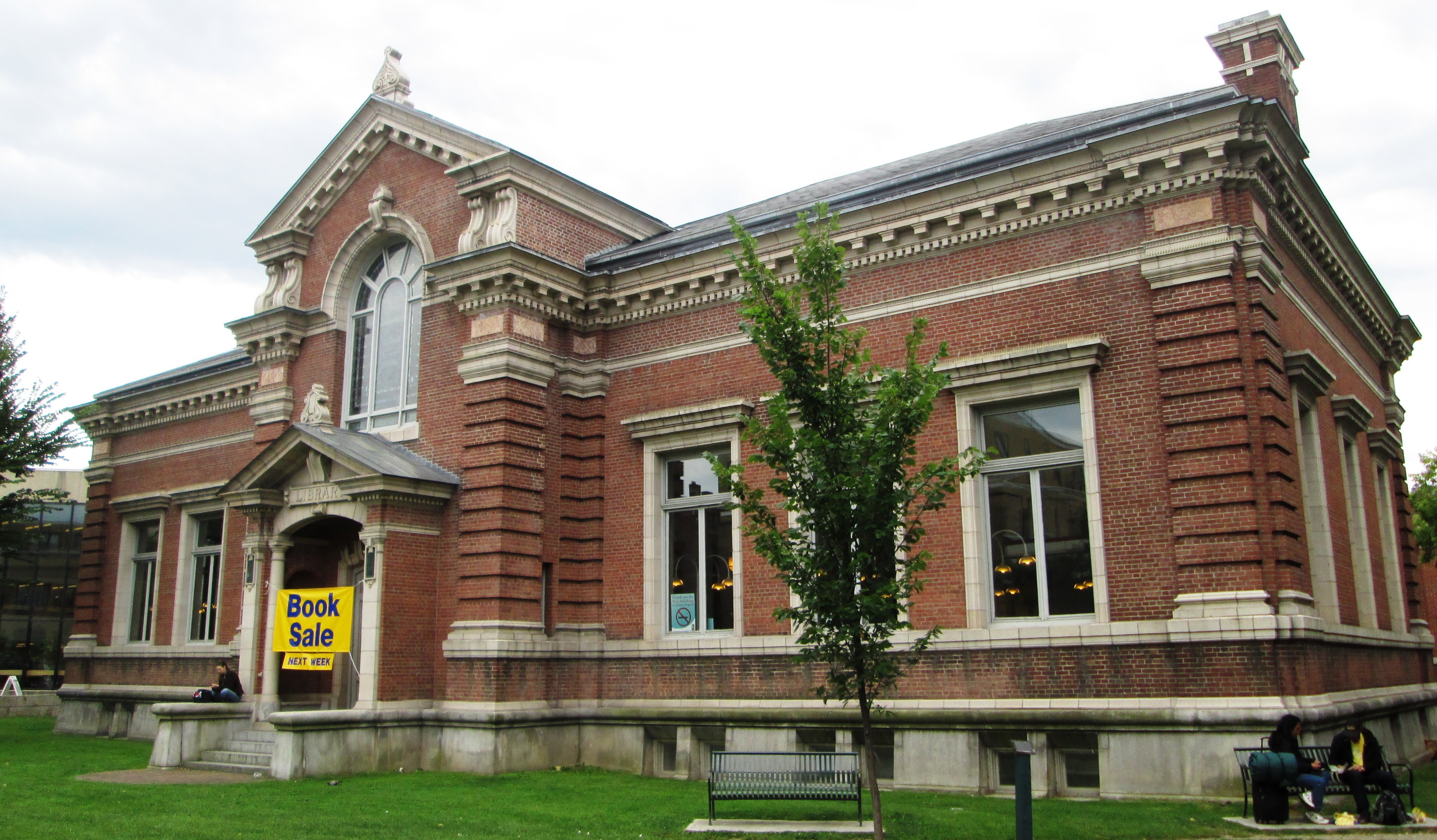
The Carnegie Building of the Fletcher Free Library in 2013

The Fletcher Free Library was established in 1873, endowed by Mary Martha Fletcher, the daughter of a local businessman, but outgrew its initial building on Church Street by 1901. A new building was constructed in 1901–04 with funds provided by industrialist and philanthropist Andrew Carnegie, making it the first of the four Carnegie libraries in Vermont. It was designed in the Beaux-Arts style by Walter R. B. Willcox of Burlington, who won a competition to receive the commission.

The building had major settling problems in 1973 where it had been built over a former railroad ravine, which had been improperly filled in, and the library's collection was moved elsewhere. The possible razing of the building was stopped by a citizens' committee, which successfully had it added to the National Register of Historic Places, and a grant allowed the stabilization and repair of the building. A new modern addition was completed in 1981.

The largest public library in Vermont, and listed on the National Register of Historic Places, the Fletcher Free Library had a budget of over $1 million in 2002. It circulated more books, had more visitors, and had more computers, than any other library in Vermont. In addition to its primary services as Burlington's public library, it is also a community center, a cultural resource for newly arrived immigrants to the Burlington area, and the city's only free public access computer center.

=== Sites of interest ===
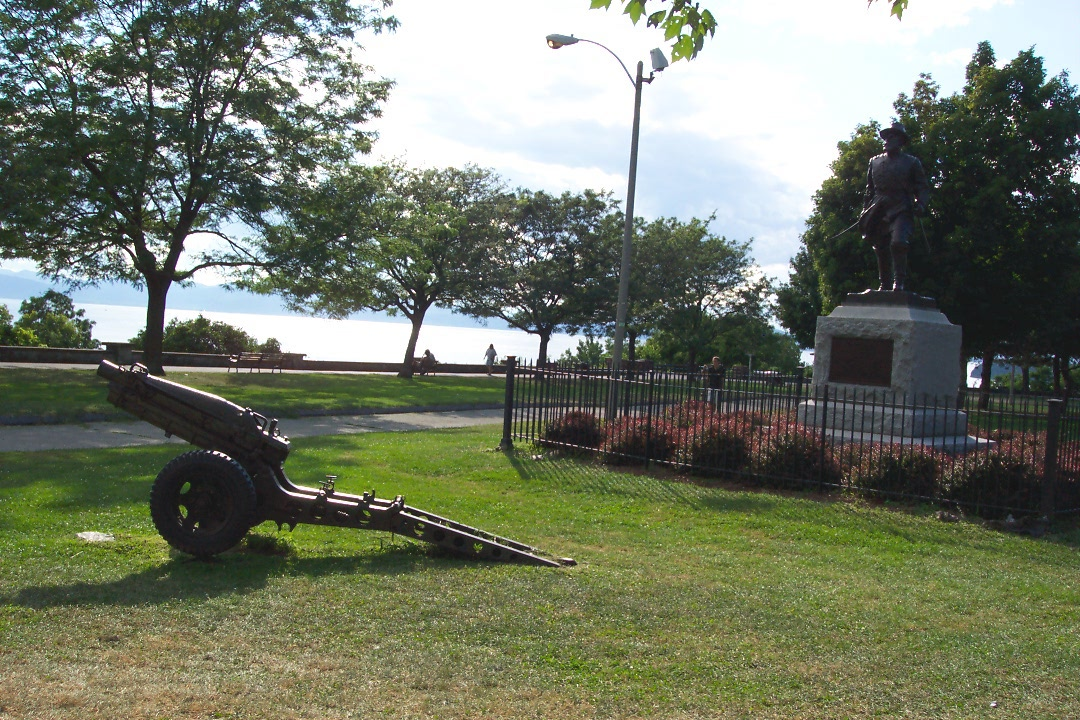
Battery Park, overlooking the Burlington Waterfront and Lake Champlain

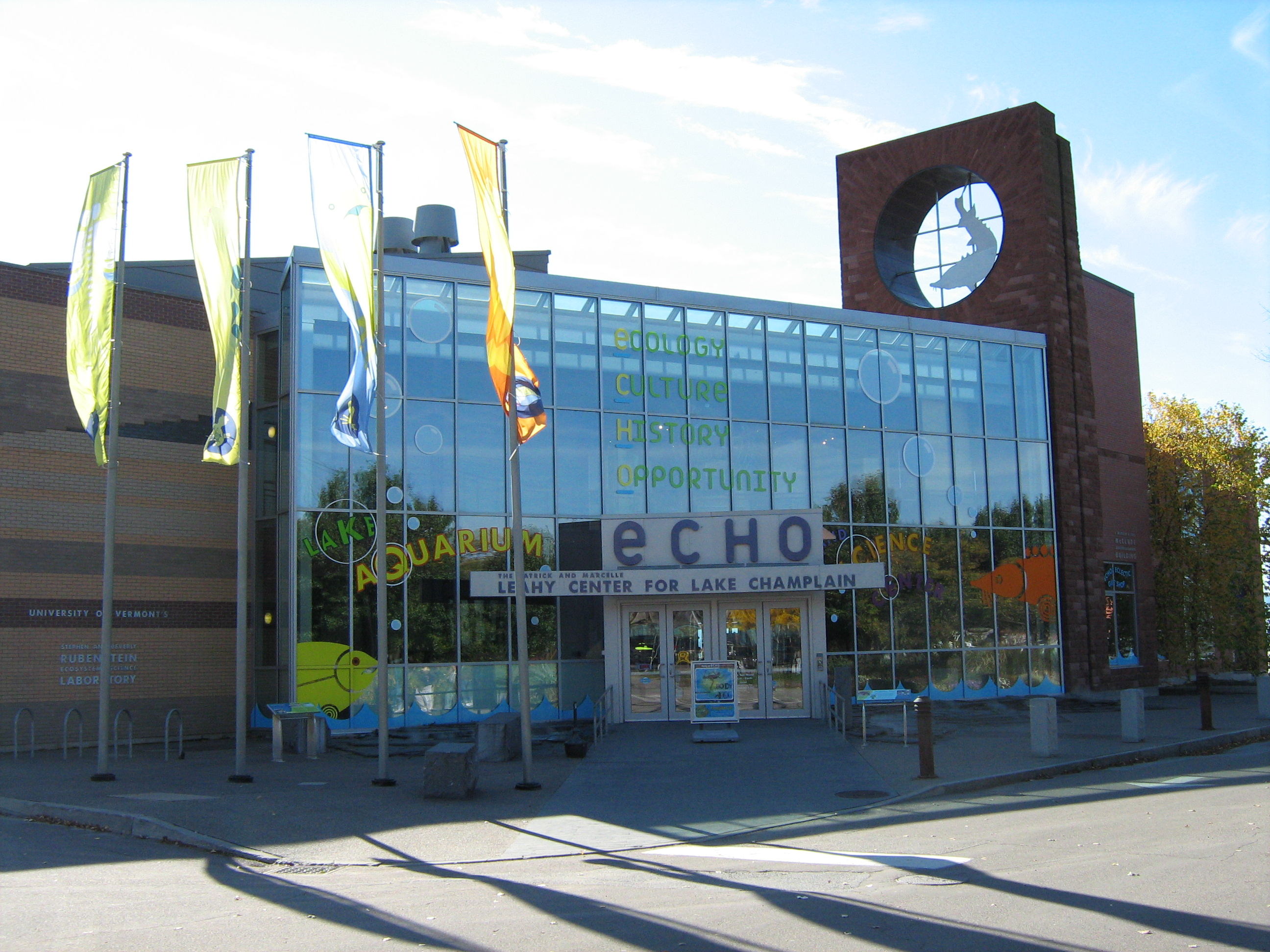
ECHO, Leahy Center for Lake Champlain

- Ethan Allen Homestead Museum
- Chittenden County Historical Society & Museum
- World's Tallest Filing Cabinet
- ECHO, Leahy Center for Lake Champlain
- Robert Hull Fleming Museum at the University of Vermont
- Flynn Center for the Performing Arts
- Burlington Memorial Auditorium (currently closed)
- Burlington Waterfront Park
- The 1885 building of Ohavi Zedek, one of the oldest synagogue buildings still standing in the United States
- Ethan Allen Tower

=== Landmarks and buildings ===
==== Historic buildings ====
Many of Burlington's historic buildings and sites have been recognized by their inclusion on the National Register of Historic Places (NRHP). In addition to 28 buildings, three shipwrecks and the Burlington Breakwater, the city encompasses 17 historic districts.

==== Churches and synagogues ====
Churches in Burlington include the North Avenue Alliance Church, First Baptist Church, First Congregational Church, the Episcopal Cathedral Church of St. Paul, the First United Methodist Church, Christ Church (Presbyterian), the Roman Catholic Cathedral of St. Joseph—the episcopal see for the Diocese of Burlington, the First Unitarian Universalist Society, Dormition of the Mother of God Orthodox Church (Greek Orthodox Archdiocese of America), the College Street Congregational Church (United Church of Christ), The Burlington Church of Christ, and the non-denominational Church at the Well. The Conservative Ohavi Zedek synagogue is also located in the city, and there is an active Meeting of the Religious Society of Friends (Quakers). Synagogues in Burlington include the Chabad of Vermont, Ohavi Zedek, Ahavath Gerim, Ruach HaMaqom, and Ohavi Zedek Chavurah.

The Howard Mortuary Chapel in Lakeview Cemetery was built in 1882 as a gift to the City of Burlington from Hannah Louisa Howard, a local philanthropist. A native of the city, she was the daughter of John Howard, a successful Burlington hotelier. The chapel was designed in the High Victorian Gothic style by Alfred Benjamin Fisher, on cemetery grounds designed by E. C. Ryer in 1871.

The Ira Allen Chapel, on the grounds of the University of Vermont campus, was completed in 1926, and was designed in the Georgian Revival style by McKim, Mead & White. The chapel's flashing beacon provides a nighttime landmark for those approaching Burlington from Lake Champlain. The chapel is part of the University Green Historic District.

Two of the cathedrals in Burlington—the Episcopal Cathedral Church of St. Paul and the former Roman Catholic Cathedral of the Immaculate Conception—are modern structures built after their predecessors were destroyed by arson fires in 1971–1972. The Episcopal Cathedral was completed in 1973 and was designed by Burlington Associates (now TruexCollins) in the Brutalist style, while the Roman Catholic Cathedral was built in 1974–1977 and was designed by Edward Larrabee Barnes, with the park-like grounds designed by landscape architect Dan Kiley. Immaculate Conception was closed in 2018 and replaced by the Cathedral of Saint Joseph (Neoclassical, 1887).

== Sports ==
| Team | Sport(s) | League | Stadium |
|---|---|---|---|
| Vermont Lake Monsters | Baseball | Futures Collegiate Baseball League | Centennial Field |
| Vermont Catamounts | Various | NCAA Division I | Gutterson Fieldhouse |
| Vermont Green FC | Association Football | USL League Two | Virtue Field |

The Vermont Lake Monsters of the Futures Collegiate Baseball League, a collegiate summer baseball team, were formerly called the Vermont Expos. The team changed its name in 2007 after its parent Major League Baseball club, the Montreal Expos of the National League, moved from Montreal to Washington, D.C., and became the Washington Nationals. In 2010, the Lake Monsters ended its 17-year association with the Expos/Nationals and became the Class A affiliate of the Oakland Athletics of the American League. The Lake Monsters play on the campus of the University of Vermont at Centennial Field.

Burlington has a rich hockey history, and was the location of the first known international ice hockey match, held between the Montreal Crystals and employees of the Van Ness House, a local hotel, during the 1886 Burlington Winter Carnival. The University of Vermont's men's hockey team, the Catamounts, play their home games at the 4,007-seat Gutterson Field House on the UVM campus. Burlington was a venue site for the 2012 International Ice Hockey Federation Women's World Championship.

A professional basketball franchise, the Vermont Frost Heaves, played half of their season in the city until the team folded in 2011. The team, which originally was part of the American Basketball Association—not to be confused with the 1970s-era major basketball league of the same name that merged with the National Basketball Association—moved to the Premier Basketball League in 2008 and split their regular-season home games between Burlington and Barre. The Frost Heaves, owned by Sports Illustrated writer Alexander Wolff, played their Burlington games at the Memorial Auditorium, on South Union Street, at the corner of Main. However, the franchise folded in early 2011.

Vermont Green FC, a semi-professional soccer team, was established in 2021 and plays in USL League Two. The team has adopted policies aimed to create a net-zero organization to promote environmental sustainability, which includes recycled materials in merchandise and composting at its home stadium, Virtue Field. The team won their first USL League Two championship in 2025 after an undefeated season.

The Vermont City Marathon has drawn thousands of competitors annually. A local Golden Gloves boxing tournament has been held annually since 1946.

== Government ==
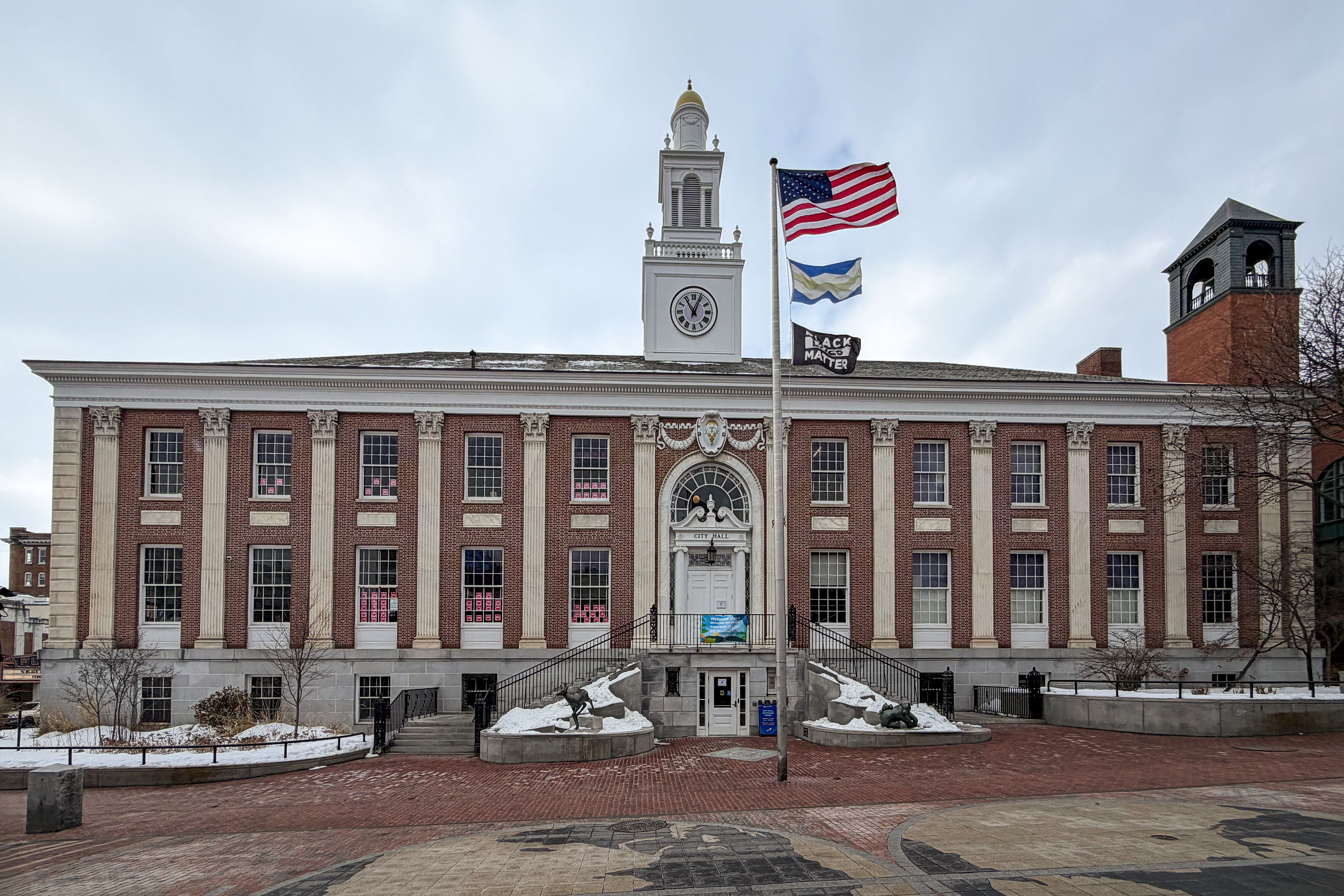
Burlington City Hall in winter

Burlington has had a mayor–council form of government since 1865 with its first mayor being Albert L. Catlin. Democrats and Progressives make up the majority of the council. Emma Mulvaney-Stanak, the current mayor, is a Progressive who was first elected in March 2024. The city council has twelve seats. As of 2024, the city council is composed of six Democrats, five Progressives, and one independent. Ben Traverse, a Democrat, is the current Council President.

U.S. senator and two-time presidential candidate Bernie Sanders served as the mayor of Burlington from 1981 to 1989. His election in 1981 unseated longstanding mayor Gordon Paquette and drastically altered the political landscape of the city. Mayor Sanders created a government that was run by young Progressives, including Peter Clavelle, who was elected mayor of the city when Sanders stepped down to run for higher office. Peter Clavelle, Burlington's longest-serving mayor, held the office from 1989 to 1993, and again from 1995 to 2006.

In the 1980s, the successive reelections of a self-proclaimed "socialist" drew attention from the national media. Sanders has dispelled the notion that his first victory, secured by a narrow margin, was "just a fluke".

The large transient student population votes in local, state, and national elections, resulting in a considerable impact on local elections. The city signed up 2,527 new voters in the six weeks from September 1, 2008, the highest number for that time frame in over nine years.

As a nonprofit institution, the University of Vermont pays no real estate taxes; however, like many other educational institutions, it makes an annual payment in place of taxes. In 2007, the college agreed to raise this from $456,006 to $912,011 in 2010 plus a "public works" supplement rising from $180,040 to $191,004 over the same time frame.

The city maintains three parks on Lake Champlain. All three are free for public access, with two having parking fees.

Alice B. Moore's election to the school commission from the second ward as a Republican in 1921 made her the first woman elected to office in Burlington.

=== City council members ===
In March 2021, Burlington residents voted to implement ranked-choice voting for city councilors. It passed with 64% support. In March 2023, Burlington residents voted to expand ranked-choice voting in city elections, to include races for mayor, city councilors, School Commissioners, Ward Clerks, and Inspectors of Election. This passed with 64% support.

Presidential election results
| Year | Democratic | Republican |
|---|---|---|
| 2024 | 84.3% 17,414 | 10.8% 2,223 |
| 2020 | 86.6% 19,238 | 10.3% 2,293 |
| 2016 | 76.7% 14,519 | 11.0% 2,082 |
| 2012 | 81.3% 14,326 | 14.7% 2,592 |
| 2008 | 82.7% 17,257 | 14.8% 3,086 |
| 2004 | 75.1% 14,468 | 20.9% 4,035 |
| 2000 | 60.7% 10,961 | 23.7% 4,273 |
| 1996 | 65.4% 11,600 | 21.2% 3,762 |
| 1992 | 61.3% 12,510 | 21.9% 4,462 |
| 1988 | 59.5% 9,748 | 39.0% 6,382 |
| 1984 | 55.4% 10,080 | 43.2% 7,857 |
| 1980 | 46.0% 6,752 | 30.7% 4,506 |

== Education ==
=== Public schools ===
Burlington School District operates the city's public schools.

Schools:

- Burlington High School
- The Sustainability Academy (at Lawrence Barnes Elementary)
- Edmunds Elementary School, named after George F. Edmunds, a U.S. senator for 25 years, from 1866 to 1891
- Edmunds Middle School, (formerly Burlington High School)
- Lyman C. Hunt Middle School
- Flynn Elementary School
- Champlain Elementary School
- C. P. Smith Elementary
- The Integrated Arts Academy (at H.O. Wheeler Elementary)

=== Magnet schools ===
In Burlington, students have two choices of magnet schools: the Integrated Arts Academy at H.O. Wheeler (IAA) and the Sustainability Academy at Lawrence Barnes (SA).

=== Private schools ===
- Christ the King School
- Mater Christi School
- Rock Point School

=== Colleges and universities ===
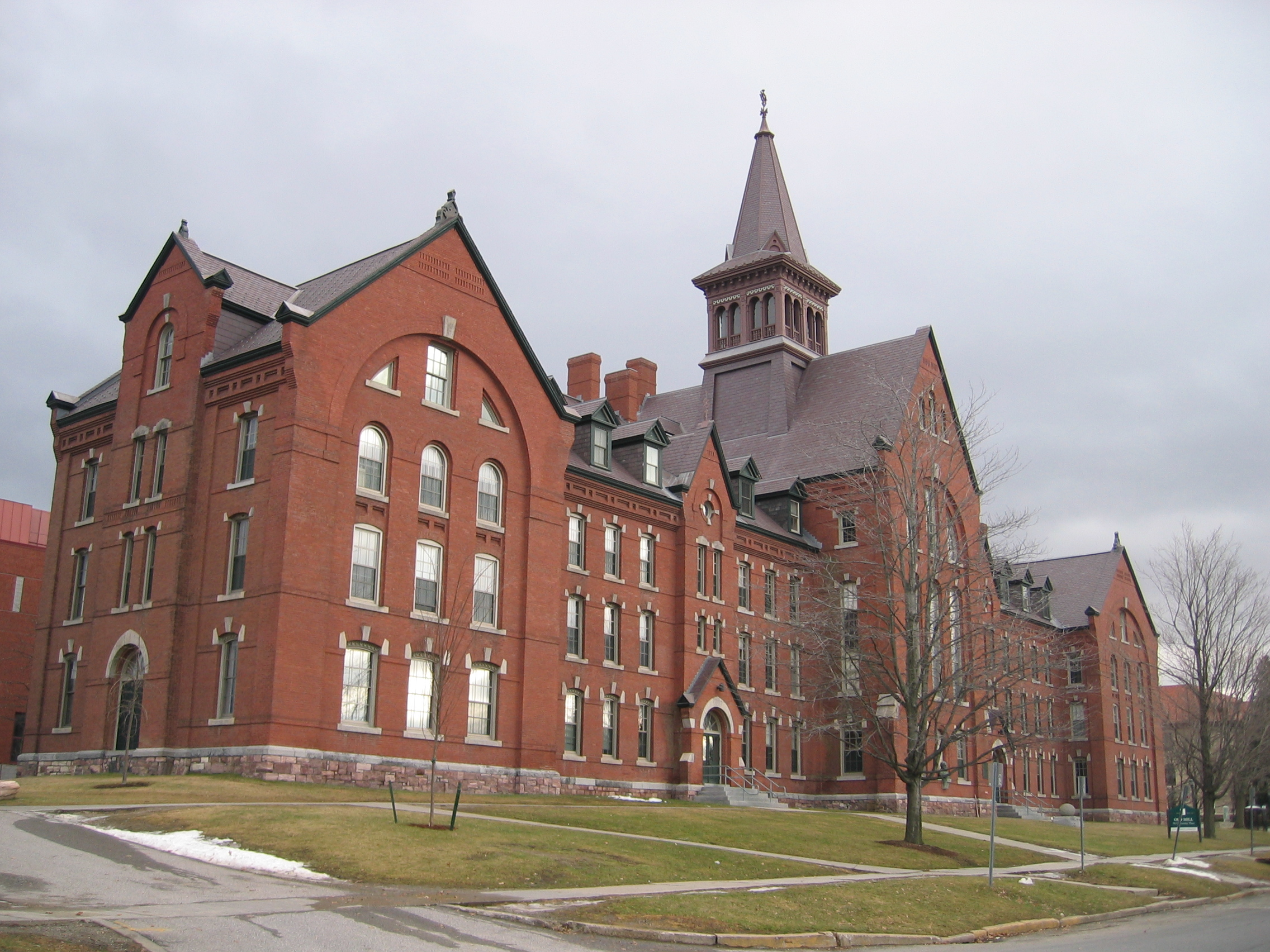
Old Mill at the University of Vermont

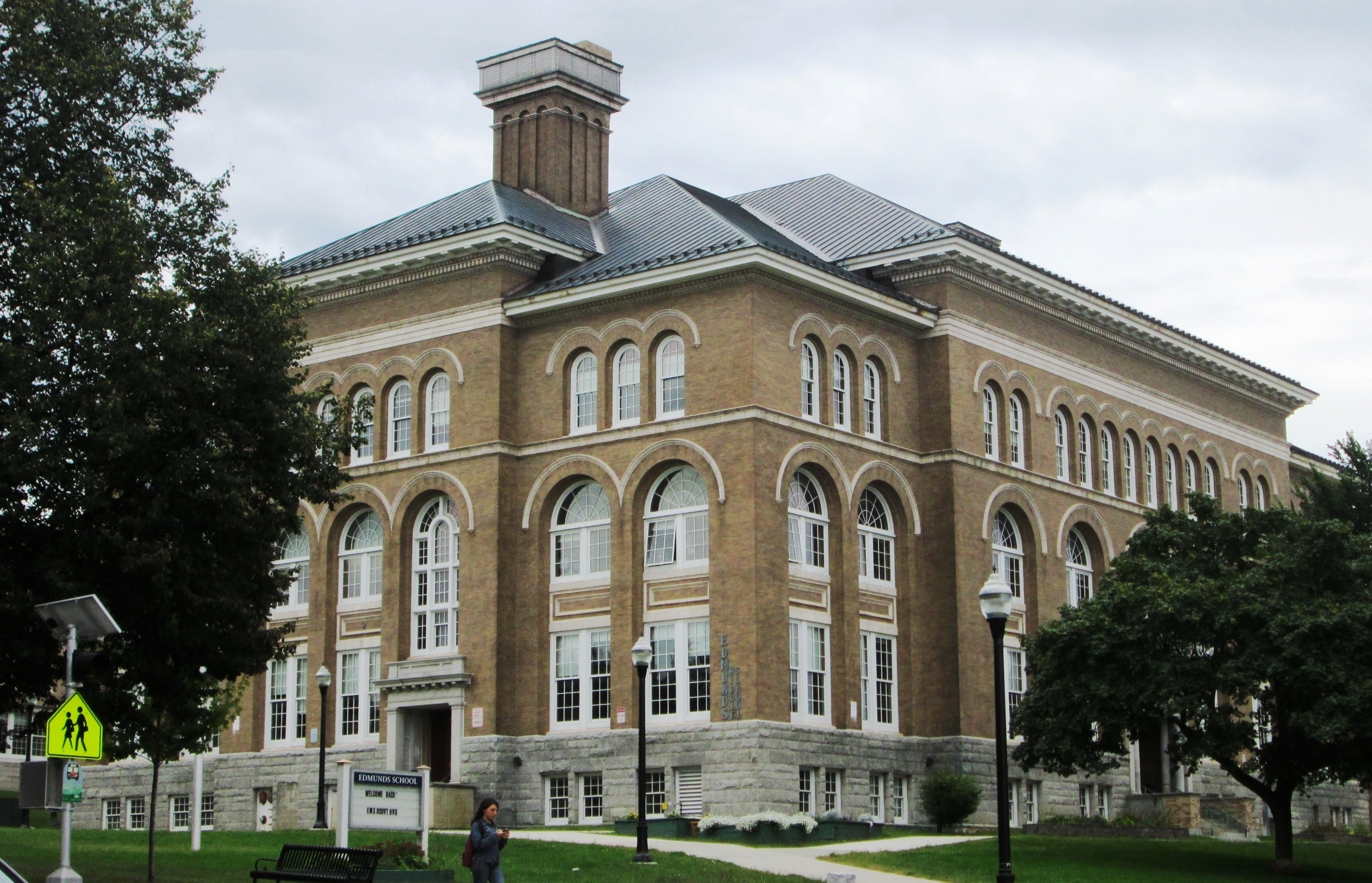
One of the four buildings in the Edmunds School complex

Burlington is home to the University of Vermont (UVM) and Champlain College. Chartered in 1791, UVM is Vermont's land-grant university. Its establishment was supported by Ira Allen, who donated land for the institution. The university's historic campus includes Old Mill, built following a fire that destroyed its predecessor in 1824. UVM's Robert Larner College of Medicine, founded in 1822, provides medical education and conducts biomedical research. The adjacent University of Vermont Medical Center is one of the college's clinical teaching sites.

Champlain College is a private, nonprofit institution offering undergraduate and graduate education, including online programs. Founded in 1878 as the Burlington Collegiate Institute and Commercial College, it initially provided instruction in business subjects such as bookkeeping, stenography, and typing. The college operated in rented premises downtown before establishing its campus in Burlington's Hill Section in 1958. Its academic offerings include business, cybersecurity, filmmaking, and game production.

Former institutions in the city include Trinity College of Vermont and Burlington College. Trinity, founded in 1925 as a Catholic women's college, ceased its academic programs in 2001; UVM purchased its campus in 2002. Burlington College was founded in 1972 as an alternative to conventional classroom-based higher education and closed in 2016 amid financial difficulties.

Other higher-education institutions serve the Burlington area from neighboring municipalities. The Community College of Vermont operates an academic center in Winooski, where it opened a new facility in 2010. Saint Michael's College, a Catholic liberal arts institution founded in 1904, is in Colchester. Vermont State University operates a campus in Williston, offering programs in fields including information technology, allied health, and aviation. The university was formed in July 2023 through the merger of Vermont Technical College, Castleton University, and Northern Vermont University.

== Media ==
=== Newspapers and other publications ===
Burlington is the media center of northern and central Vermont. It is served by:

- The Burlington Free Press, a daily newspaper delivered throughout Vermont
- Seven Days, a free weekly newspaper delivered in bulk to pickup points throughout the Burlington metropolitan area and central Vermont, emphasizing arts and culture
- Vermont Business Magazine
- VTDigger
- The Natural Philosopher, a monthly science news journal articulating primary literature in neuroscience, biochemistry, and genetics. The Natural Philosopher is a student-run publication based at the University of Vermont.
- North End News, a monthly community newspaper mailed for free to 17,000 people in Burlington

=== Radio ===
Major radio stations that are based in Burlington and serve the region:

- WBTZ (The Buzz) – 99.9 FM (modern rock)
- WCPV (101.3 ESPN) – 101.3 FM (sports)
- WCVT (101 The One) – 101.7 FM (classic album tracks)
- WEZF (Star 92.9) – 92.9 FM (hot adult contemporary)
- WIZN (The Wizard) – 106.7 FM (classic rock)
- WJOY – 1230 AM (adult standards)
- WKOL (KOOL 105) – 105.1 FM (classic hits)
- WNCS and W227AQ (The Point) – 104.7 and 93.3 FM, respectively (Triple-A)
- WOKO – 98.9 FM (country)
- WOXR (Vermont Public Radio) – 90.9 FM (classical)
- WRUV (University of Vermont) – 90.1 FM (variety)
- WTNN (Eagle Country) – 97.5 FM
- WVMT – 620 AM (news/talk)
- WVPS (Vermont Public Radio) – 107.9 FM (news & information), National Public Radio
- WWPV (Saint Michael's College) – 92.5 FM (variety)
- WXXX – 95.5 FM (Hit Music Station)

=== Television ===
Five network-affiliated television stations serve the greater Burlington area. They include WFFF-TV channel 44 (Fox), its sister station WVNY channel 22 (ABC), WPTZ channel 5 (NBC, with Me-TV on DT3), its sister station WNNE channel 31 (CW), and WCAX-TV channel 3 (CBS). All of the stations (including WVNY and WNNE which share news departments with WFFF-TV and WPTZ, respectively) operate news departments. Although licensed to Burlington, WCAX is based in neighboring South Burlington, while WPTZ is licensed to Plattsburgh, New York (though also locating its main studio to South Burlington in 2019). WFFF and WVNY are also based in Colchester, while WNNE is licensed to Montpelier. Comcast is the metro area's major cable television service provider, although residents within the Burlington city limits are also served by municipally owned Burlington Telecom.

== Infrastructure ==
=== Transportation ===
==== Bus ====
Burlington is the central focus of Green Mountain Transit (GMT), which provides bus service within the city and to and from surrounding municipalities.

On June 15, 2011, the Chittenden County Transportation Authority announced that it had changed its charter, effective July 1, 2011, to allow municipalities outside Chittenden County to join CCTA as member communities, thereby allowing CCTA to become Vermont's first regional transit authority. As part of its expansion, the CCTA merged with the Green Mountain Transit Authority (GMTA), which provided bus service in the Barre-Montpelier area and surrounding communities in central Vermont.

Greyhound provides intercity bus service from the Downtown Transit Center bus station to other communities in Vermont, and to Montreal's Gare d'autocars de Montreal and Boston's South Station and Logan International Airport. Premier Coach's Vermont Translines also provides intercity bus service between Burlington and Albany, New York, along the U.S. Route 7 corridor in a partnership with Greyhound, also from the airport.

==== Rail ====
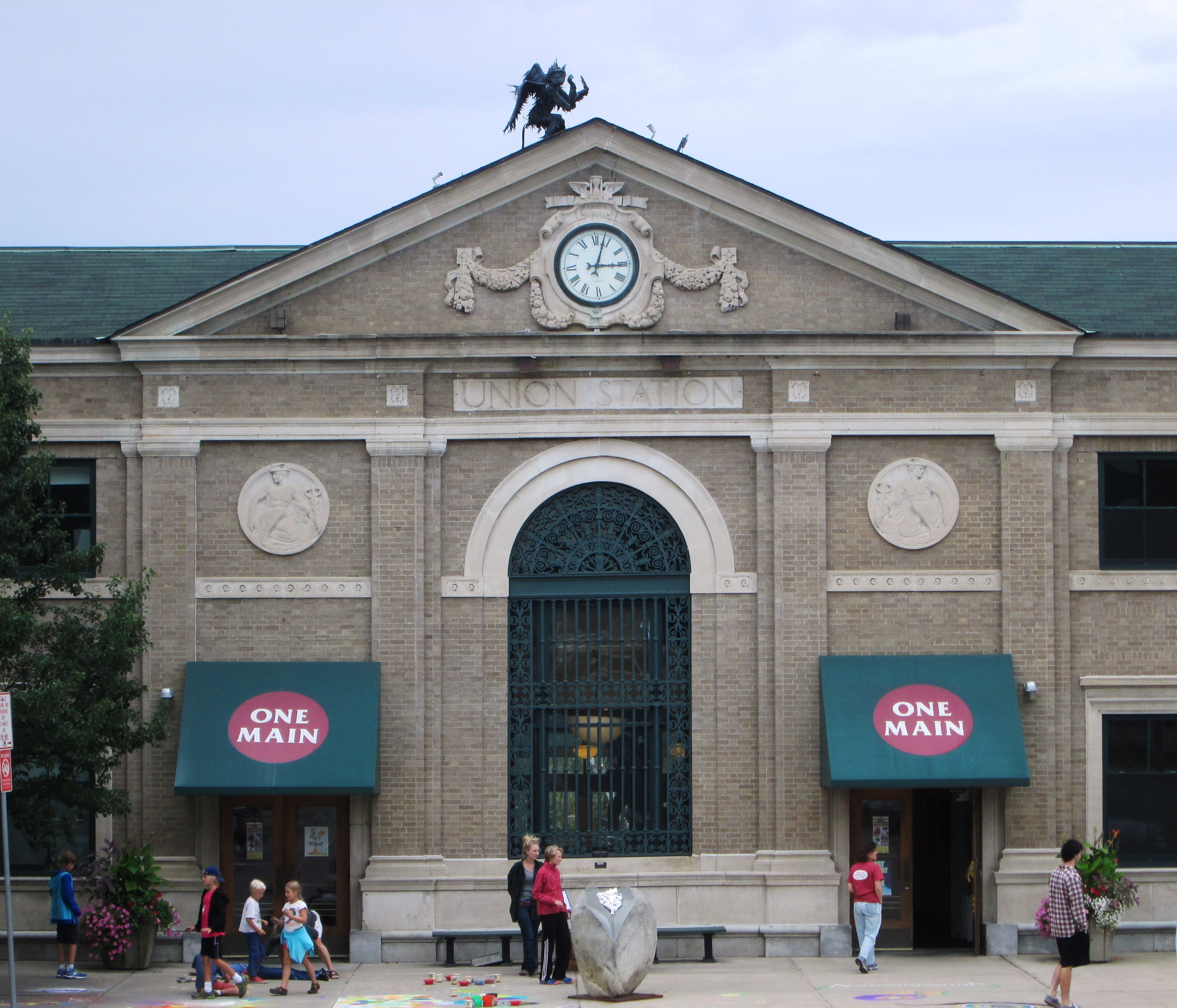
Burlington's Union Station was built in 1916 by the Central Vermont Railway and the Rutland Railroad

Burlington is connected to New York City via Amtrak's Ethan Allen Express, which began serving the city in July 2022. Service is to Union Station, built on the city's waterfront in 1916. The extension to Burlington was first proposed in 2013 by Vermont governor Peter Shumlin. Prior to this, the nearest Amtrak station was located about 6–7 miles (9.7–11.3 km) to the east in Essex Junction, Vermont, which is served by the Vermonter.

Rail service began in Burlington in 1849. From the late nineteenth century to 1953, the Rutland Railroad provided passenger service on the Green Mountain Flyer and the Mount Royal from Burlington to Troy, New York, with connecting service to New York City via the New York Central Railroad. The last passenger train to run north via the Burlington Tunnel to Alburgh, a town in the northwest extremity of Vermont, was in June 1938. From 2000 to 2003, the Champlain Flyer was a commuter service from Burlington south to the town of Charlotte, Vermont.

==== Air ====
Air carriers at Patrick Leahy Burlington International Airport (BTV) provide the area with commercial service to major regional hubs and international airports. While scheduled carriers have not traditionally offered scheduled commercial flights to destinations outside the United States, there is a Customs Port of Entry for unscheduled flights. From 2011 to 2018, the only available international commercial flights for BTV were via Porter Airlines' winter seasonal service to and from Billy Bishop Airport in Toronto.

==== Major roads ====
Burlington is served by one major Interstate highway, along with its spur route into the southern part of the city, and is at the junction of two U.S. highways. Several Vermont state highways also provide routes into and through the Burlington area.

- Interstate 89: Though it does not directly enter the Burlington city limits, I-89 has interchanges in neighboring South Burlington, Winooski, and Colchester that provide access to downtown.
- Interstate 189: I-189 connects I-89 in South Burlington to the Champlain Parkway and U.S. 7 at the southern end of Burlington.
- U.S. Route 2 is the main east–west route entering Burlington. After entering the city from the east, westbound U.S. 2 turns north to run concurrently with U.S. 7 towards Winooski and Colchester. The intersection with Interstate 89 is used by 42,000 cars daily.
- U.S. Route 7 is the main north–south route through Burlington. Northbound U.S. 7 joins westbound U.S. 2 in downtown Burlington, and the two routes run concurrently north to Colchester before diverging.
- Vermont Route 127 connects downtown and the Old North End with the New North End and the town of Colchester. Throughout the New North End, VT-127 is a limited-access highway officially named the Winooski Valley Parkway, though commonly known as the "Burlington Beltline".

==== Ferry service ====
Burlington is the headquarters of the Lake Champlain Transportation Company, a privately held company that offers ferry service for the North Country of New York state and the Champlain Valley region of Vermont. One line of year-round 24-hour service is provided from the nearby town of Grand Isle, Vermont, to Plattsburgh, New York, with another line of daily service from Charlotte, Vermont, to Essex, New York.

=== Internet ===
The city has municipal fiber broadband, which provides telephone, broadband internet, and television. In 2008, cable management tried to drop Al-Jazeera English from the lineup. This was successfully thwarted by protesters and the station was, in 2009, one of three "small cable operators" in the nation to carry this channel.

=== Electricity ===
Burlington owns its own power company, Burlington Electric Department. In 2009, the department announced that it would purchase 40% of the output of the 40 MW Sheffield, Vermont, wind-generated electricity when it became available.

==== Renewable energy ====
Burlington began operating on 100% renewable energy in 2014 after being a pioneer in the renewable energy sector for decades. The Burlington Electric Department, which began operating in 1903, originally used coal as a primary source of energy. However, after experiencing the effects of fluctuating coal prices throughout the second World War, the department slowly began using wood as an energy source because of the price and overall energy efficiency of wood. Since then, the city has experienced a sustainability boom, and today runs on 100% renewable energy. A succession of mayors in the city, along with corresponding public interest, are credited with this change. Gordon Paquette made the decision to completely transition from coal to wood at the McNeil Generating Station in 1977, and Bernie Sanders picked up this momentum of the environmental movement in the small city. This continued with Peter Clavelle, who mandated recycling in the city, and passed a number of bonds which funded energy improvements in infrastructure. In 1995, the city issued the Legacy Plan, which aimed to "go beyond the branding and rhetoric and create actual examples that will resonate and make a difference in people's lives."

Today, that plan has come to fruition in many ways. The city operates entirely on energy from the Winooski One Hydro Plant, a series of wind turbines and solar panels, as well as the sustainably sourced wood burning plant at McNeil Generating Station. This made Burlington the first city to run completely on sustainable energy sources: a landmark for green infrastructure. Along with keeping energy rates low for customers, sustainability in the city extends beyond energy infrastructure. A non-profit organization in the city started an incubator farm that produces 30,000 pounds of fresh, local food for those facing food insecurity. The city has also worked on drastic building restoration projects, installed bikeways for more efficient transportation, and prioritized energy saving in the downtown.

In September 2019, the former mayor Miro Weinberger announced plans to get the city to net zero status by 2030. This would mean that the city would produce and consume equal amounts of energy. In October 2020, Burlington Electric proposed an ordinance that would require all buildings in the city to switch to electric energy sources. This would put the city closer to that net-zero goal, and continues its legacy as a trailblazer for sustainable infrastructure.

=== Health and social services ===
Burlington is home to University of Vermont Medical Center, a tertiary referral hospital for Vermont and the North Country of New York, Level I Trauma Center, and teaching hospital.

In 2010, the government banned smoking within 25 feet (7.6 m) of the city's parks and recreational areas.

Howard Center, headquartered in Burlington, provides social services to state residents, and runs Vermont's first and the area's only methadone maintenance program, the Chittenden Clinic.

=== Signage ===
Burlington City Council unanimously voted on August 8, 2011, a resolution to promote the use of French in municipal public services, in restaurant menus and in second language courses in schools.

== Sister cities ==
=== Sister cities ===
Burlington's sister cities are:

- Arad, Israel
- Bethlehem, Palestine
- Burlington, Canada
- Honfleur, France
- Moss Point, Mississippi, United States
- Nishinomiya, Hyōgo Prefecture, Japan
- Puerto Cabezas, Nicaragua
- Yaroslavl, Russia (suspended in 2022)

=== Sister lakes ===
Burlington's sister lakes are:

- Lake Ohrid, on the border of North Macedonia and Albania
- Lake Toba, Indonesia

== See also ==
- Champlain College
- Five Sisters (Burlington, Vermont)
- University of Vermont

== Works cited ==
- Barton, April (September 30, 2021). "How did Burlington get its name, and how do we stack up against those other B-towns?". The Burlington Free Press.
- Coolidge, Austin; Mansfield, J. (1859). A History and Description of New England, General and Local. H.O. Houghton and Company.
- Kelley, Kevin (July 3, 2013). "What's in a Name? The Origins of "Burlington"". Seven Days. Archived from the original on August 5, 2024.
- Resnik, Robert (December 12, 2014). "History Space: The origins of Burlington". The Burlington Free Press.
