= Electoral history of Peter Diamondstone =

American political record

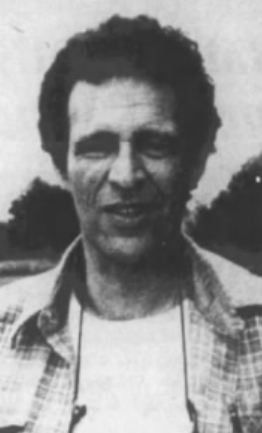
Diamondstone in 1988.

Peter Diamondstone was a perennial candidate in state and federal elections in Vermont, primarily representing the Liberty Union Party. Diamondstone ran for various offices over almost five decades, including the U.S. Senate, the U.S. House, Attorney General of Vermont, and Governor of Vermont.

== 1970s ==
1970 Vermont Attorney General election
Primary election
Party	Candidate	Votes	%
Democratic	Thomas P. Salmon	19,513	66.97%
Democratic	Peter Diamondstone	9,553	32.79%
Write-in		71	0.24%
Total votes		29,137	100.00%
General election
Republican	Jim Jeffords	85,515	57.83%
Democratic	Thomas P. Salmon	60,373	40.83%
Liberty Union	Peter Diamondstone	1,987	1.34%
Write-in		7	0.00%
Total votes		147,882	100.00%

1972 Vermont Attorney General election
Primary election
Party	Candidate	Votes	%
Republican	Kimberly B. Cheney	20,307	33.62%
Republican	Natt L. Divoll	18,300	30.30%
Republican	Robert E. West	13,095	21.68%
Republican	Sten E. Lium	5,009	8.29%
Republican	Peter Diamondstone	3,669	6.07%
Write-in		24	0.04%
Total votes		60,404	100.00%
General election
Republican	Kimberly B. Cheney	101,480	57.89%
Democratic	Richard Gadbois	67,884	38.72%
Liberty Union	Peter Diamondstone	5,989	3.36%
Write-in		43	0.02%
Total votes		175,305	100.00%

1974 Vermont's at-large congressional district Democratic primary
Party	Candidate	Votes	%
Democratic	Francis J. Cain	9,415	41.37%
Democratic	Margaret A. Lucenti	3,384	14.87%
Democratic	John J. Welch	3,004	13.20%
Democratic	Francis J. Esposito	2,804	12.32%
Democratic	Dennis J. Morrisseau	2,623	11.52%
Democratic	Peter Diamondstone	1,426	6.27%
Write-in		105	0.46%
Total votes		22,761	100.00%

1976 Vermont Attorney General election
Party	Candidate	Votes	%
Democratic	M. Jerome Diamond (incumbent)	89,839	53.17%
Republican	John P. Meaker	71,960	42.59%
Liberty Union	Peter Diamondstone	7,153	4.23%
Write-in		15	0.01%
Total votes		168,967	100.00%

1978 Vermont's at-large congressional district election
Primary election
Party	Candidate	Votes	%
Liberty Union	Peter Diamondstone	198	100.00%
Total votes		198	100.00%
General election
Republican	Jim Jeffords (incumbent)	90,668	75.26%
Democratic	Thomas P. Salmon	23,228	19.28%
Liberty Union	Peter Diamondstone	6,505	5.40%
Write-in		81	0.07%
Total votes		120,482	100.00%

== 1980s ==
1980 Vermont's at-large congressional district election
Primary election
Party	Candidate	Votes	%
Liberty Union	Peter Diamondstone	263	100.00%
Total votes		263	100.00%
General election
Republican	Jim Jeffords (incumbent)	154,274	79.03%
Citizens	Robin Lloyd	25,280	12.95%
Liberty Union	Peter Diamondstone	15,218	7.80%
Write-in		447	0.23%
Total votes		195,219	100.00%

1982 Vermont's at-large congressional district election
Primary election
Party	Candidate	Votes	%
Liberty Union	Peter Diamondstone	200	100.00%
Total votes		200	100.00%
General election
Republican	Jim Jeffords (incumbent)	114,191	69.23%
Democratic	Mark A. Kaplan	38,296	23.22%
Citizens	Robin Lloyd	6,409	3.89%
Liberty Union	Peter Diamondstone	2,794	1.69%
Natural Law	Morris Earle	1,733	1.85%
Libertarian	George E. Trask (write-in)	1,407	0.85%
Write-in		121	0.07%
Total votes		164,951	100.00%

1984 Vermont's at-large congressional district election
Primary election
Party	Candidate	Votes	%
Liberty Union	Peter Diamondstone	226	92.62%
Write-in		18	7.38%
Total votes		244	100.00%
General election
Republican	Jim Jeffords (incumbent)	148,025	65.41%
Democratic	Anthony Pollina	60,360	26.67%
Libertarian	Jim Hedbor	9,359	4.14%
Liberty Union	Peter Diamondstone	4,858	2.15%
Small is Beautiful	Morris Earle	3,313	1.46%
Write-in		382	0.17%
Total votes		226,297	100.00%

1986 Vermont's at-large congressional district election
Primary election
Party	Candidate	Votes	%
Liberty Union	Peter Diamondstone	149	100.00%
Total votes		149	100.00%
General election
Republican	Jim Jeffords (incumbent) (Note: In this election, Jeffords also received the nomination of the Democratic Party.)	168,403	89.12%
Pro-Life	John T. McNulty	7,404	3.92%
Liberty Union	Peter Diamondstone	7,060	3.74%
Small is Beautiful	Morris Earle	5,850	3.10%
Write-in		237	0.13%
Total votes		188,954	100.00%

1988 Vermont's at-large congressional district election
Primary election
Party	Candidate	Votes	%
Liberty Union	Peter Diamondstone	124	100.00%
Total votes		124	100.00%
General election
Republican	Peter Plympton Smith	98,937	41.21%
Independent	Bernie Sanders	90,026	37.50%
Democratic	Paul N. Poirier	45,330	18.88%
Libertarian	Jim Hedbor	3,109	1.30%
Liberty Union	Peter Diamondstone	1,455	0.61%
Small is Beautiful	Morris Earle	1,070	0.45%
Write-in		161	0.07%
Total votes		240,088	100.00%

== 1990s ==
1990 Vermont's at-large congressional district election
Primary election
Party	Candidate	Votes	%
Democratic	Dolores Sandoval	5,979	41.27%
Democratic	Peter Diamondstone	5,711	39.42%
Democratic	Bernie Sanders (write-in)	2,005	13.84%
Write-in		791	5.46%
Total votes		14,486	100.00%
General election
Independent	Bernie Sanders	117,522	56.00%
Republican	Peter Plympton Smith (incumbent)	82,938	39.52%
Democratic	Dolores Sandoval	6,315	3.01%
Liberty Union	Peter Diamondstone	1,965	0.94%
Write-in		1,116	0.53%
Total votes		209,856	100.00%

1992 Vermont's at-large congressional district election
Primary election
Party	Candidate	Votes	%
Liberty Union	Peter Diamondstone	308	100.00%
Total votes		308	100.00%
General election
Independent	Bernie Sanders (incumbent)	162,724	57.78%
Republican	Tim Philbin	86,901	30.86%
Democratic	Lewis E. Young	22,279	7.91%
Liberty Union	Peter Diamondstone	3,660	1.30%
Natural Law	John Dewey	3,549	1.26%
Freedom for LaRouche	Douglas M. Miller	2,049	0.73%
Write-in		387	0.14%
Total votes		281,626	100.00%

1994 Vermont Attorney General election
Primary election
Party	Candidate	Votes	%
Liberty Union	Peter Diamondstone	278	100.00%
Total votes		278	100.00%
General election
Republican	Jeffrey Amestoy (incumbent) (Note: In this election, Amestoy also received the nomination of the Democratic Party.)	176,857	87.14%
Liberty Union	Peter Diamondstone	11,210	5.52%
Natural Law	Joseph P. Mulcahy	7,753	3.73%
Grassroots	Ted Talcott	7,062	3.48%
Write-in		268	0.13%
Total votes		202,970	100.00%

1996 Vermont Attorney General election
Party	Candidate	Votes	%
Republican	Jeffrey Amestoy (incumbent)	208,228	87.23%
Grassroots	Tom Kingston	14,443	6.05%
Liberty Union	Peter Diamondstone	8,380	3.51%
Natural Law	Henry H. Huston, Jr	7,316	3.06%
Write-in		341	0.14%
Total votes		238,708	100.00%

1996 Vermont's at-large congressional district election
Primary election
Party	Candidate	Votes	%
Liberty Union	Peter Diamondstone	237	100.00%
Total votes		237	100.00%
General election
Independent	Bernie Sanders (incumbent)	140,678	55.23%
Republican	Susan W. Sweetser	83,021	32.60%
Democratic	Jack Long	23,830	9.36%
Libertarian	Thomas J. Morse	2,693	1.06%
Liberty Union	Peter Diamondstone	1,965	0.77%
Grassroots	Robert Melamede	1,350	0.53%
Natural Law	Norio Kushi	812	0.32%
Write-in		357	0.14%
Total votes		254,706	100.00%

1998 Vermont's at-large congressional district Democratic primary
Party	Candidate	Votes	%
Democratic	Bernie Sanders (incumbent) (write-in)	1,661	47.88%
Democratic	Mark Candon (write-in)	524	15.11%
Democratic	Jack Long (write-in)	465	13.40%
Democratic	Peter Diamondstone (write-in)	352	10.15%
Write-in		467	13.46%
Total votes		3,469	100.00%

1998 Vermont's at-large congressional district Republican primary
Party	Candidate	Votes	%
Republican	Mark Candon	23,101	48.43%
Republican	Jack Long	15,716	32.95%
Republican	Peter Diamondstone	8,327	17.46%
Write-in		552	1.16%
Total votes		47,696	100.00%

1998 Vermont's at-large congressional district election
Party	Candidate	Votes	%
Independent	Bernie Sanders (incumbent)	136,403	63.40%
Republican	Mark Candon	70,740	32.88%
Grassroots	Matthew S. Mulligan	3,464	1.61%
Liberty Union	Peter Diamondstone	2,153	1.00%
Libertarian	Robert Maynard	2,097	0.98%
Write-in		276	0.13%
Total votes		215,133	100.00%

== 2000s ==
2000 Vermont's at-large congressional district election
Primary election
Party	Candidate	Votes	%
Democratic	Peter Diamondstone	20,539	90.94%
Democratic	Bernie Sanders (incumbent) (write-in)	1,337	5.92%
Write-in		710	3.14%
Total votes		22,586	100.00%
General election
Independent	Bernie Sanders (incumbent)	196,118	69.21%
Republican	Karen Ann Kerin	51,977	18.34%
Liberty Union	Peter Diamondstone (Note: In this election, Diamondstone also received the nominations of the Democratic Party and the Organic Life Party.)	14,918	5.26%
Independent	Stewart Skrill	11,816	4.17%
Grassroots	Jack Rogers	4,799	1.69%
Libertarian	Daniel H. Krymkowski	2,978	1.05%
Write-in		766	0.27%
Total votes		283,372	100.00%

2002 Vermont gubernatorial election
Primary election
Party	Candidate	Votes	%
Progressive	Michael J. Badamo	931	52.07%
Progressive	Peter Diamondstone	412	23.04%
Write-in		445	24.89%
Total votes		1,788	100.00%
General election
Republican	Jim Douglas	103,436	44.94%
Democratic	Doug Racine	97,565	42.39%
Independent	Cornelius Hogan	22,353	9.71%
Marijuana	Cris Ericson	1,737	0.76%
Progressive	Michael J. Badamo	1,380	0.60%
Libertarian	Joel W. Williams	938	0.41%
Grassroots	Patricia Hejny	771	0.34%
Restore Justice-Freedom	Marilynn Christian	638	0.28%
Liberty Union	Peter Diamondstone	625	0.27%
Independent	Brian Pearl	569	0.25%
Write-in		149	0.07%
Total votes		230,161	100.00%

2004 Vermont gubernatorial election
Primary election
Party	Candidate	Votes	%
Progressive	Martha Abbott (write-in)	375	55.07%
Progressive	Peter Diamondstone	190	27.90%
Write-in		116	17.03%
Total votes		681	100.00%
General election
Republican	Jim Douglas (incumbent)	181,540	58.74%
Democratic	Peter Clavelle	117,327	37.96%
Marijuana	Cris Ericson	4,221	1.37%
Independent	Patricia Hejny	2,431	0.79%
Libertarian	Harland Arthur Macia III	2,263	0.73%
Liberty Union	Peter Diamondstone	1,298	0.42%
Write-in		205	0.07%
Total votes		309,285	100.00%

2006 United States Senate election in Vermont
Primary election
Party	Candidate	Votes	%
Liberty Union	Peter Diamondstone	160	94.67%
Write-in		9	5.33%
Total votes		169	100.00%
General election
Independent	Bernie Sanders	171,638	65.41%
Republican	Richard Tarrant	84,924	32.36%
Independent	Cris Ericson	1,735	0.66%
Green	Craig Hill	1,536	0.59%
Anti-Bushist Candidate	Peter Moss	1,518	0.58%
Liberty Union	Peter Diamondstone	801	0.31%
Write-in		267	0.10%
Total votes		262,419	100.00%

2008 Vermont gubernatorial election
Primary election
Party	Candidate	Votes	%
Liberty Union	Peter Diamondstone	128	94.81%
Write-in		7	5.19%
Total votes		135	100.00%
General election
Republican	Jim Douglas (incumbent)	170,492	53.43%
Independent	Anthony Pollina	69,791	21.87%
Democratic	Gaye Symington	69,534	21.79%
Cheap Renewable Energy	Tony O'Connor	3,106	0.97%
Independent	Sam Young	2,490	0.78%
Liberty Union	Peter Diamondstone	1,710	0.54%
Independent	Cris Ericson	1,704	0.53%
Write-in		258	0.08%
Total votes		319,085	100.00%

== 2010s ==
2010 United States Senate election in Vermont
Party	Candidate	Votes	%
Democratic	Patrick Leahy (incumbent)	151,281	64.98%
Republican	Len Britton	72,699	31.23%
Independent	Daniel Freilich	3,544	1.52%
Marijuana	Cris Ericson	2,731	1.17%
Independent	Stephen J. Cain	2,356	1.01%
Liberty Union	Peter Diamondstone	1,433	0.62%
Independent	Johenry Nunes	1,021	0.44%
Write-in		113	0.05%
Total votes		232,822	100.00%
	Blanks	8,608	

2012 United States Senate election in Vermont
Party	Candidate	Votes	%
Independent	Bernie Sanders (incumbent)	209,053	71.04%
Republican	John MacGovern	73,198	24.87%
Marijuana	Cris Ericson	5,924	2.01%
Liberty Union	Peter Diamondstone	2,511	0.85%
Peace and Prosperity	Peter Moss	2,452	0.83%
VoteKISS	Laurel LaFramboise	877	0.30%
Write-in		252	0.09%
Total votes		294,267	100.00%
	Blanks	6,513	

2014 Vermont gubernatorial election
Primary election
Party	Candidate	Votes	%
Liberty Union	Peter Diamondstone	133	89.26%
Write-in		16	10.74%
Total votes		149	100.00%
	Blanks	52	
General election
Democratic	Peter Shumlin (incumbent)	89,509	46.36%
Republican	Scott Milne	87,075	45.10%
Libertarian	Dan Feliciano	8,428	4.37%
Independent	Em Peyton	3,157	1.64%
Liberty Union	Peter Diamondstone	1,673	0.87%
Independent	Bernard Peters	1,434	0.74%
Independent	Cris Ericson	1,089	0.56%
Write-in		722	0.37%
Total votes		193,087	100.00%
	Blanks	2,984	

2016 United States Senate election in Vermont
Party	Candidate	Votes	%
Democratic	Patrick Leahy (incumbent)	192,243	61.26%
Republican	Scott Milne	103,637	33.03%
Marijuana	Cris Ericson	9,156	2.92%
Independent	Jerry Trudell	5,223	1.66%
Liberty Union	Peter Diamondstone	3,241	1.03%
Write-in		309	0.10%
Total votes		313,809	100.00%
	Blanks/Spoiled	6,658	
