= Electoral history of Bernie Sanders =

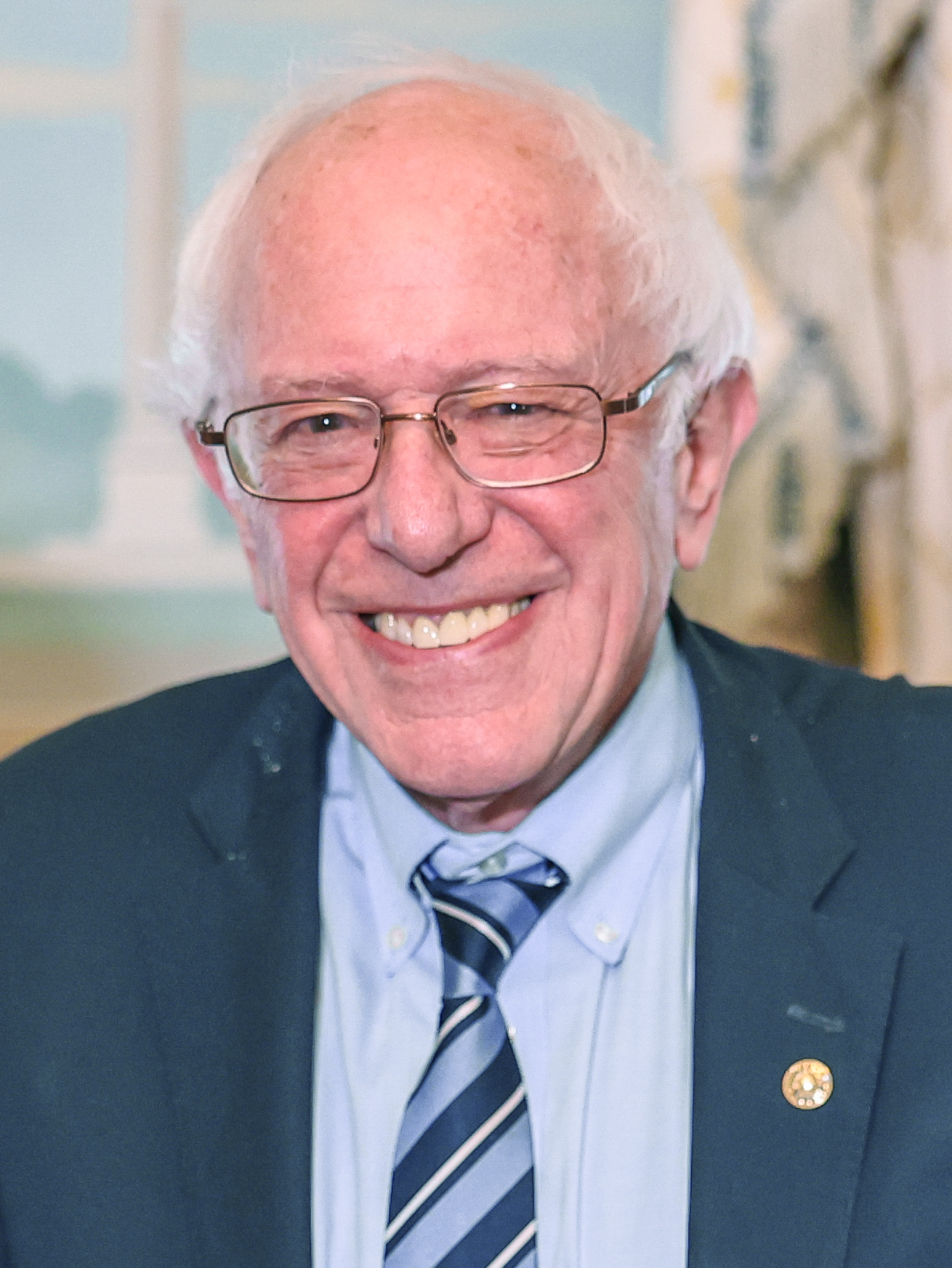
Bernie Sanders in 2023

Bernie Sanders has run for public office several times, beginning in 1972. He is an independent politician, however he caucuses with the Democratic Party, one of two major parties in the United States, and often runs in their primaries. He has served as a member of the United States Senate from Vermont since 2007. He has previously served as the United States Representative from Vermont's At-large congressional district (1991–2007), and Mayor of Burlington, Vermont (1981–1989).

== United States Senate elections (1972-1974, 2006-2024) ==
=== 1972 ===
1972 United States Senate special election in Vermont
Party	Candidate	Votes	%
Republican	Robert Stafford	45,888	64.4%
Democratic	Randolph T. Major, Jr.	23,842	33.4%
Liberty Union	Bernie Sanders	1,571	2.2%
Total votes		71,301	100.0%

=== 1974 ===
1974 United States Senate election in Vermont
Party	Candidate	Votes	%
Democratic	Patrick Leahy	70,629	49.5%
Republican	Richard W. Mallary	66,223	46.4%
Liberty Union	Bernie Sanders	5,901	4.1%
Write-in		19	0.0%
Total votes		142,772	100.0%

=== 2006 ===
2006 United States Senate Democratic primary election in Vermont
Party	Candidate	Votes	%
Democratic	Bernie Sanders	35,954	94.2%
Democratic	Louis Thabault	585	1.5%
Democratic	Craig Hill	504	1.3%
Democratic	Larry Drown	403	1.1%
Democratic	Peter Moss	385	1.0%
Democratic	Write-ins	355	0.9%
Total votes		38,186	100.0%

Bernie Sanders County 2006 results

2006 United States Senate election in Vermont
Party	Candidate	Votes	%
Independent	Bernie Sanders	171,638	65.4%
Republican	Richard Tarrant	84,924	32.3%
Marijuana	Cris Ericson	1,735	0.6%
Green	Craig Hill	1,536	0.5%
Independent	Peter Moss	1,518	0.5%
Liberty Union	Peter Diamondstone	801	0.3%
Write-in		267	0.1%
Total votes		262,419	100.0%

=== 2012 ===
2012 United States Senate Democratic primary election in Vermont
Party	Candidate	Votes	%
Democratic	Bernie Sanders (incumbent)	36,902	98.7%
Democratic	Write-ins	498	1.3%
Total votes		37,400	100.0%

Bernie Sanders County 2012 results

2012 United States Senate election in Vermont
Party	Candidate	Votes	%
Independent	Bernie Sanders (incumbent)	207,848	71.1%
Republican	John MacGovern	72,898	24.9%
Marijuana	Cris Ericson	5,924	2.0%
Liberty Union	Peter Diamondstone	2,511	0.9%
Independent	Peter Moss	2,452	0.8%
Independent	Laurel LaFramboise	877	0.3%
Write-in		252	0.1%
Total votes		292,762	100.0%

=== 2018 ===
2018 United States Senate Democratic primary election in Vermont
Party	Candidate	Votes	%
Democratic	Bernie Sanders (incumbent)	63,683	94.0%
Democratic	Folasade Adeluola	3,766	5.6%
Democratic	Write-ins	281	0.4%
Total votes		67,730	100.0%

2018 United States Senate Progressive primary election in Vermont
Party	Candidate	Votes	%
Progressive	Bernie Sanders (write-in)	434	85.3%
Progressive	Write-ins (other)	75	14.7%
Total votes		509	100.0%

Bernie Sanders County 2018 results

2018 United States Senate election in Vermont
Party	Candidate	Votes	%
Independent	Bernie Sanders (incumbent)	183,529	67.3%
Republican	Lawrence Zupan	74,663	27.4%
Independent	Brad J. Peacock	3,787	1.4%
Independent	Russell Beste	2,763	1.0%
Independent	Edward S. Gilbert, Jr.	2,244	0.8%
Independent	Folasade Adeluola	1,979	0.7%
Liberty Union	Reid Kane	1,171	0.4%
Independent	Jon Svitavsky	1,130	0.4%
Independent	Bruce Busa	914	0.3%
Write-in		294	0.1%
Total votes		272,330	100.0%

=== 2024 ===
Bernie Sanders County 2024 results

2024 United States Senate election in Vermont
Party	Candidate	Votes	%	±%
Independent	Bernie Sanders (incumbent)	229,429	63.16%	−4.28
Republican	Gerald Malloy	116,512	32.07%	+4.60
Independent	Steve Berry	7,941	2.19%	N/A
Libertarian	Matt Hill	4,530	1.25%	N/A
Green Mountain Peace and Justice	Justin Schoville	3,339	0.92%	+0.49
E.P.I.C.	Mark Stewart Greenstein	1,104	0.30%	N/A
Write-in		398	0.11%	+0.00
Total votes		363,253	100.0%	N/A
Independent hold				

== Gubernatorial elections (1972, 1976, 1986) ==
=== 1972 ===
1972 Vermont gubernatorial election
Party	Candidate	Votes	%
Democratic	Thomas P. Salmon	104,533	55.3%
Republican	Luther F. Hackett	82,491	43.6%
Liberty Union	Bernie Sanders	2,175	1.1%
Write-in		38	0.0%
Total votes		189,237	100.0%

=== 1976 ===
1976 Vermont gubernatorial election
Party	Candidate	Votes	%
Republican	Richard A. Snelling	99,268	53.4%
Democratic	Stella B. Hackel	75,262	40.4%
Liberty Union	Bernie Sanders	11,317	6.1%
Write-in		82	0.0%
Total votes		185,929	100.0%

=== 1986 ===
1986 Vermont gubernatorial election
Party	Candidate	Votes	%
Democratic	Madeleine M. Kunin (Incumbent)	92,485	47.0%
Republican	Peter Smith	75,239	38.2%
Independent	Bernie Sanders	28,418	14.4%
Liberty Union	Richard Gottlieb	491	0.2%
Write-in		83	0.0%
Total votes		196,716	100.0%

== Burlington mayoral elections (1981-1987) ==
=== 1981 ===
1981 Burlington mayoral election
Party	Candidate	Votes	%
Independent	Bernie Sanders	4,030	43.4%
Democratic	Gordon Paquette (Incumbent)	4,020	43.3%
Independent	Richard Bove	1,091	11.8%
Independent	Joe McGrath	139	1.5%
Total votes		9,280	100.0%

=== 1983 ===
1983 Burlington mayoral election
Party	Candidate	Votes	%
Independent	Bernie Sanders (Incumbent)	6,942	52.1%
Democratic	Judy Stephany	4,086	30.7%
Republican	James Gilson	2,292	17.2%
Total votes		13,320	100.0%

=== 1985 ===
1985 Burlington mayoral election
Party	Candidate	Votes	%
Independent	Bernie Sanders (Incumbent)	5,760	56.1%
Democratic	Brian D. Burns	3,275	31.9%
Independent	Diane Gallagher	1,234	12.0%
Total votes		10,269	100.0%

=== 1987 ===
1987 Burlington mayoral election
Party	Candidate	Votes	%
Independent	Bernie Sanders (Incumbent)	6,759	55.9%
Democratic	Paul Lafayette	5,335	44.1%
Total votes		12,094	100.0%

== United States House of Representatives elections (1988-2004) ==
=== 1988 ===
1988 United States House of Representatives election in Vermont
Party	Candidate	Votes	%
Republican	Peter Smith	98,937	41.2%
Independent	Bernie Sanders	90,026	37.5%
Democratic	Paul N. Poirier	45,330	18.9%
Libertarian	Jim Hedbor	3,109	1.3%
Liberty Union	Peter Diamondstone	1,455	0.6%
Independent	Morris Earle	1,070	0.4%
Write-in		161	0.1%
Total votes		240,089	100.0%

=== 1990 ===
1990 United States House of Representatives Democratic primary election in Vermont
Party	Candidate	Votes	%
Democratic	Dolores Sandoval	5,979	41.3%
Democratic	Peter Diamondstone	5,711	39.4%
Democratic	Bernie Sanders (write-in)	2,005	13.8%
Democratic	Write-ins (other)	791	5.5%
Total votes		14,486	100.0%

1990 United States House of Representatives election in Vermont
Party	Candidate	Votes	%
Independent	Bernie Sanders	117,522	56.0%
Republican	Peter Smith (Incumbent)	82,938	39.5%
Democratic	Dolores Sandoval	6,315	3.0%
Liberty Union	Peter Diamondstone	1,965	0.9%
Write-in		1,116	0.5%
Total votes		209,856	100.0%

=== 1992 ===
1992 United States House of Representatives election in Vermont
Party	Candidate	Votes	%
Independent	Bernie Sanders (incumbent)	162,724	57.8%
Republican	Tim Philbin	86,901	30.9%
Democratic	Lewis E. Young	22,279	7.9%
Liberty Union	Peter Diamondstone	3,660	1.3%
Natural Law	John Dewey	3,549	1.3%
Independent	Douglas M. Miller	2,049	0.7%
Write-in		464	0.2%
Total votes		281,626	100.0%

=== 1994 ===
1994 United States House of Representatives Democratic primary election in Vermont
Party	Candidate	Votes	%
Democratic	Bernie Sanders (write-in)	1,968	42.5%
Democratic	John Carroll (write-in)	1,458	31.5%
Democratic	Write-ins (other)	1,210	26.1%
Total votes		4,636	100.0%

1994 United States House of Representatives election in Vermont
Party	Candidate	Votes	%
Independent	Bernie Sanders (incumbent)	105,502	49.9%
Republican	John Carroll	98,523	46.6%
Natural Law	Carole Banus	2,963	1.4%
Grassroots	Jack Rogers	2,664	1.3%
Liberty Union	Annette Larson	1,493	0.7%
Write-in		304	0.1%
Total votes		211,449	100.0%

=== 1996 ===
1996 United States House of Representatives Democratic primary election in Vermont
Party	Candidate	Votes	%
Democratic	Jack Long	9,291	68.0%
Democratic	Bernie Sanders (write-in)	4,037	29.5%
Democratic	Susan Sweetser (write-in)	203	1.5%
Democratic	Write-ins (other)	143	1.1%
Total votes		13,674	100.0%

1996 United States House of Representatives election in Vermont
Party	Candidate	Votes	%
Independent	Bernie Sanders (incumbent)	140,678	55.2%
Republican	Susan Sweetser	83,021	32.5%
Democratic	Jack Long	23,830	9.3%
Libertarian	Thomas J. Morse	2,693	1.0%
Liberty Union	Peter Diamondstone	1,965	0.7%
Grassroots	Robert Melamede	1,350	0.5%
Natural Law	Norio Kushi	812	0.3%
Write-in		357	0.1%
Total votes		254,706	100.0%

=== 1998 ===
1998 United States House of Representatives Democratic primary election in Vermont
Party	Candidate	Votes	%
Democratic	Bernie Sanders (write-in)	1,661	47.9%
Democratic	Mark Candon (write-in)	524	15.1%
Democratic	Jack Long (write-in)	465	13.4%
Democratic	Peter Diamondstone (write-in)	352	10.2%
Democratic	Write-ins (other)	467	13.5%
Total votes		3,469	100.0%

1998 United States House of Representatives election in Vermont
Party	Candidate	Votes	%
Independent	Bernie Sanders (incumbent)	136,403	63.4%
Republican	Mark Candon	70,740	32.9%
Grassroots	Matthew Mulligan	3,464	1.6%
Liberty Union	Peter Diamondstone	2,153	1.0%
Libertarian	Robert Maynard	2,097	1.0%
Write-in		276	0.1%
Total votes		215,133	100.0%

=== 2000 ===
2000 United States House of Representatives Democratic primary election in Vermont
Party	Candidate	Votes	%
Democratic	Peter Diamondstone	20,539	90.9%
Democratic	Bernie Sanders (write-in)	1,337	5.9%
Democratic	Write-ins (other)	710	3.1%
Total votes		22,586	100.0%

2000 United States House of Representatives election in Vermont
Party	Candidate	Votes	%
Independent	Bernie Sanders (incumbent)	196,118	69.2%
Republican	Karen Ann Kerin	51,977	18.3%
Democratic	Peter Diamondstone	14,918	5.3%
Independent	Stewart Skrill	11,816	4.2%
Grassroots	Jack Rogers	4,799	1.7%
Libertarian	Daniel H. Krymkowski	2,978	1.0%
Write-in		760	0.3%
Total votes		283,366	100.0%

=== 2002 ===
2002 United States House of Representatives Democratic primary election in Vermont
Party	Candidate	Votes	%
Democratic	Bernie Sanders (write-in)	2,583	65.2%
Democratic	Write-ins (other)	1,382	34.9%
Total votes		3,965	100.0%

2002 United States House of Representatives election in Vermont
Party	Candidate	Votes	%
Independent	Bernie Sanders (incumbent)	144,880	64.2%
Republican	William Meub	72,813	32.2%
Liberty Union	Jane Newton	3,185	1.4%
Grassroots	Fawn Skinner	2,344	1.0%
Libertarian	Daniel H. Krymkowski	2,033	0.9%
Write-in		221	0.1%
Total votes		225,476	100.0%

=== 2004 ===
2004 United States House of Representatives Democratic primary election in Vermont
Party	Candidate	Votes	%
Democratic	Larry Drown	14,870	86.1%
Democratic	Bernie Sanders (write-in)	1,878	10.9%
Democratic	Write-ins (other)	515	3.0%
Total votes		17,263	100.0%

2004 United States House of Representatives Progressive primary election in Vermont
Party	Candidate	Votes	%
Progressive	Bernie Sanders (write-in)	315	47.2%
Progressive	Jane Newton	238	35.7%
Progressive	Write-ins (other)	114	17.1%
Total votes		667	100.0%

2004 United States House of Representatives election in Vermont
Party	Candidate	Votes	%
Independent	Bernie Sanders (incumbent)	205,774	67.5%
Republican	Greg Parke	42,271	24.4%
Democratic	Larry Drown	21,684	7.1%
Liberty Union	Jane Newton	3,018	1.0%
Write-in		261	0.1%
Total votes		305,008	100.0%

== United States presidential elections (2016-2020) ==
=== 2016 Democratic primary ===
Bernie Sanders won green states

2016 Democratic Party presidential primaries
Party	Candidate	Votes	%
Democratic	Hillary Clinton	16,849,779	55.2%
Democratic	Bernie Sanders	13,167,848	43.1%
Democratic	Martin O'Malley	110,423	0.4%
Democratic	Others	395,523	1.3%
Total votes		30,523,573	100.0%

2016 Democratic National Convention
Party	Candidate	Votes	%
Democratic	Hillary Clinton	2,842	59.7%
Democratic	Bernie Sanders	1,865	39.1%
Democratic	Abstention	56	1.2%
Total votes		4,763	100.0%

2016 United States presidential election in Vermont
Party	Candidate	Votes	%
Democratic	Hillary Clinton	178,573	55.72%
Republican	Donald Trump	95,369	29.26%
Independent	Bernie Sanders (write-in)	18,218	5.68%
Libertarian	Gary Johnson	10,078	3.14%
Green	Jill Stein	6,758	2.11%
Reform	Rocky De La Fuente	1,063	0.33%
Republican	John Kasich (write-in)	831	0.26%
Independent	Evan McMullin (write-in)	641	0.20%
Liberty Union	Gloria La Riva	327	0.10%
Constitution	Darrell Castle (write-in)	63	0.02%
Socialist	Mimi Soltysik (write-in)	3	<0.01%
Write-in	Write-ins (other)	3,143	1.00%
n/a	No Name/None of the Above	257	0.09%
n/a	Spoiled/blank	5,400	1.69%
Total votes		320,467	100.00%

=== 2020 Democratic primary ===
First-instance vote by state and territoryFirst-instance vote by state and territory Joe Biden Bernie Sanders Michael Bloomberg

2020 Democratic Party presidential primaries
Party	Candidate	Votes	%
Democratic	Joe Biden	19,076,052	51.5%
Democratic	Bernie Sanders	9,536,123	26.6%
Democratic	Elizabeth Warren	2,781,720	7.8%
Democratic	Michael Bloomberg	2,475,323	6.9%
Democratic	Pete Buttigieg	913,023	2.6%
Democratic	Amy Klobuchar	524,559	1.5%
Democratic	Tulsi Gabbard	270,792	0.8%
Democratic	Tom Steyer	258,907	0.7%
Democratic	Andrew Yang	160,416	0.4%
Democratic	Others	458,477	1.3%
Total votes		35,827,432	100.00%

2020 Democratic National Convention
Party	Candidate	Votes	%
Democratic	Joe Biden	3,558	74.9%
Democratic	Bernie Sanders	1,151	24.2%
Democratic	Available	35	0.7%
Democratic	Abstention	5	0.1%
Total votes		4,749	100.00%

== Lebanon presidential election (2025) ==
On January 9, 2025, Sanders received a single protest vote from an MP in the Lebanese presidential election. Sanders is ineligible to serve as the President of Lebanon since he is neither a Lebanese citizen nor a Maronite Christian as required by the Lebanese Constitution. The vote was excluded from the official final tally.
