= 2004 Vermont gubernatorial election =

- November 2, 2004
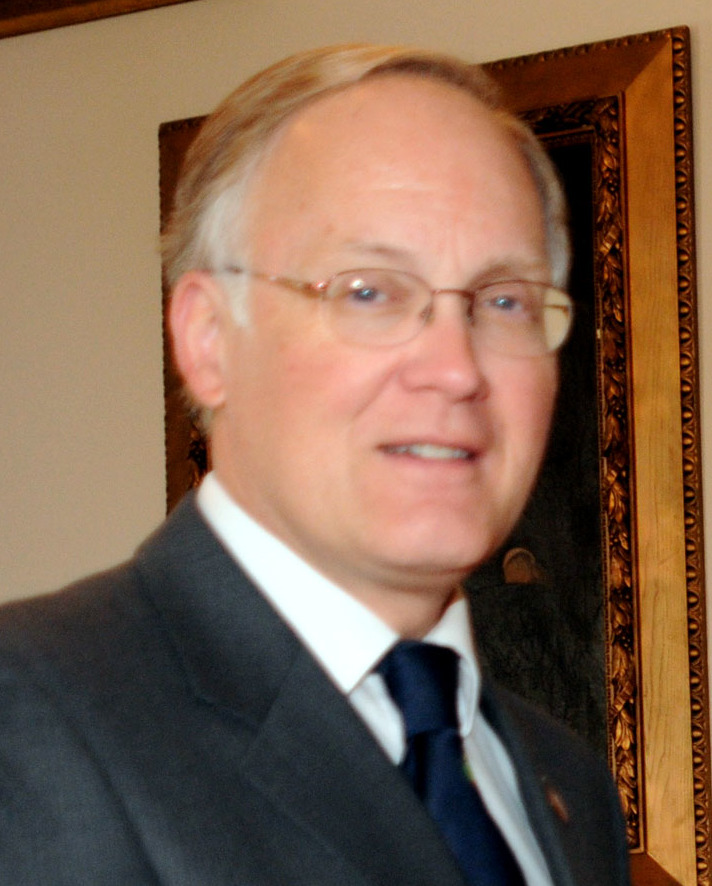

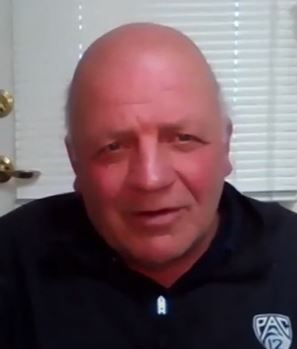
Nominee	Jim Douglas	Peter Clavelle
Party	Republican	Democratic
Alliance		Progressive
Popular vote	181,540	117,327
Percentage	58.70%	37.93%
- Douglas: 40–50% 50–60% 60–70% 70–80% 80–90% Clavelle: 40–50% 50–60% 60–70% 70–80% Tie: 50–60%
Governor before election
Jim Douglas
Republican
Elected Governor
Jim Douglas
Republican

The 2004 Vermont gubernatorial election took place November 2, 2004 for the post of Governor of Vermont. Incumbent Republican governor Jim Douglas was re-elected. Douglas defeated Peter Clavelle, the Progressive Mayor of Burlington who ran as a Democrat.

== Democratic primary ==
=== Candidates ===
- Peter Clavelle, Mayor of Burlington, switched party affiliation from Progressive to Democratic to run in this election, and was cross-nominated by the Progressive Party.

=== Results ===
Democratic primary results
Party	Candidate	Votes	%
Democratic	Peter Clavelle	23,218	94.65
Democratic	Write-ins	1,313	5.35
Total votes		24,531	100.00

== Republican primary ==
=== Candidates ===
- Jim Douglas, incumbent governor of Vermont

=== Results ===
Republican primary results
Party	Candidate	Votes	%
Republican	Jim Douglas (inc.)	15,806	98.74
Republican	Write-ins	202	1.26
Total votes		16,008	100.00

== General election ==
=== Campaign ===
Clavelle attempted to link Douglas and President George W. Bush with bumper stickers saying "Jim = George". Douglas countered this by a willingness to criticize the national Republican Party, such as over the Bush administration's environmental policies.

The two main candidates faced each other in 18 debates during the campaign.

=== Predictions ===
Source	Ranking	As of
Sabato's Crystal Ball	Likely R	November 1, 2004

=== Results ===
2004 Vermont gubernatorial election
Party	Candidate	Votes	%	±%
Republican	Jim Douglas (inc.)	181,540	58.70%	+13.76%
Democratic	Peter Clavelle (Note: Originally was a Progressive; ran in the Democratic primary, and was cross nominated by the Progressive Party.)	117,327	37.93%	−4.45%
Marijuana	Cris Ericson	4,221	1.36%	+0.61%
Independent	Patricia Hejny	2,431	0.79%	
Libertarian	Hardy Machia	2,263	0.73%	+0.32%
Liberty Union	Peter Diamondstone	1,298	0.42%	+0.15%
Write-ins	Write-ins	205	0.07%	
Majority		64,213	20.76%	+18.21%
Turnout		309,285		
Republican hold		Swing		

==== Results by county ====
County	Jim Douglas Republican		Peter Clavelle Democratic		Various candidates		Margin		Total
County	#	%	#	%	#	%	#	%	Total
Addison	11,342	61.3%	6,691	36.2%	468	2.6%	4,651	25.1%	18,501
Bennington	11,162	59.6%	6,650	35.5%	908	4.8%	4,512	24.1%	18,720
Caledonia	9,080	64.4%	4,542	32.2%	480	3.4%	4,538	32.2%	14,102
Chittenden	44,515	57.9%	30,034	39.1%	2,283	3.1%	14,481	18.8%	76,832
Essex	1,974	68.2%	793	27.4%	126	4.3%	1,181	40.8%	2,893
Franklin	13,541	68.1%	5,859	29.5%	471	2.4%	7,682	38.6%	19,871
Grand Isle	2,558	63.1%	1,363	33.6%	135	3.3%	1,195	29.5%	4,056
Lamoille	7,124	58.9%	4,532	37.4%	447	3.8%	2,592	21.5%	12,103
Orange	8,648	58.5%	5,657	38.3%	477	3.3%	2,991	20.2%	14,782
Orleans	7,709	63.3%	4,075	33.4%	404	3.4%	3,634	29.9%	12,188
Rutland	19,821	64.5%	9,951	32.4%	958	3.1%	9,870	32.1%	30,730
Washington	17,398	55.7%	13,010	41.6%	842	2.8%	4,388	14.1%	31,250
Windham	9,747	42.6%	11,886	52.0%	1,245	5.5%	-2,139	-9.4%	22,878
Windsor	16,291	55.7%	12,284	40.4%	1,174	3.8%	4,637	15.3%	30,379
Totals	181,540	58.7%	117,327	37.9%	10,418	3.4%	64,213	19.8%	309,285

Counties that flipped from Democratic to Republican

- Chittenden (largest municipality: Burlington)
- Washington (largest municipality: Barre)
- Windsor (largest municipality: Hartford)

== See also ==
- 2004 United States presidential election in Vermont
- 2004 United States Senate election in Vermont
- 2004 United States House of Representatives election in Vermont
