= 1980 United States House of Representatives election in Vermont =

- November 4, 1980
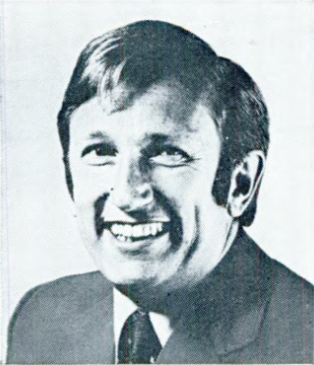

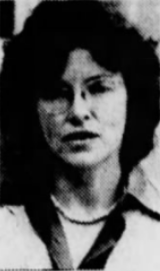

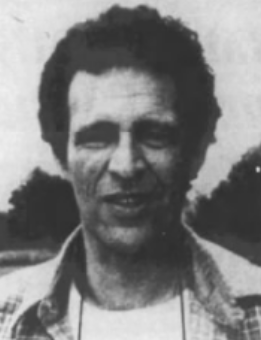
Nominee	Jim Jeffords	Robin Lloyd	Peter Diamondstone
Party	Republican	Citizens	Liberty Union
Popular vote	154,274	25,280	15,218
Percentage	79.02%	12.94%	7.79%
- Jeffords: 50–60% 60–70% 70–80% 80–90% >90%
Representative
At-large before election
Jim Jeffords
Republican
Elected Representative
At-large
Jim Jeffords
Republican

The 1980 United States House of Representatives election in Vermont was held on November 4, 1980. Republican nominee Jim Jeffords defeated Citizens Party (United States) candidate Robin Lloyd and Liberty Union Party nominee Peter Diamondstone.

== Republican primary ==
Republican primary results
Party	Candidate	Votes	%
Republican	Jim Jeffords	41,785	100.00
Total votes		41,785	100.00

== Liberty Union primary ==
Liberty Union primary results
Party	Candidate	Votes	%
Liberty Union	Peter Diamondstone	263	100.00
Total votes		263	100.00

== General election ==
Vermont's at-large congressional district election, 1980
Party	Candidate	Votes	%
Republican	Jim Jeffords (incumbent)	154,274	79.02
Citizens	Robin Lloyd	25,280	12.94
Liberty Union	Peter Diamondstone	15,218	7.79
Write-ins	N/A	447	0.23
Total votes		195,219	100.00
Republican hold			
