= 1982 United States House of Representatives election in Vermont =

1982 United States House of Representatives election in Vermont's at-large district
- November 2, 1982
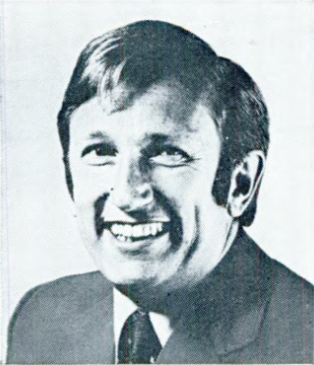

Nominee	Jim Jeffords	Mark A. Kaplan
Party	Republican	Democratic
Popular vote	114,191	38,296
Percentage	69.22%	23.23%
U.S. Representative before election
Jim Jeffords
Republican
Elected U.S. Representative
Jim Jeffords
Republican

The 1982 United States House of Representatives election in Vermont was held on Tuesday, November 2, 1982, to elect the U.S. representative from the state's at-large congressional district. The election coincided with the elections of other federal and state offices, including a U.S. Senate election.

Incumbent representative Jim Jeffords won re-election to a 5th term with 69.23% of the vote. He defeated democratic candidate, Mark Kaplan by 46 percentage points. This would be his closest election since 1976.

== Republican primary ==
Republican primary results
Party	Candidate	Votes	%
Republican	Jim Jeffords	43,090	77.93
Republican	Bill Tufts	12,030	21.76
Republican	Write-in	172	0.31
Total votes		55,292	100.00

== Democratic primary ==
Democratic primary results
Party	Candidate	Votes	%
Democratic	Mark A. Kaplan	13,272	100.00
Total votes		13,272	100.00

== General election ==
Vermont's at-large congressional district election, 1982
Party	Candidate	Votes	%
Republican	Jim Jeffords	114,191	69.23
Democratic	Mark A. Kaplan	38,296	23.22
Citizens	Robin Lloyd	6,409	3.89
Liberty Union	Peter Diamondstone	2,794	1.69
Small Is Beautiful	Morris Earle, Sr.	1,733	1.05
Write-ins	N/A	1,528	0.92
Total votes		164,951	100.00
