= 1986 United States House of Representatives election in Vermont =

1986 United States House of Representatives election in Vermont's at-large district
- November 4, 1986
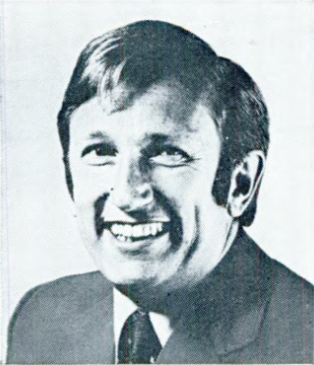
Nominee	Jim Jeffords
Party	Republican
Popular vote	168,403
Percentage	89.24%
- Jeffords: 60–70% 70–80% 80–90% >90%
U.S. Representative before election
Jim Jeffords
Republican
Elected U.S. Representative
Jim Jeffords
Republican

The 1986 United States House of Representatives election in Vermont was held on Tuesday, November 4, 1986, to elect the U.S. representative from the state's at-large congressional district. The election coincided with the elections of other federal and state offices, including an election to the U.S. Senate

Incumbent Republican Jim Jeffords easily won re-election with 89.2% of the vote. Democrats did not run a candidate for this seat. As of 2024 this is the last time a Republican won every county in a Vermont House election.

== Republican primary ==
=== Candidates ===
- Jim Jeffords, incumbent representative since 1975.

Republican primary results
Party	Candidate	Votes	%
Republican	Jim Jeffords	26,133	100.00
Total votes		26,133	100.00

== Liberty Union primary ==
Liberty Union primary results
Party	Candidate	Votes	%
Liberty Union	Peter Diamondstone	149	100.00
Total votes		149	100.00

== General election ==
Vermont's at-large congressional district election, 1986
Party	Candidate	Votes	%
Republican	Jim Jeffords	168,403	89.24
pro-life	John T. McNulty	7,404	3.92
Liberty Union	Annette Larson	7,060	3.74
Independent politician	Morris Earle	5,850	3.10
Total votes		188,717	100.00
Republican hold			
