= 2016 United States presidential election in Vermont =

- November 8, 2016
- Turnout: 67.95% ▲

Nominee	Hillary Clinton	Donald Trump	Bernie Sanders (write-in)
Party	Democratic	Republican	Independent
Home state	New York	New York	Vermont
Running mate	Tim Kaine	Mike Pence	None
Electoral vote	3	0	0
Popular vote	178,573	95,369	18,218
Percentage	55.72%	29.76%	5.68%

Clinton
40–50%
50–60%
60–70%
70–80%
80–90%
Trump
40–50%
50–60%
60–70%
Tie/No data
President before election
Barack Obama
Democratic
Elected President
Donald Trump
Republican

Treemap of the popular vote by county.

The 2016 United States presidential election in Vermont was held on November 8, 2016, as part of the 2016 United States presidential election in which all 50 states plus the District of Columbia participated. Vermont voters chose three electors to represent them in the Electoral College via a popular vote pitting the Republican Party's nominee, businessman Donald Trump, and his running mate Indiana Governor Mike Pence, against the Democratic Party's nominee, former U.S. Secretary of State Hillary Clinton, and her running mate, Virginia Senator Tim Kaine. Independent Vermont Senator Bernie Sanders received a number of unsolicited write-in votes.

Clinton won Vermont with 55.7% of the vote and a vote margin of 25.9%, a substantial decline from Barack Obama's 35.6% margin in 2012. Trump received 29.8% of the vote statewide and carried Essex County—the most rural and sparsely populated county in the state, thus making him the first Republican presidential candidate to win a county in Vermont since George W. Bush in 2004.

After voting Republican in all but one election from 1856 to 1988, Vermont has since become one of the most reliably Democratic strongholds in the nation. In 2016, Trump became only the second Republican, after George W. Bush, to win the White House without carrying Vermont.

Vermont Senator and Democratic primary candidate Bernie Sanders, who had endorsed Clinton after she won the primary, received 5.7% of the vote through write-ins, the highest write-in draft campaign percentage for a statewide presidential candidate in history. Libertarian nominee Gary Johnson, received 3.1%, and Green Party nominee Jill Stein received 2.1%. Trump's 29.76% vote share is the worst for a Republican presidential nominee in Vermont history.

== Primary elections ==
On March 1, 2016, in the presidential primaries, Vermont voters expressed their preferences for the Democratic, Republican, and Libertarian parties. Voters who were unaffiliated chose any 1 primary in which to vote.

=== Democratic primary ===
The 2016 Vermont Democratic primary took place on March 1 as one of the Democratic Party's primaries ahead of the 2016 presidential election.

On the same day, dubbed "Super Tuesday," Democratic primaries were held in 10 other states plus American Samoa, while the Republican Party held primaries in 11 states including their own Vermont primary.

As Sanders was an extremely popular favorite son, there was no campaign to speak of and all pledged delegates were given to Sanders, due to Clinton getting less than 15% of the popular vote. Sanders won every municipality in the state.

=== Republican primary ===
Vermont Republican primary, March 1, 2016
Candidate	Votes	Percentage	Actual delegate count		
Candidate	Votes	Percentage	Bound	Unbound	Total
Donald Trump	19,974	32.34%	8	0	8
John Kasich	18,534	30.01%	8	0	8
Marco Rubio	11,781	19.08%	0	0	0
Ted Cruz	5,932	9.61%	0	0	0
Ben Carson	2,551	4.13%	0	0	0
Jeb Bush (withdrawn)	1,106	1.79%	0	0	0
Rand Paul (withdrawn)	423	0.68%	0	0	0
Chris Christie (withdrawn)	361	0.58%	0	0	0
Carly Fiorina (withdrawn)	212	0.34%	0	0	0
Rick Santorum (withdrawn)	164	0.27%	0	0	0
Unprojected delegates:			0	0	0
Total:	61,756	100.00%	16	0	16
Source: The Green Papers

== General election ==
=== Predictions ===
Source	Ranking	As of
Los Angeles Times	Safe D	November 6, 2016
CNN	Safe D	November 4, 2016
Cook Political Report	Safe D	November 7, 2016
Electoral-vote.com	Safe D	November 8, 2016
Rothenberg Political Report	Safe D	November 7, 2016
Sabato's Crystal Ball	Safe D	November 7, 2016
RealClearPolitics	Safe D	November 8, 2016
Fox News	Safe D	November 7, 2016

=== Polling ===
Hillary Clinton won every poll pre-election by double digits. Interestingly, she only reached 50% in the last poll, leading 50% to 22%, which may have indicated support for writing in Bernie Sanders or other third-party candidates. The average of the final three polls showed Hillary Clinton leading Trump 48% to 22%.

=== Results ===
2016 United States presidential election in Vermont
Party	Candidate	Votes	%
Democratic	Hillary Clinton	178,573	55.72%
Republican	Donald Trump	95,369	29.76%
Independent	Bernie Sanders (write-in)	18,218	5.68%
Libertarian	Gary Johnson	10,078	3.14%
Green	Jill Stein	6,758	2.11%
Reform	Rocky De La Fuente	1,063	0.33%
Republican	John Kasich (write-in)	831	0.26%
Independent	Evan McMullin (write-in)	641	0.20%
Liberty Union	Gloria La Riva	327	0.10%
Constitution	Darrell Castle (write-in)	63	0.02%
Socialist	Mimi Soltysik (write-in)	3	<0.01%
Write-in	Other Write-in	3,143	1.00%
n/a	No Name/None of the Above	257	0.09%
n/a	Spoiled/blank	5,400	1.69%
Total votes		320,467	100.00%
Democratic win			

Extended content
	Other Write-ins	Candidate	Votes	Percentage
	Republican	Mike Pence (write-in)	305	0.09%
	Republican	Paul Ryan (write-in)	209	0.06%
	Republican	Mitt Romney (write-in)	122	0.04%
	Republican	Marco Rubio (write-in)	93	0.03%
	Republican	Jeb Bush (write-in)	79	0.03%
	Republican	John McCain (write-in)	76	0.03%
	Republican	Ted Cruz (write-in)	63	0.02%
	Libertarian	Ron Paul (write-in)	25	0.02%
	Republican	Colin Powell (write-in)	25	0.02%
	Democratic	Martin O'Malley (write-in)	6	<0.01%
	n/a	Write-in (Other)	2,140	0.72%

==== By county ====
County	Hillary Clinton Democratic		Donald Trump Republican		Various candidates Other parties		Margin		Total votes cast
County	#	%	#	%	#	%	#	%	Total votes cast
Addison	11,219	58.95%	5,297	27.83%	2,515	13.22%	5,922	31.12%	19,031
Bennington	9,539	54.88%	5,925	34.09%	1,917	11.03%	3,614	20.79%	17,381
Caledonia	6,445	45.79%	5,534	39.32%	2,095	14.89%	911	6.47%	14,074
Chittenden	54,814	65.71%	18,601	22.30%	10,001	11.99%	36,213	43.41%	83,416
Essex	1,019	34.84%	1,506	51.49%	400	13.67%	-487	-16.65%	2,925
Franklin	9,351	43.67%	8,752	40.88%	3,308	15.45%	599	2.79%	21,411
Grand Isle	2,094	50.96%	1,487	36.19%	528	12.85%	607	14.77%	4,109
Lamoille	7,241	56.74%	3,570	27.97%	1,951	15.29%	3,671	28.77%	12,762
Orange	7,541	51.48%	5,007	34.18%	2,101	14.34%	2,534	17.30%	14,649
Orleans	5,185	43.04%	5,159	42.83%	1,702	14.13%	26	0.21%	12,046
Rutland	13,635	46.04%	12,479	42.14%	3,501	11.82%	1,156	3.90%	29,615
Washington	18,594	59.81%	7,993	25.71%	4,499	14.48%	10,601	34.10%	31,086
Windham	14,340	63.36%	5,454	24.10%	2,840	12.54%	8,886	39.26%	22,634
Windsor	17,556	58.66%	8,605	28.75%	3,767	12.59%	8,951	29.91%	29,928
Totals	178,573	56.68%	95,369	30.27%	41,125	13.05%	83,204	26.41%	315,067

Counties that flipped from Democratic to Republican

- Essex (largest town: Lunenburg)

==== By congressional district ====
Due to the state's low population, only one congressional district is allocated. This district, called the at-large district because it covers the entire state, is thus equivalent to the statewide election results.

District	Trump	Clinton	Representative
At-large	29.76%	55.72%	Peter Welch

== See also ==
- United States presidential elections in Vermont
- 2016 Democratic Party presidential debates and forums
- 2016 Democratic Party presidential primaries
- 2016 Republican Party presidential debates and forums
- 2016 Republican Party presidential primaries
