= 1990 United States House of Representatives election in Vermont =

- November 6, 1990
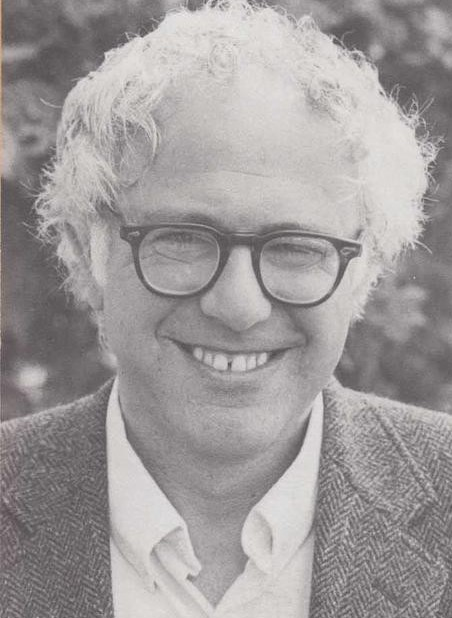

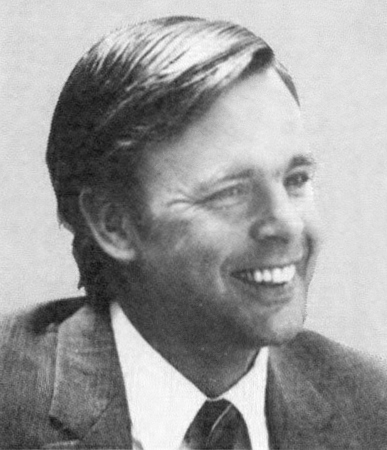
Nominee	Bernie Sanders	Peter Plympton Smith
Party	Independent	Republican
Popular vote	117,522	82,938
Percentage	56.00%	39.52%
- Sanders 40–50% 50–60% 60–70% 70–80% 80–90% Smith 40–50% 50–60% 60–70%
Representative
At-large before election
Peter Plympton Smith
Republican
Elected Representative
At-large
Bernie Sanders
Independent

The 1990 United States House of Representatives election in Vermont was held on Tuesday, November 6, 1990, to elect the U.S. representative from the state's at-large congressional district. The election coincided with the elections of other federal and state offices.

Independent Bernie Sanders, the former mayor of Burlington, defeated incumbent Republican Peter Plympton Smith.

== Republican primary ==
=== Candidates ===
==== Nominee ====
- Peter Plympton Smith, incumbent U.S. Representative

==== Eliminated in primary ====
- Timothy Philbin, insurance agent

=== Endorsements ===
Timothy Philbin

Organizations

- NRA Political Victory Fund

=== Results ===
Republican primary results
Party	Candidate	Votes	%
Republican	Peter Plympton Smith (incumbent)	27,339	60.31
Republican	Timothy Philbin	17,444	38.48
Republican	Write-ins	550	1.21
Total votes		45,333	100.00

== Democratic primary ==
=== Candidates ===
==== Nominee ====
- Dolores Sandoval, professor at the University of Vermont

==== Eliminated in primary ====
- Peter Diamondstone, socialist activist and perennial candidate
- Bernie Sanders, former Mayor of Burlington, Vermont (write-in)

==== Declined ====
- Peter Welch, state senator

==== Results ====
Democratic primary results
Party	Candidate	Votes	%
Democratic	Dolores Sandoval	5,979	41.27
Democratic	Peter Diamondstone	5,711	39.42
Democratic	Bernie Sanders (write-in)	2,005	13.84
Democratic	Other write-ins	791	5.46
Total votes		14,486	100.00

== Libertarian primary ==
Libertarian primary results
Party	Candidate	Votes	%
Libertarian	Write-ins	127	100.00
Total votes		127	100.00

== General election ==
Smith, a liberal Republican, was considered to have acquitted himself well in his first congressional term, and The Washington Post noted that under most circumstances he would have been considered safely assured of re-election. However, the presence of Sanders, who was well known in Vermont and who was considered more famous than Smith, meant that he faced a tough re-election battle. Sanders, a democratic socialist, had narrowly lost to Smith in 1988, which was widely attributed to the presence of a strong Democratic candidate in the form of Vermont House Majority Leader Paul N. Poirier. No such event occurred during the 1990 cycle, as the Democratic nominee, Professor Dolores Sandoval, held positions to the left of Sanders on several issues, with her advocating for the legalization of heroin. Smith received the support of some Democrats including Poirier, former Speaker of the State House Timothy J. O'Connor, and former Governor Thomas P. Salmon. Other Democrats, including former governor Philip H. Hoff and Peter Welch, who was the runner-up to Poirier in the Democratic primary in 1988 and was the party's nominee for governor in the concurrent gubernatorial election, backed Sanders.

Smith had an advantage in the polls until March 1990, when he backed a series of bills designed to alleviate the savings and loan crisis, including a bailout bill and a bill that cut funding for social programs. Sanders used Smith's support for these plans to tie him to President George H. W. Bush, who was unpopular in Vermont, and to portray him as overly supportive of the rich. Smith also faced backlash from voters for his support for extensive restrictions on guns, which earned him the enmity of several gun rights organizations. These organizations turned to Sanders as the only viable alternative even though his positions on guns were not radically different from Smith's. Feeling that he was losing ground in the race, Smith ran an ad campaign attempting to tie Sanders to left-wing authoritarian regimes such as Cuba, and attacking him for his self-declared democratic socialist views. This decision backfired, as Smith's tactics were denounced as "red-baiting" and "McCarthyism" in the press, and many Smith backers voiced their displeasure with the campaign.

Ultimately, Sanders defeated Smith in a landslide, claiming 56% of the vote to Smith's 39.5%. Sandoval was a nonfactor, receiving just over 3% of the vote.

=== Endorsements ===
Bernie Sanders (I)

State officials

- Sally Conrad, state senator (Democratic)
- Timothy R. Corcoran, state representative (Democratic)
- Philip H. Hoff, former Governor of Vermont (Democratic)
- John F. Murphy Sr., state representative (Democratic)
- Michael J. Obuchowski, state representative (Democratic)
- Peter Welch, former state senator; Democratic nominee for Governor of Vermont in 1990 (Democratic)

Individuals

- Jeffrey P. Weaver, political strategist

Labor unions

- AFL-CIO
- National Education Association
- United Auto Workers Vermont
- United Electrical, Radio and Machine Workers of America

Organizations

- Environmental Action
- NRA Political Victory Fund

Newspapers and publications

- Rutland Herald
Peter Smith (R)

Executive officials

- George H. W. Bush, President of the United States

State officials

- Deane C. Davis, former Governor of Vermont
- Stephan A. Morse, former Speaker of the Vermont House of Representatives
- Timothy J. O'Connor, former Speaker of the Vermont House of Representatives (Democratic)
- Paul N. Poirier, former Majority Leader of the Vermont House of Representatives; Democratic nominee for VT-AL in 1988 (Democratic)
- Thomas P. Salmon, former Governor of Vermont (Democratic)

Organizations

- League of Conservation Voters
- NARAL Pro-Choice America
- Sierra Club
- WEZF

Newspapers and publications

- Brattleboro Reformer
- St. Albans Messenger
- The Burlington Free Press
- The Caledonian-Record

=== Results ===
Vermont's at-large congressional district election, 1990
Party	Candidate	Votes	%
Independent	Bernie Sanders	117,522	56.00
Republican	Peter Plympton Smith (incumbent)	82,938	39.52
Democratic	Dolores Sandoval	6,315	3.01
Liberty Union	Peter Diamondstone	1,965	0.94
Write-ins	N/A	1,116	0.53
Total votes		209,856	100.00
Independent gain from Republican			
