= 2006 United States Senate election in Vermont =

- November 7, 2006
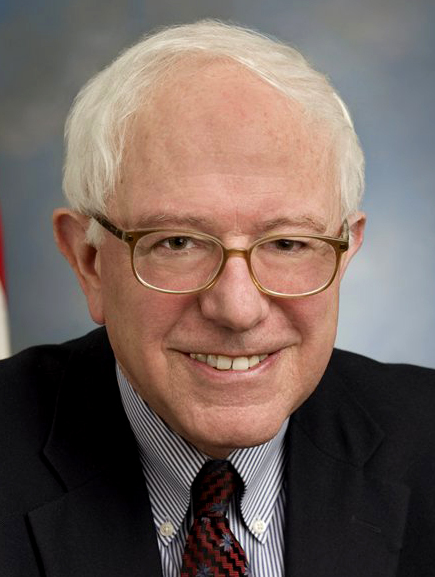

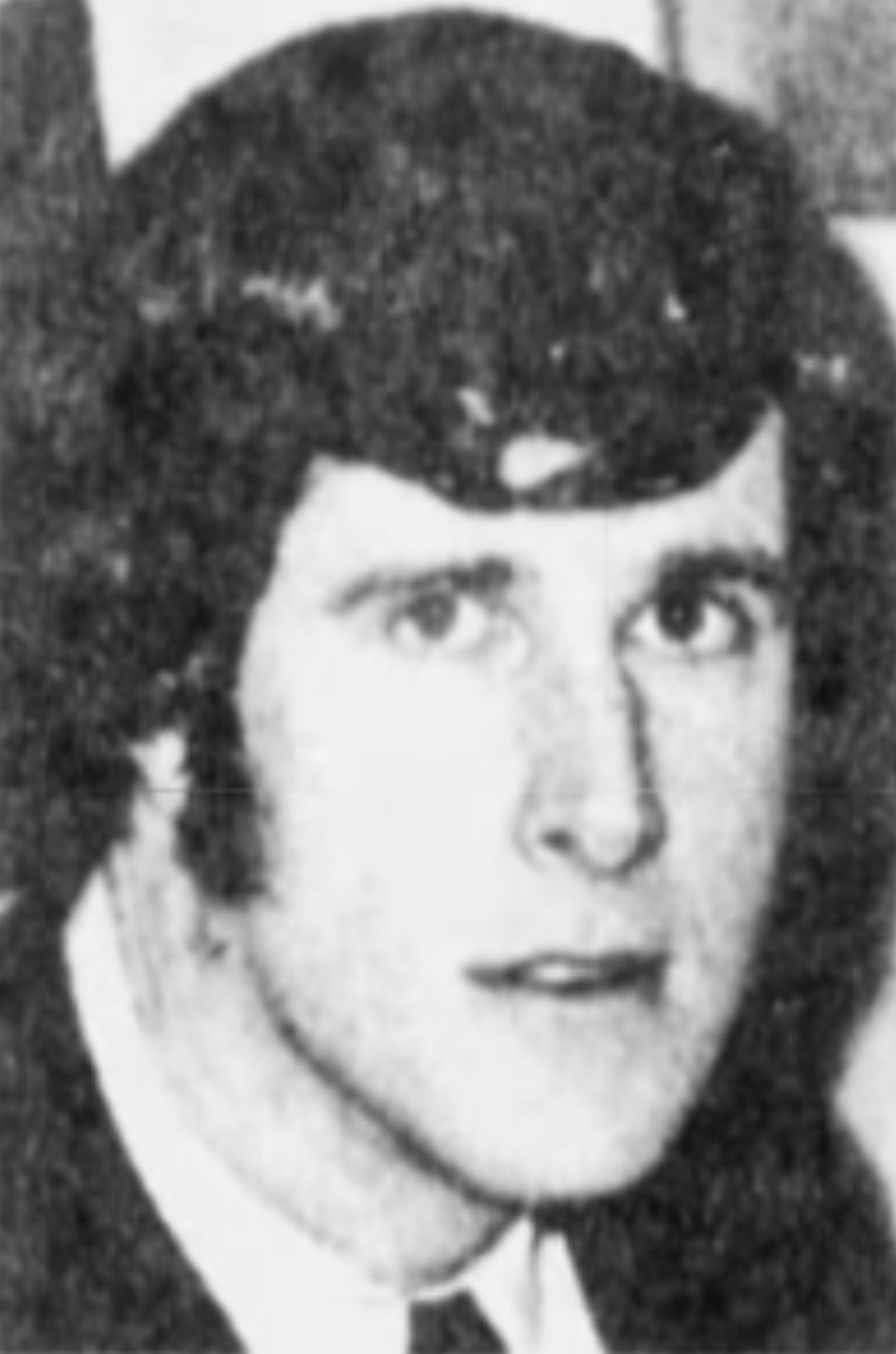
Nominee	Bernie Sanders	Richard Tarrant
Party	Independent	Republican
Alliance	Democratic
Popular vote	171,638	84,924
Percentage	65.41%	32.36%
- Sanders: 40–50% 50–60% 60–70% 70–80% 80–90% Tarrant: 50–60% Tie: 40–50%
U.S. senator before election
Jim Jeffords
Independent
Elected U.S. Senator
Bernie Sanders
Independent

The 2006 United States Senate election in Vermont was held November 7, 2006. Incumbent independent Senator Jim Jeffords decided to retire rather than seek reelection to a fourth term, and Bernie Sanders was elected to succeed him.

Sanders, who represented Vermont's at-large House district as an independent, won the Democratic primary, and then dropped out to run as an independent. Many Democratic politicians across the country endorsed him, and no Democrat was on the ballot. The state committee of the Vermont Democratic Party voted unanimously to endorse Sanders.

Sanders won the seat with 65% of the vote. His win marked the first Republican loss in an election for this Class 1 seat since 1850, decisively ending the longest single-party Senate winning streak in history. (Vermont's Class 3 seat had been held by Democrat Patrick Leahy since 1974, the first time a Republican had lost any Senate election in the state since 1850.)

== Democratic primary ==
After Jeffords retired, there was brief speculation that DNC chair Howard Dean, a former governor and 2004 presidential candidate, would run for Senate. After Dean quickly issued a statement that he would not run, independent Representative Bernie Sanders became the subject of media attention, and ultimately entered and won the race.

=== Candidates ===
==== Declared ====
- Larry Drown, retired plumber and perennial candidate
- Peter D. Moss, retired chemical engineer
- Louis W. Thabault, former postal worker
- Bernie Sanders, U.S. Representative and Liberty Union nominee for U.S. Senate in 1972

==== Declined ====
- Howard Dean, former Governor of Vermont, chair of the Democratic National Committee
- Doug Racine, former Lieutenant Governor of Vermont

=== Results ===
Sanders won the Democratic primary, but declined the nomination, leaving no Democratic nominee on the ballot. This victory ensured that no Democrat would appear on the general election ballot to split the vote with Sanders, an ally of the Democrats who had been supported by leaders in the Democratic Party.

Democratic primary results
Party	Candidate	Votes	%
Democratic	Bernie Sanders	35,954	94.15
Democratic	Louis W. Thabault	585	1.53
Democratic	Craig Hill	504	1.32
Democratic	Larry Drown	403	1.05
Democratic	Peter Moss	384	1.00
Democratic	Write-ins	355	0.93
Total votes		38,186	100.0

== Republican primary ==
National Republicans pressured Lieutenant Governor Brian Dubie to enter the race, and he formed an exploratory committee to do so, but the committee raised little money and Dubie opted not to run. Governor Jim Douglas also declined to run.

Businessman Richard Tarrant announced his campaign in October 2005. Tarrant largely self-funded his campaign, and frequently denounced political partisanship.

=== Candidates ===
- Cris Ericson, perennial candidate and marijuana legalization activist
- Greg Parke, retired U.S. Air Force lieutenant colonel and nominee for VT-AL in 2004
- Richard Tarrant, businessman

=== Declined ===
- Jim Douglas, governor of Vermont
- Brian Dubie, lieutenant governor of Vermont

=== Endorsements ===
Greg Parke

Organizations

- Swift Vets and POWs for Truth
Richard Tarrant

State officials

- Jim Douglas, Governor of Vermont
- Walter E. Freed, former Speaker of the Vermont House of Representatives

Individuals

- Tom Brennan, basketball coach

=== Results ===
Republican primary
Party	Candidate	Votes	%
Republican	Richard Tarrant	22,008	61.84
Republican	Greg Parke	10,479	29.44
Republican	Cris Ericson	1,722	4.84
Republican	Write-ins	1,382	3.88
Total votes		35,591	100.00

== General election ==
=== Candidates ===
- Peter Diamondstone (Liberty Union), socialist activist and perennial candidate
- Cris Ericson (Independent)
- Craig Hill (Green), electronics marketer
- Peter Moss (Independent)
- Bernie Sanders (Independent), U.S. Representative from VT-AL
- Richard Tarrant (Republican), businessman

=== Campaign ===
In mid-August 2006, the campaign heated up considerably, with Tarrant fully engaged in heavy media advertising, most of which criticized Sanders's public stances. Tarrant ran several ads accusing Sanders of representing himself differently from his voting record in the House of Representatives, citing such examples as Sanders's votes against Amber alert and against increased penalties for child pornography. Sanders responded with an ad stating that Tarrant's claims were "dishonest" and "distort my record", and presented what he viewed as more accurate explanations of his voting record.

Tarrant also claimed that Sanders's election would lead to an exodus of businesses from Vermont. Sanders based his campaign on a well-tested message of fixing economic inequality, and ran a positive campaign that took advantage of his high name recognition in the state.

=== Endorsements ===
Bernie Sanders (I)

Federal officials

- Barack Obama, U.S. Senator from Illinois
- Harry Reid, U.S. Senator from Nevada
- Chuck Schumer, U.S. Senator from New York

State officials

- Howard Dean, former Governor of Vermont; Chair of the Democratic National Committee

Individuals

- Jon Fishman, drummer
- Mike Gordon, bass guitarist
- Willie Nelson, musician and activist
- Grace Potter, singer
- Kesha Ram, student
- Jeffrey P. Weaver, political staffer

Organizations

- Democracy for America
- MoveOn

Newspapers and publications

- Addison County Independent
- Brattleboro Reformer
- Esquire
- Stowe Reporter
- The Chronicle
- Vermont Woman
Richard Tarrant (R)

Federal officials

- John McCain, U.S. Senator from Arizona

State officials

- Jim Douglas, Governor of Vermont
- Walter E. Freed, former Speaker of the Vermont House of Representatives

Individuals

- Tom Brennan, basketball coach

=== Fund-raising ===
The election was the most expensive political campaign in Vermont history.

Tarrant was a self-funded candidate, with 98% of all his campaign expenditures coming from personal sources. He spent $7,315,854 total. Sanders' top contributors include the plaintiffs' law firm Baron & Budd; the International Union of Operating Engineers; the Laborers' International Union of North America; and the Communication Workers of America. Sanders raised $5,554,466 total. In total, Tarrant and Sanders spent $13,771,060. Tarrant spent $85 per vote, the largest cost per vote of any race in the country during 2006, while Sanders spent $34 per vote.

=== Debates ===
2006 United States Senate election in Vermont Debate
No.	Date	Host	Moderator	Link	Participants	
P Participant A Absent N Non-invitee I Invitee W Withdrawn						
P Participant A Absent N Non-invitee I Invitee W Withdrawn					Richard Tarrant	Bernie Sanders
1	October 23, 2006	C-SPAN	Thom Hallock	C-SPAN	P	P

=== Predictions ===
Source	Ranking	As of
The Cook Political Report	Likely I	November 6, 2006
Sabato's Crystal Ball	Solid I	November 6, 2006
Rothenberg Political Report	Solid I	November 6, 2006
RealClearPolitics	Solid I	November 6, 2006

=== Polling ===
Source	Date	Bernie Sanders (I)	Richard Tarrant (R)
Research 2000	November 1, 2005	64%	16%
Rasmussen	January 5, 2006	70%	25%
Doyle Poll	March 7, 2006	62%	26%
Research 2000	May 11, 2006	61%	24%
Rasmussen	June 16, 2006	67%	29%
American Research Group	July 27, 2006	56%	35%
Rasmussen	August 3, 2006	62%	34%
American Research Group	September 15, 2006	55%	40%
Research 2000	September 18–19, 2006	58%	33%
Rasmussen	September 24, 2006	64%	32%
Research 2000	October 23–24, 2006	57%	36%

=== Results ===
Official results from the Vermont United States Senate. Sanders won a majority of the votes in every county in the state, with 57% as his lowest county total, flipping every county, and all but 2 townships.

2006 United States Senate election in Vermont
Party	Candidate	Votes	%	±%
Independent	Bernie Sanders	171,638	65.41%	N/A
Republican	Richard Tarrant	84,924	32.36%	−33.20%
Independent	Cris Ericson	1,735	0.66%	N/A
Green	Craig Hill	1,536	0.59%	N/A
Independent	Peter D. Moss	1,518	0.58%	N/A
Liberty Union	Peter Diamondstone	801	0.31%	−0.21%
Write-in		267	0.10%	N/A
Total votes		262,419	100.00%	N/A
Independent hold				

==== By county ====
County	Bernie Sanders Independent		Richard Tarrant Republican		Various candidates Other parties	
County	#	%	#	%	#	%
Addison	11,257	68.91%	4,834	29.59%	244	1.5%
Bennington	8,865	61.57%	4,844	33.64%	689	4.79%
Caledonia	7,414	60.95%	4,472	36.76%	279	2.29%
Chittenden	42,861	64.64%	22,603	34.09%	842	1.27%
Essex	1,480	58.66%	925	36.66%	118	4.68%
Franklin	10,830	61.8%	6,406	36.56%	288	1.64%
Grand Isle	2,174	59.32%	1,423	38.83%	68	1.85%
Lamoille	7,183	68.62%	3,106	29.67%	179	1.51%
Orange	8,426	67.9%	3,667	29.55%	317	2.55%
Orleans	6,456	62.18%	3,690	35.54%	237	2.28%
Rutland	15,629	61.21%	9,282	36.35%	622	2.44%
Washington	18,760	68.93%	7,934	29.15%	522	1.92%
Windham	13,245	71.27%	4,613	24.82%	726	3.91%
Windsor	17,058	68.48%	7,125	28.6%	726	2.92%
Totals	171,638	65.41%	84,924	32.36%	5,857	2.23%

Counties that flipped from Republican to Independent

- All 14

== See also ==
- 2006 United States Senate elections
