= 2004 United States House of Representatives election in Vermont =

2004 United States House of Representatives election in Vermont's at-large district
- November 2, 2004
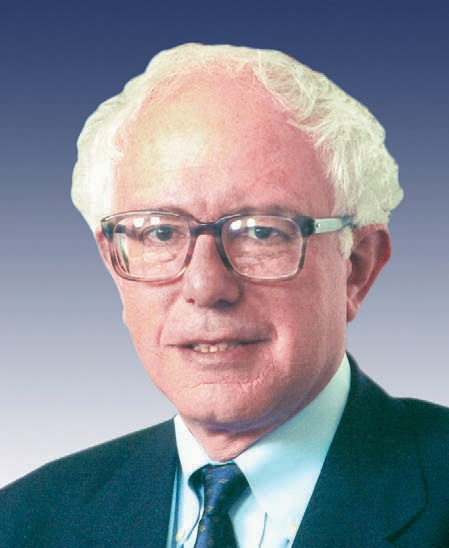

Nominee	Bernie Sanders	Greg Parke	Larry Drown
Party	Independent	Republican	Democratic
Popular vote	205,774	74,271	21,684
Percentage	67.46%	24.35%	7.11%
- Sanders: 40–50% 50–60% 60–70% 70–80% 80–90% Parke: 40–50% 50–60%
U.S. Representative before election
Bernie Sanders
Independent
Elected U.S. Representative
Bernie Sanders
Independent

The 2004 United States House of Representatives election in Vermont was held on Tuesday, November 2, 2004, to elect the U.S. representative from the state's at-large congressional district. The election coincided with the elections of other federal and state offices, including a quadrennial presidential election and an election to the U.S. Senate.

Incumbent Independent Bernie Sanders won re-election to his eighth and final term in the House of Representatives, defeating Republican Greg Parke and Democrat Larry Drown. Sanders would run for and be elected to the United States Senate in 2006, a seat he still holds today.

As of 2024, this is the last time someone who was not a member of the Democratic or Republican party was elected to the House of Representatives.

== General election ==
=== Candidates ===
- Larry Drown (Democratic)
- Jane Newton (Liberty Union)
- Gregory "Greg" Tarl Parke, former United States Air Force lieutenant colonel (Republican)
- Bernie Sanders, incumbent U.S. Representative (Independent)

=== Predictions ===
Source	Ranking	As of
The Cook Political Report	Safe I	October 29, 2004
Sabato's Crystal Ball	Safe I	November 1, 2004

=== Controversy ===
On Friday, October 29, 2004, the Parke campaign aired a radio ad which portrayed Sanders as being on friendly terms with pornographers, pedophiles, illegal immigrations and terrorists. The ad was pulled the same day that it first aired. Parke was criticized for his actions by both the state chairman of the Vermont Republican Party James Barnett and Vermont Lieutenant Governor Brian Dubie, as well as by other Vermont Republicans.

Parke had earlier blamed Sanders for the September 11 terrorist attacks based on Sanders's prior vote to cut the intelligence budget.

=== Results ===
Sanders won every county and carried all but two municipalities in the state, with Parke winning the towns of Stratton and Granby.

Vermont's at-large congressional district election, 2004
Party	Candidate	Votes	%
Independent	Bernie Sanders (incumbent)	205,774	67.46%
Republican	Greg Parke	74,271	24.35%
Democratic	Larry Drown	21,684	7.11%
Liberty Union	Jane Newton	3,018	0.99%
Write-ins	N/A	261	0.09%
Total votes		305,008	100.00
Independent hold			

==== Results by county ====
County	Bernie Sanders Independent		Greg Parke Republican		Larry Drown Democratic		Various candidates		Margin		Total
County	#	%	#	%	#	%	#	%	#	%	Total
Addison	12,632	69.1%	4,543	24.9%	980	5.4%	117	0.6%	8,089	44.2%	18,272
Bennington	10,717	58.2%	5,107	27.7%	2,236	12.1%	347	1.9%	5,610	1.9%	18,407
Caledonia	9,060	65.2%	3,853	27.7%	850	6.1%	129	0.9%	5,207	37.5%	13,892
Chittenden	53,808	71.3%	16,598	22.0%	4,590	6.1%	465	0.6%	37,210	49.3%	75,461
Essex	1,637	57.5%	850	29.9%	315	11.1%	44	1.5%	787	27.6%	2,846
Franklin	14,055	71.8%	4,328	22.1%	1,052	5.4%	142	0.7%	9,727	49.7%	19,577
Grand Isle	2,820	70.7%	949	23.8%	198	5.0%	21	0.5%	1,871	42.9%	3,988
Lamoille	8,600	72.3%	2,550	21.4%	675	5.7%	77	0.6%	6,050	50.9%	11,902
Orange	9,734	66.6%	3,698	25.3%	1,054	7.2%	122	0.8%	6,036	41.3%	14,608
Orleans	8,406	69.8%	2,875	23.9%	672	5.6%	93	0.8%	5,531	42.9%	12,046
Rutland	17,589	58.1%	10,152	33.6%	2,202	7.3%	314	1.0%	7,437	24.5%	30,257
Washington	22,412	72.6%	6,535	21.2%	1,679	5.4%	234	0.8%	15,877	51.4%	30,860
Windham	14,578	64.5%	5,053	22.4%	2,413	10.7%	552	2.4%	9,525	42.1%	22,596
Windsor	19,726	65.7%	7,180	23.9%	2,768	9.2%	361	1.2%	12,546	41.8%	30,035
Totals	205,774	67.5%	74,271	24.4%	21,684	7.1%	3,279	1.1%	131,503	43.1%	305,008
