= 1994 Vermont gubernatorial election =

- November 8, 1994
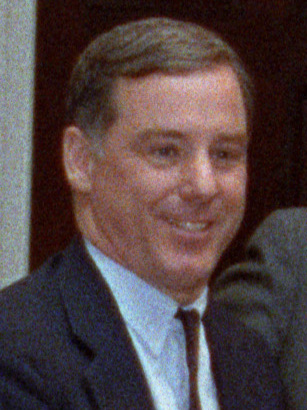

Nominee	Howard Dean	David F. Kelley	Thomas J. Morse
Party	Democratic	Republican	Independent
Popular vote	145,661	40,292	15,000
Percentage	68.69%	19.00%	7.07%
- Dean: 30–40% 40–50% 50–60% 60–70% 70–80% 80–90% Kelley: 40–50% 50–60%
Governor before election
Howard Dean
Democratic
Elected Governor
Howard Dean
Democratic

The 1994 Vermont gubernatorial election took place on November 7, 1994. Incumbent Governor Howard Dean won re-election.

== Democratic primary ==
=== Candidates ===
- Howard Dean, incumbent Governor of Vermont

=== Results ===
Democratic Primary results
Party	Candidate	Votes	%
Democratic	Howard Dean (incumbent)	25,544	95.61
Democratic	Write-ins	1,173	4.39
Total votes		26,717	100.00

== Republican primary ==
=== Candidates ===
- David F. Kelley
- Thomas J. Morse
- John Gropper, businessman
- Gus Jaccacci

=== Results ===
Republican primary results
Party	Candidate	Votes	%
Republican	David F. Kelley	9,864	33.53
Republican	Thomas J. Morse	8,508	28.92
Republican	John Gropper	7,675	26.09
Republican	Write-ins	1,744	5.93
Republican	Gus Jaccacci	1,626	5.53
Total votes		29,417	100.00

== Liberty Union primary ==
=== Candidates ===
- Richard F. Gottlieb

=== Results ===
Liberty Union primary results
Party	Candidate	Votes	%
Liberty Union	Richard F. Gottlieb	278	90.55
Liberty Union	Write-ins	29	9.45
Total votes		307	100.00

== General election ==
=== Results ===
1994 Vermont gubernatorial election
Party	Candidate	Votes	%	±%
Democratic	Howard Dean (incumbent)	145,661	68.69%	−6.04%
Republican	David F. Kelley	40,292	19.00%	−4.04%
Independent	Thomas J. Morse	15,000	7.07%	
Grassroots	Dennis Lane	2,118	1.00%	
Independent	William Brueckner	2,071	0.98%	
Independent	Gus Jaccaci	2,043	0.96%	
Liberty Union	Richard F. Gottlieb	1,733	0.82%	−0.27%
Natural Law	Bill Brunelle	1,668	0.79%	
Write-in		1,460	0.69%	
Majority		105,369	49.69%	−2.00%
Turnout		212,046		
Democratic hold		Swing		
