= 1994 United States House of Representatives election in Vermont =

1994 United States House of Representatives election in Vermont's at-large district
- November 8, 1994
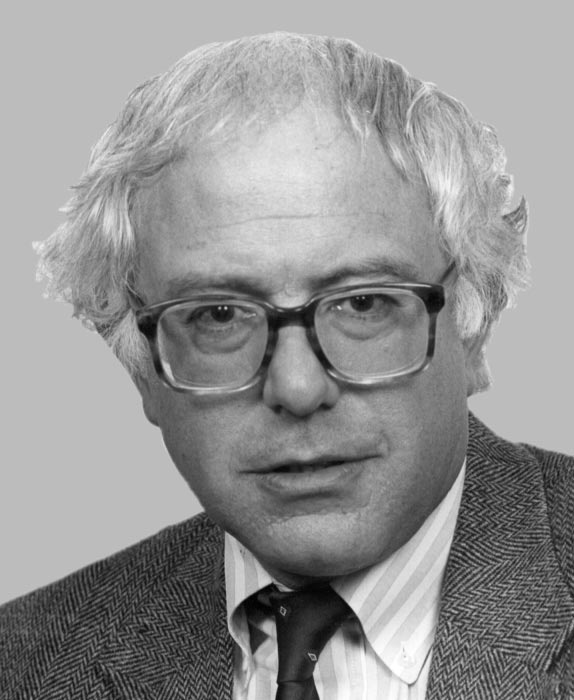

Nominee	Bernie Sanders	John Carroll
Party	Independent	Republican
Alliance	Democratic
Popular vote	105,502	98,523
Percentage	49.90%	46.59%
- Sanders: 40–50% 50–60% 60–70% 70–80% Carroll: 30–40% 40–50% 50–60% 60–70% 70–80% Tie: 40–50%
U.S. Representative before election
Bernie Sanders
Independent
Elected U.S. Representative
Bernie Sanders
Independent

The 1994 United States House of Representatives election in Vermont was held on Tuesday, November 8, 1994, to elect the U.S. representative from the state's at-large congressional district. The election coincided with the elections of other federal and state offices, including an election to the U.S. Senate.

In the midst of the Republican Revolution, Bernie Sanders was narrowly re-elected by a margin of 3.31% over Republican John Carroll. This was the closest election of Sanders' congressional career, and the last time he lost any Vermont county in a statewide race until 2024.

Sanders received endorsement by the Democratic Party, and continued to caucus with the party.

== Republican primary ==
=== Candidates ===
==== Declared ====
- Clint Barnum, stonemason
- John Carroll, majority leader of the Vermont State Senate

Republican primary results
Party	Candidate	Votes	%
Republican	John Carroll	24,106	83.11
Republican	Clint Barnum	4,586	15.81
Republican	Write-ins	312	1.08
Total votes		29,004	100.00

== Democratic primary ==
Democratic primary results
Party	Candidate	Votes	%
Democratic	Bernie Sanders (write-in)	1,968	42.45
Democratic	John Carroll (write-in)	1,458	31.45
Democratic	Write-ins	1,210	26.10
Total votes		4,636	100.00

== Liberty Union primary ==
Liberty Union primary results
Party	Candidate	Votes	%
Liberty Union	Annette Larson	282	93.07
Liberty Union	Write-ins	21	6.93
Total votes		303	100.00

== General election ==
Vermont's at-large congressional district election, 1994
Party	Candidate	Votes	%
Independent	Bernie Sanders (incumbent)	105,502	49.90
Republican	John Carroll	98,523	46.59
Natural Law	Carole Banus	2,963	1.40
Grassroots	Jack (Buck) Rogers	2,664	1.26
Liberty Union	Annette Larson	1,493	0.71
Write-ins	N/A	304	0.14
Total votes		211,449	100.00
Independent hold			
