= Mark Candon =

American politician (1952–2023)

Member of the Vermont House of Representatives
- In office 1980s–???

Personal details
- Born: February 10, 1952 Burlington, Vermont, U.S.
- Died: November 28, 2023 (aged 71) near Pico Mountain, Vermont, U.S.

Mark Candon (February 10, 1952 – November 28, 2023) was an American politician. He served as a member of the Vermont House of Representatives as a Democrat. He became a Republican in 1992, and was the Republican nominee for Vermont's at-large congressional district in 1998. He was defeated by incumbent independent Bernie Sanders, who also received the Democratic Party's endorsement.

== Life and career ==
Mark Candon was born in Burlington, Vermont, on February 10, 1952.

Candon served in the Vermont House of Representatives during the 1980s.

Candon died in an automobile crash on November 28, 2023, at the age of 71.
