= 1992 United States House of Representatives election in Vermont =

- November 3, 1992
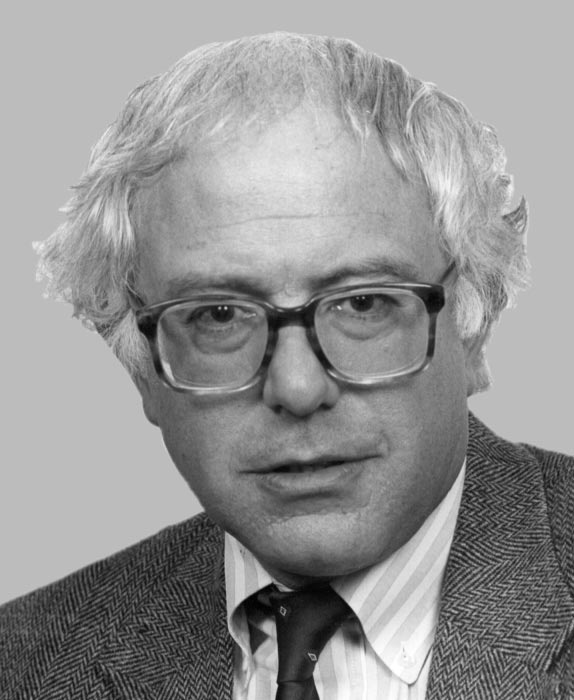

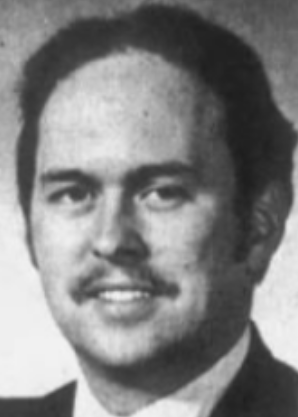

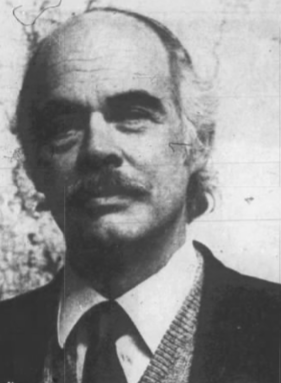
Nominee	Bernie Sanders	Tim Philbin	Lewis E. Young
Party	Independent	Republican	Democratic
Popular vote	162,724	86,901	22,279
Percentage	57.78%	30.86%	7.91%
- Sanders: 30–40% 40–50% 50–60% 60–70% 70–80% Philbin: 30–40% 40–50% 50–60% 60–70%
Representative
At-large before election
Bernie Sanders
Independent
Elected Representative
At-large
Bernie Sanders
Independent

The 1992 United States House of Representatives election in Vermont was held on Tuesday, November 3, 1992, to elect the U.S. representative from the state's at-large congressional district. The election coincided with the elections of other federal and state offices, including a quadrennial presidential election and an election to the U.S. Senate.

Incumbent Independent Bernie Sanders would win re-election to a second term in Congress, defeating Republican Tim Philbin and Democrat Lewis Young.

== Republican primary ==
=== Candidates ===
- Tim Philbin, insurance agent
- Ralph Sinclair, snack company owner (withdrew, endorsed Philbin)
- Jeff Wennberg, mayor of Rutland

=== Campaign ===
A total of three candidates made the ballot in the Republican primary, insurance agent Tim Philbin, Rutland mayor Jeff Wennberg, and businessman Ralph Sinclair. Wennberg was considered a moderate Republican, backing abortion rights and tax increases on the rich, while Philbin and Sinclair were conservative Republicans who were opposed to abortion and any tax increases. Originally, Wennberg was considered the frontrunner in the primary, but in early September 1992 Sinclair, who had fallen into a distinct third place in the race, withdrew his candidacy and backed Philbin, which was viewed as potentially giving the latter the edge.

=== Endorsements ===
Jeff Wennberg

Federal officials

- Jim Jeffords, U.S. senator from Vermont

Organizations

- NRA Political Victory Fund

Newspapers and publications

- Rutland Daily Herald

=== Results ===
Republican primary results
Party	Candidate	Votes	%
Republican	Tim Philbin	18,489	50.21
Republican	Jeff Wennberg	14,881	40.41
Republican	Ralph H. Sinclair (withdrawn)	3,250	8.83
Republican	Write-ins	203	0.55
Total votes		36,823	100.00

== Democratic primary ==
=== Candidates ===
==== Declared ====
- Lewis E. Young, chef and candidate for Vermont secretary of state in 1988

==== Declined ====
- David Wolk, state senator

=== Results ===
Democratic primary results
Party	Candidate	Votes	%
Democratic	Lewis E. Young	16,305	90.08
Democratic	Write-ins	1,796	9.92
Total votes		18,101	100.00

== Liberty Union primary ==
Liberty Union primary results
Party	Candidate	Votes	%
Liberty Union	Peter Diamondstone	308	95.36
Liberty Union	Write-ins	15	4.64
Total votes		323	100.00

== General election ==
=== Candidates ===
- John Dewey (Natural Law), former director of Flight Training at the Florida Institute of Technology
- Peter Diamondstone (Liberty Union), perennial candidate and socialist activist
- Douglas M. Miller (Freedom for LaRouche)
- Tim Philbin (Republican), insurance agent
- Bernie Sanders (Independent), incumbent U.S. representative
- Lewis E. Young (Democratic), chef and candidate for Vermont secretary of state in 1988

=== Campaign ===
As the campaign began, Sanders and Philbin immediately began to attack each other in the press, with their sniping deemed by the Brattleboro Reformer as a "fax war". Sanders attacked Philbin for opposing abortions, even in cases of rape and incest, and championed his own record supporting abortion rights. Philbin responded by accusing Sanders of misrepresenting his position, and accused the incumbent of supporting "fat budgets and high taxes".

=== Debates ===
1992 Vermont at-large congressional district general election debates
No.	Date & time	Host	Moderator	Link	Participants			
Key: P Participant A Absent N Non-invitee								
Key: P Participant A Absent N Non-invitee					Peter Diamondstone	Timothy Philbin	Bernie Sanders	Lewis E. Young
1	September 26, 1992	The Burlington Free Press			P	P	P	P

=== Endorsements ===
Tim Philbin (R)

Federal officials

- Jim Jeffords, U.S. senator from Vermont

Newspapers and publications

- Caledonian-Record
Bernie Sanders (I)

State officials

- Donald M. Hooper, state representative and Democratic nominee for Vermont Secretary of State

Labor unions

- National Education Association
- United Electrical, Radio and Machine Workers of America

Newspapers and publications

- Rutland Daily Herald
Lewis E. Young (D)

State officials

- Howard Dean, governor of Vermont

=== Polling ===
Poll source	Date(s) administered	Sample size	Margin of error	Tim Philbin	Bernie Sanders	Lewis E. Young	Other	Undecided
Political/Media Research	September 15, 1992	610 (LV)	± 4.0%	22%	43%	9%		
The Burlington Free Press			± 5.0%	23%	49%	5%	1% (Note: Peter Diamondstone with 1%)	22%

=== Results ===
Vermont's at-large congressional district election, 1992
Party	Candidate	Votes	%
Independent	Bernie Sanders (incumbent)	162,724	57.78
Republican	Tim Philbin	86,901	30.86
Democratic	Lewis E. Young	22,279	7.91
Liberty Union	Peter Diamondstone	3,660	1.30
Natural Law	John Dewey	3,549	1.26
Freedom for LaRouche	Douglas M. Miller	2,049	0.73
Write-ins	N/A	464	0.16
Total votes		281,626	100.00
Independent hold			
