= 1998 United States House of Representatives election in Vermont =

1998 United States House of Representatives election in Vermont's at-large district
- November 3, 1998
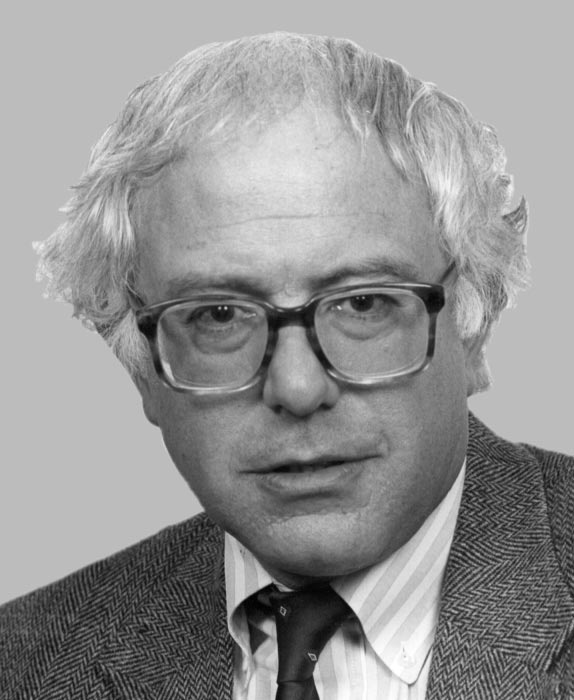

Nominee	Bernie Sanders	Mark Candon
Party	Independent	Republican
Alliance	Democratic
Popular vote	136,403	70,740
Percentage	63.40%	32.88%
- Sanders: 40–50% 50–60% 60–70% 70–80% 80–90% Candon: 40–50% 50–60% 60–70%
U.S. Representative before election
Bernie Sanders
Independent
Elected U.S. Representative
Bernie Sanders
Independent

The 1998 United States House of Representatives election in Vermont was held on Tuesday, November 3, 1998, to elect the U.S. representative from the state's at-large congressional district. The election coincided with the elections of other federal and state offices, including an election to the U.S. Senate.

Incumbent Independent Bernie Sanders won re-election to a fifth term, defeating Republican former state representative Mark Candon by over 30 points.

== Republican primary ==
=== Candidates ===
- Mark Candon, investment advisor and former state representative
- Peter Diamondstone, perennial candidate and socialist activist
- Jack Long, lawyer and Democratic nominee for VT-AL in 1996

=== Results ===
The race was unique in that both Candon and Long were former Democrats while Diamondstone was a socialist positioning himself to Bernie Sanders' left.

Candon won the primary against Long by a comfortable 16-point margin. His victory came off the back of a very strong result in Rutland County, where he received over 90% of the vote, while also keeping Long's margin of victory in Chittenden County down to 15%. Diamondstone's effect on the primary was disputed; Long believed that Diamondstone had drawn voters from his campaign while Candon stated that he did not believe Diamondstone had a notable effect on the results.

Republican primary results
Party	Candidate	Votes	%
Republican	Mark Candon	23,101	48.43
Republican	Jack Long	15,716	32.95
Republican	Peter Diamondstone	8,327	17.46
Republican	Write-ins	552	1.16
Total votes		47,696	100.00

== Democratic primary ==
Democratic primary results
Party	Candidate	Votes	%
Democratic	Bernie Sanders (Write-in)	1,661	47.88
Democratic	Mark Candon (Write-in)	524	15.11
Democratic	Other Write-ins	467	13.46
Democratic	Jack Long (Write-in)	465	13.40
Democratic	Peter Diamondstone (Write-in)	352	10.15
Total votes		3,469	100.00

== General election ==
=== Endorsements ===
Bernie Sanders (I)

Newspapers and publications

- Bennington Banner
Mark Candon (R)

State officials

- Thomas P. Salmon, former Governor of Vermont (Democratic)

=== Results ===
Vermont's at-large congressional district election, 1998
Party	Candidate	Votes	%
Independent	Bernie Sanders (incumbent)	136,403	63.40
Republican	Mark Candon	70,740	32.88
Grassroots	Matthew Mulligan	3,464	1.61
Liberty Union	Peter Diamondstone	2,153	1.00
Libertarian	Robert Maynard	2,097	0.98
Write-ins	N/A	276	0.13
Total votes		215,133	100.00
Independent hold			
