= 2000 United States presidential election in Vermont =

- November 7, 2000
- Turnout: 69.5% ▲1.6 pp

Nominee	Al Gore	George W. Bush	Ralph Nader
Party	Democratic	Republican	Green
Alliance			Progressive
Home state	Tennessee	Texas	Connecticut
Running mate	Joe Lieberman	Dick Cheney	Winona LaDuke
Electoral vote	3	0	0
Popular vote	149,022	119,775	20,374
Percentage	50.63%	40.70%	6.92%

Gore
40–50%
50–60%
60–70%
70–80%
Bush
40–50%
50–60%
60–70%
Browne
50–60%
President before election
Bill Clinton
Democratic
Elected President
George W. Bush
Republican

The 2000 United States presidential election in Vermont took place on November 7, 2000, and was part of the 2000 United States presidential election. Voters chose three representatives, or electors to the Electoral College, who voted for president and vice president.

Vermont was won by Democratic Vice President Al Gore by 9.93 percentage points over Republican Governor of Texas George W. Bush, while third-party candidate Ralph Nader took nearly 7% of the vote (his second-best showing in the country by percentage). Gore's win in Vermont marked the third consecutive victory for Democrats in Vermont, cementing the former Republican bastion's powerful shift towards the Democratic Party. This election marked the first time in history that a Republican won the presidency without carrying Vermont, as well as the first time that the Democratic Party carried the state with a majority of the vote for two elections in a row. This also marked the first time that Vermont would vote Democratic in a close presidential election, as well as the only time in history that the state has voted Democratic while neighboring New Hampshire has voted Republican.

As of the 2024 presidential election, this remains the last time that a Republican nominee has received more than 40% of the vote in Vermont, or that the margin of victory was in single digits. It also remains the last presidential election in which a Republican has carried Caledonia and Orange counties and the last one to carry Orleans County until Donald Trump narrowly won it in 2024. Bush became the first ever Republican to win the White House without carrying Bennington, Lamoille, Rutland, Washington, or Windsor Counties.

Vermont was one of ten states that backed George H. W. Bush for president in 1988 that didn't back George W. Bush in either 2000 or 2004.

== General election ==
=== Polling ===
Poll source	Date(s)	Sample size	Margin of error	George W. Bush (R)	Al Gore (D)	Ralph Nader (G)	Other / undecided (Note: Calculated by taking the difference of 100% and all other listed candidates combined. For polls that do not report a figure for Nader, this includes his support.)
Rasmussen Reports	October 26, 2000	1,000	—	39%	45%	—	16%
Research 2000	October 24, 2000	400	—	36%	52%	5%	7%
Mason-Dixon Polling & Strategy	October 19, 2000	628	—	38%	47%	6%	9%

=== Results ===
2000 United States presidential election in Vermont
Party	Candidate	Votes	Percentage	Electoral votes
Democratic	Al Gore	149,022	50.63%	3
Republican	George W. Bush	119,775	40.70%	0
Green/Progressive	Ralph Nader	20,374	6.92%	0
Reform	Pat Buchanan	2,192	0.74%	0
Vermont Grassroots	Dennis "Denny" Lane	1,044	0.35%	0
Libertarian	Harry Browne	784	0.27%	0
Natural Law	John Hagelin	219	0.07%	0
Liberty Union	David McReynolds	161	0.05%	0
Constitution	Howard Phillips	153	0.05%	0
Socialist Workers	James Harris	70	0.02%	0
Write-in		514	0.17%	—
Totals		294,308	100.00%	3
Voter turnout		64%		+6%

==== By county ====
County	Al Gore Democratic		George W. Bush Republican		Ralph Nader Green		Various candidates Other parties		Margin		Total votes cast
County	#	%	#	%	#	%	#	%	#	%	Total votes cast
Addison	8,936	51.28%	6,953	39.90%	1,207	6.93%	331	1.90%	1,983	11.38%	17,427
Bennington	9,021	51.03%	7,284	41.21%	1,112	6.29%	260	1.48%	1,737	9.82%	17,677
Caledonia	5,859	42.95%	6,746	49.45%	771	5.65%	265	1.94%	-887	-6.50%	13,641
Chittenden	39,156	54.37%	26,105	36.25%	5,769	8.01%	987	1.37%	13,141	18.12%	72,017
Essex	1,129	39.04%	1,564	54.08%	133	4.60%	66	2.28%	-435	-15.04%	2,892
Franklin	9,514	49.57%	8,395	43.74%	823	4.29%	462	2.41%	1,119	5.83%	19,194
Grand Isle	1,835	50.44%	1,550	42.61%	174	4.78%	79	2.17%	285	7.83%	3,638
Lamoille	5,676	50.47%	4,456	39.62%	878	7.81%	236	2.09%	1,220	10.85%	11,246
Orange	6,694	45.55%	6,858	46.67%	888	6.04%	255	1.73%	-164	-1.12%	14,695
Orleans	5,472	45.10%	5,799	47.80%	564	4.65%	297	2.45%	-327	-2.70%	12,132
Rutland	13,990	47.65%	13,546	46.13%	1,355	4.61%	471	1.61%	444	1.52%	29,362
Washington	15,281	51.37%	11,448	38.48%	2,433	8.18%	587	1.98%	3,833	12.89%	29,749
Windham	11,319	52.67%	7,358	34.24%	2,475	11.52%	339	1.58%	3,961	18.43%	21,491
Windsor	15,140	51.94%	11,713	40.19%	1,792	6.15%	502	1.72%	3,427	11.75%	29,147
Totals	149,022	50.63%	119,775	40.70%	20,374	6.92%	5,137	1.75%	29,247	9.93%	294,308

Counties that flipped from Democratic to Republican

- Caledonia (largest city: St. Johnsbury)
- Essex (largest city: Lunenburg)
- Orange (largest city: Randolph)
- Orleans (largest city: Derby)

==== By congressional district ====
Due to the state's low population, only one congressional district is allocated. This district, called the at-large district because it covers the entire state, is thus equivalent to the statewide election results.

District	Bush	Gore	Representative
At-large	40.7%	50.63%	Bernie Sanders

== See also ==
- United States presidential elections in Vermont
