= 1972 United States Senate special election in Vermont =

- January 7, 1972
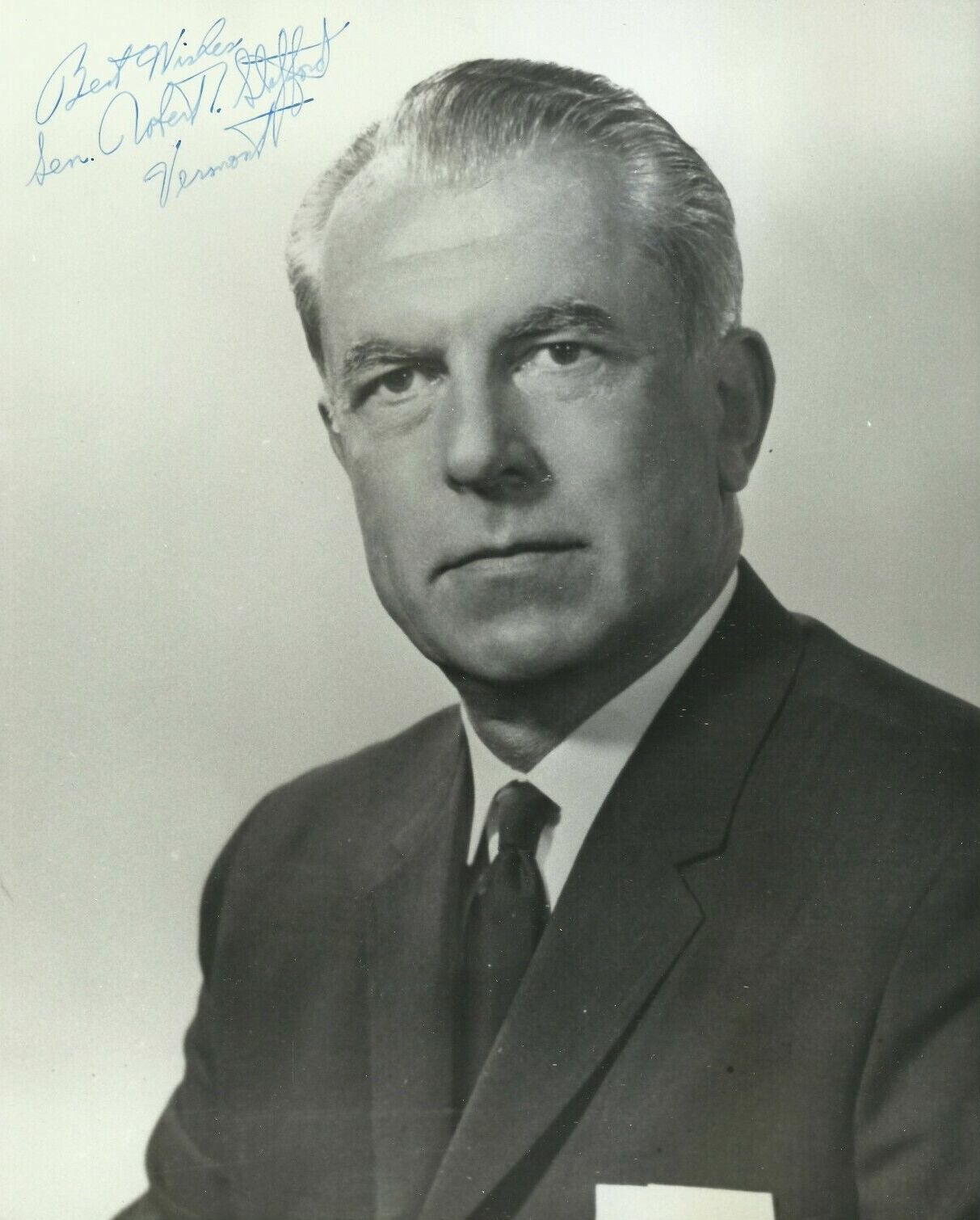

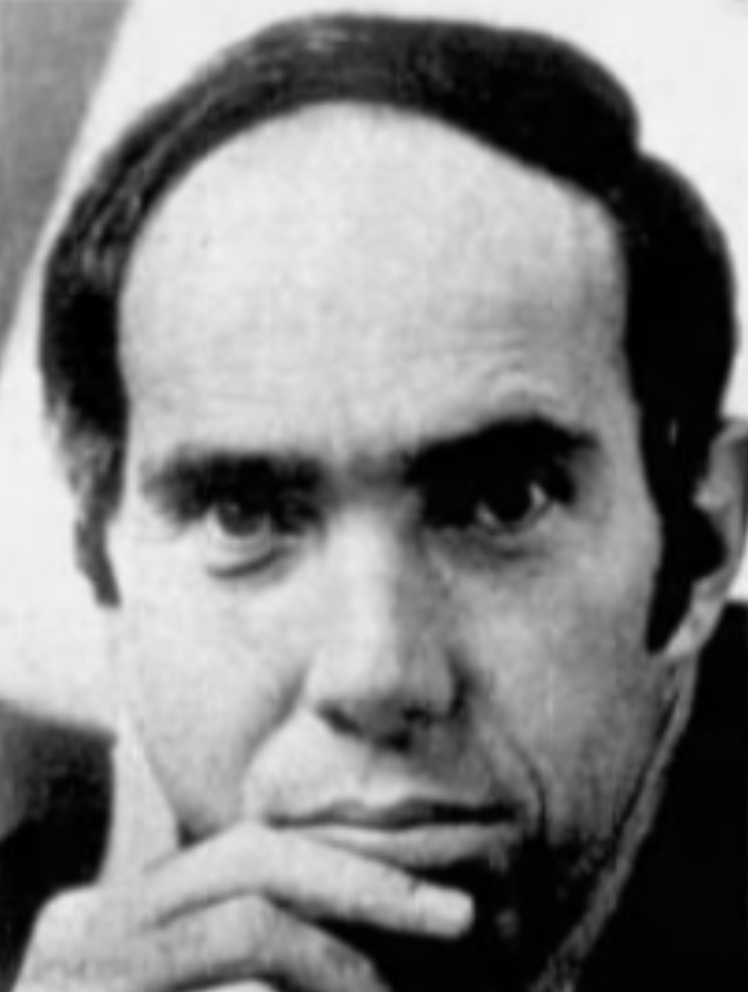
Nominee	Robert Stafford	Randolph Major
Party	Republican	Democratic
Popular vote	45,888	23,842
Percentage	64.36%	33.44%
- County results Stafford: 50–60% 60–70% 70–80%
U.S. senator before election
Robert Stafford
Republican
Elected U.S. Senator
Robert Stafford
Republican

The 1972 United States Senate special election in Vermont took place on January 7, 1972. Incumbent Republican Robert Stafford, appointed in September 1971 to fill the vacancy created by the death of Winston L. Prouty, successfully ran for election to the remainder of Prouty's term in the United States Senate. Stafford defeated Democratic candidate Randolph T. Major. Liberty Union candidate Bernie Sanders received 2% of the vote and was later elected to this seat in 2006 as an independent.

== General election ==
=== Results ===
United States Senate special election in Vermont, 1972
Party	Candidate	Votes	%	±%
Republican	Robert Stafford (incumbent)	45,888	64.36%	+5.48%
Democratic	Randolph T. Major	23,842	33.44%	−6.76%
Liberty Union	Bernie Sanders	1,571	2.20%	+1.29%
Total votes		71,301	100.00%	

== See also ==
- 1972 United States Senate elections
