= 2000 United States House of Representatives election in Vermont =

2000 United States House of Representatives election in Vermont's at-large district
- November 7, 2000
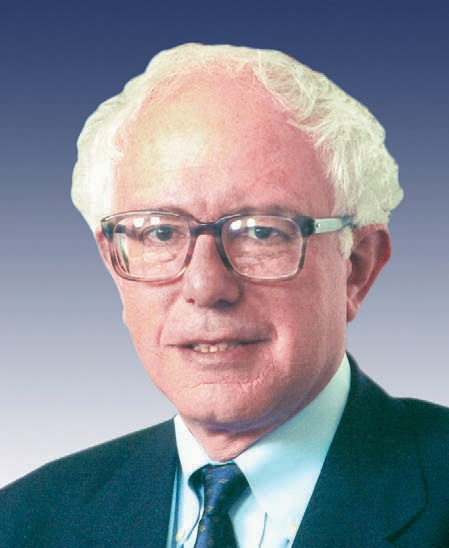

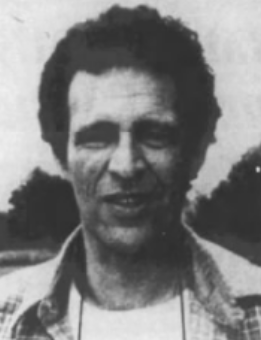
Nominee	Bernie Sanders	Karen Ann Kerin	Peter Diamondstone
Party	Independent	Republican	Democratic
Alliance			Liberty Union
Popular vote	196,118	51,977	14,918
Percentage	69.21%	18.34%	5.26%
- Sanders: 30–40% 40–50% 50–60% 60–70% 70–80% 80–90% Kerin: 40–50%
U.S. Representative before election
Bernie Sanders
Independent
Elected U.S. Representative
Bernie Sanders
Independent

The 2000 United States House of Representatives election in Vermont was held on Tuesday, November 7, 2000, to elect the U.S. representative from the state's at-large congressional district. The election coincided with the elections of other federal and state offices, including a quadrennial presidential election and an election to the U.S. Senate.

Incumbent Independent Bernie Sanders defeated Republican nominee Karen Ann Kerin, the first ever openly transgender candidate for Congress, and Democratic nominee Peter Diamondstone, a socialist activist and perennial candidate.

== Republican primary ==
=== Candidates ===
==== Declared ====
- Karen Ann Kerin, lawyer and former engineer

==== Withdrawn ====
- Lloyd Robinson, transportation consultant

==== Results ====
Republican primary results
Party	Candidate	Votes	%
Republican	Karen Ann Kerin	47,632	92.47
Republican	Write-ins	2,981	5.79
Republican	Bernie Sanders (write-in)	895	1.74
Total votes		51,508	100.00

== Democratic primary ==
Democratic primary results
Party	Candidate	Votes	%
Democratic	Peter Diamondstone	20,539	90.94
Democratic	Bernie Sanders (write-in)	1,337	5.92
Democratic	Write-ins	710	3.14
Total votes		22,586	100.00

== General election ==
=== Candidates ===
- Peter Diamondstone (Democratic), perennial candidate and socialist activist
- Karen Ann Kerin (Republican), lawyer and former engineer
- Daniel H. Krymkowski (Libertarian), professor at the University of Vermont
- Jack Rogers (Grassroots), farmer and educator
- Bernie Sanders (Independent), incumbent U.S. Representative
- Stewart Skrill (Independent), farmer and flower grower

=== Campaign ===
Kerin, a transgender woman, received national media attention for being the first openly transgender candidate for Congress. She expressed frustration with the media focus on her transgender status rather than her political positions, stating to Newsweek that she wanted reporters to "ask me more about what's in my head and less about what's between my legs". There was some surprise at Kerin's decision to run as a Republican, due to that party's opposition to LGBT rights at the time; Kerin stated to The Advocate that she believed that Republicans were stauncher defenders of civil rights than Democrats. Kerin's campaign was primarily based around economic issues, but she nevertheless expressed pride at being the first transgender congressional candidate.

There was substantial confusion surrounding the reason that Kerin had decided to undergo a sex change; Kerin herself claimed that it was for medical reasons after she was diagnosed with prostate cancer in order to avoid a colostomy, but an investigation by several newspapers revealed that whether Kerin had ever been diagnosed with prostate cancer was in question, with Kerin's ex-wife claiming that Kerin had simply wanted to change her sex, and Kerin having given an interview to a Delaware newspaper a decade prior where she discussed her reasons for changing sex, not mentioning cancer. When questioned by the Barre Montpelier Times Argus Kerin was unable to explain how getting a sex change would have prevented her from needing a colostomy.

=== Endorsements ===
Peter Diamondstone (D)

Individuals

- David McReynolds, activist and Socialist Party USA nominee for President of the United States

=== Results ===
Sanders carried every county and all but one municipality in the state, with Kerin winning the town of Stratton.

Vermont's at-large congressional district election, 2000
Party	Candidate	Votes	%
Independent	Bernie Sanders (incumbent)	196,118	69.21%
Republican	Karen Ann Kerin	51,977	18.34%
Democratic	Peter Diamondstone	14,918	5.26%
Independent	Stewart Skrill	11,816	4.17%
Grassroots	Jack Rogers	4,799	1.69%
Libertarian	Daniel H. Krymkowski	2,978	1.05%
Write-ins	N/A	760	0.27%
Total votes		283,366	100.00
Independent hold			

==== Results by county ====
County	Bernie Sanders Independent		Karen Ann Kerin Republican		Peter Diamondstone Democratic		Various candidates		Margin		Total
County	#	%	#	%	#	%	#	%	#	%	Total
Addison	12,252	72.8%	2,900	17.2%	767	4.6%	919	5.4%	9,352	55.6%	16,838
Bennington	10,017	59.3%	4,404	26.1%	1,555	9.2%	917	5.4%	5,613	33.2%	16,893
Caledonia	8,744	66.1%	2,663	20.1%	605	4.6%	1,222	9.2%	6,081	46.0%	13,234
Chittenden	51,161	74.5%	10,498	15.3%	2,902	4.2%	4,119	6.0%	40,663	59.2%	68,680
Essex	1,591	57.6%	715	25.9%	218	7.9%	239	8.7%	876	31.7%	2,763
Franklin	14,070	75.3%	2,692	14.4%	799	4.3%	1,133	6.1%	11,378	60.9%	18,964
Grand Isle	2,584	73.3%	554	15.7%	152	4.3%	233	6.6%	2,030	57.6%	3,523
Lamoille	8,174	74.9%	1,757	16.1%	390	3.6%	593	5.4%	6,417	58.8%	10,914
Orange	8,984	62.8%	2,278	15.9%	659	4.6%	2,374	16.6%	6,706	46.9%	14,295
Orleans	8,263	70.0%	1,828	15.5%	490	4.1%	1,227	10.4%	6,435	54.5%	11,808
Rutland	17,682	62.6%	6,763	24.0%	1,571	5.6%	2,212	7.8%	10,919	38.6%	28,228
Washington	21,229	74.0%	4,134	14.4%	1,222	4.3%	2,090	7.3%	17,095	59.6%	28,675
Windham	13,127	63.6%	4,672	22.6%	1,711	8.3%	1,145	5.5%	8,455	41.0%	20,655
Windsor	18,240	64.8%	6,119	21.7%	1,877	6.7%	1,930	6.8%	12,121	43.1%	28,166
Totals	196,118	69.2%	51,977	18.3%	14,918	5.3%	20,353	7.2%	144,141	50.9%	283,366
