= 2004 United States presidential election in Vermont =

- November 2, 2004

Nominee	John Kerry	George W. Bush
Party	Democratic	Republican
Home state	Massachusetts	Texas
Running mate	John Edwards	Dick Cheney
Electoral vote	3	0
Popular vote	184,067	121,180
Percentage	58.94%	38.80%

Kerry
40–50%
50–60%
60–70%
70–80%
80–90%
Bush
40–50%
50–60%
60–70%
80–90%
President before election
George W. Bush
Republican
Elected President
George W. Bush
Republican

The 2004 United States presidential election in Vermont took place on November 2, 2004, and was part of the 2004 United States presidential election. Voters chose three representatives, or electors to the Electoral College, who voted for president and vice president.

Vermont is the home state of United States presidential candidate and anti-war advocate Howard Dean, its former governor. Vermont voted overwhelmingly for the Democratic candidate, Senator John Kerry of Massachusetts, over incumbent Republican President George W. Bush of Texas. Kerry received 58.94% of the vote to Bush's 38.80%, a Democratic victory margin of 20.14%.

Kerry also swept 13 of the state's 14 counties, breaking 60% in 6 of them. Kerry's strongest county was Windham County, which he won with 66.43% of the vote to Bush's 31.22%. Only one county voted for Bush, sparsely populated bellwether Essex County in the far northeast of the state, which Bush won with 54.17% of the vote. A state with strong liberal and anti-war tendencies, Vermont registered as the third most Democratic state in the nation in the 2004 election, its results making the state about 23% more Democratic than the nation. It also had the strongest Democratic swing of any state in the nation against Bush compared to the 2000 result. Even as Bush increased his nationwide popular vote support from a 0.52% loss to Al Gore in 2000 to a 2.46% nationwide victory in 2004, Vermont swung 10.20% against Bush, representing the strongest such swing and making the state trend 13.18% Democratic relative to the nation. This portended the future trend of the state toward dominance by the Democratic Party, as Democrat Barack Obama would carry the state in a 67-30 landslide four years later in 2008 and again in 2012.

Kerry, from neighboring Massachusetts, was the first Northern Democrat ever to carry Vermont. The previous three Democratic presidential candidates to carry the state were all from the South (Lyndon B. Johnson was from Texas, Bill Clinton from Arkansas and Al Gore from Tennessee), even though Vermont is a northern state. This was the first time a Republican had won the national popular vote without carrying Vermont (and so far the only time a Republican has done so with a majority of the popular vote). Bush thus became the first-ever Republican to win the White House without carrying Caledonia, Orange, or Orleans Counties. Bush became the first Republican to ever win two terms (and so far the only Republican candidate to win consecutive presidential elections) without ever carrying the state.

== Democratic primary ==
Primary date: March 2, 2004

2004 Vermont Democratic presidential primary
Candidate	Votes	Percentage	Delegates
Howard Dean	44,393	53.6%	9
John Kerry	26,171	31.6%	6
Dennis Kucinich	3,396	4.1%	0
Wesley Clark	2,749	3.3%	0
Others	1,059	1.3%	0
Total	-	100.00%	28

== Campaign ==
=== Predictions ===
There were 12 news organizations who made state-by-state predictions of the election. Here are their last predictions before election day.

Source	Ranking
D.C. Political Report	Solid D
Cook Political Report	Solid D
Research 2000	Solid D
Zogby International	Likely D
Washington Post	Solid D
Washington Dispatch	Likely D
Washington Times	Solid D
The New York Times	Solid D
CNN	Solid D
Newsweek	Solid D
Associated Press	Solid D
Rasmussen Reports	Solid D

== Results ==
2004 United States presidential election in Vermont
Party	Candidate	Votes	%	±%
Democratic	John Kerry	184,067	58.94%	▲8.38
Republican	George W. Bush	121,180	38.80%	▼1.90
Independent	Ralph Nader (Note: Listed decline is from Nader's performance as Green and Progressive nominee in the previous election.)	4,494	1.44%	▼5.48
Libertarian	Michael Badnarik	1,102	0.35%	▲0.08
Write-in		957	0.31%	N/A
Liberty Union	John Parker	265	0.09%	▲0.04
Socialist Workers	Róger Calero	244	0.08%	▲0.06
Total votes		312,309	100.00%	N/A

=== By county ===
County	John Kerry Democratic		George W. Bush Republican		Various candidates Other parties		Margin		Total votes cast
County	#	%	#	%	#	%	#	%	Total votes cast
Addison	11,147	60.00%	7,077	38.09%	355	1.91%	4,070	21.91%	18,579
Bennington	11,069	58.06%	7,616	39.95%	380	1.99%	3,453	18.11%	19,065
Caledonia	7,106	50.00%	6,765	47.60%	340	2.39%	341	2.40%	14,211
Chittenden	49,369	63.54%	26,422	34.01%	1,905	2.45%	22,947	29.53%	77,696
Essex	1,276	43.45%	1,591	54.17%	70	2.38%	-315	-10.72%	2,937
Franklin	10,598	53.20%	8,936	44.86%	386	1.95%	1,662	8.34%	19,920
Grand Isle	2,246	55.09%	1,754	43.02%	77	1.89%	492	12.07%	4,077
Lamoille	7,636	62.69%	4,260	34.97%	285	2.34%	3,376	27.72%	12,181
Orange	8,159	54.78%	6,421	43.11%	315	2.12%	1,738	11.67%	14,895
Orleans	6,330	51.71%	5,666	46.28%	246	2.01%	664	5.43%	12,242
Rutland	15,904	51.34%	14,440	46.62%	631	2.03%	1,464	4.72%	30,975
Washington	19,177	60.98%	11,461	36.44%	810	2.58%	7,716	24.54%	31,448
Windham	15,489	66.43%	7,280	31.22%	547	2.35%	8,209	35.21%	23,316
Windsor	18,561	60.33%	11,491	37.35%	715	2.33%	7,070	22.98%	30,767
Totals	184,067	58.94%	121,180	38.80%	7,062	2.26%	62,887	20.14%	312,309

==== Counties that flipped from Republican to Democratic ====
- Caledonia (largest municipality: St. Johnsbury)
- Orange (largest municipality: Randolph)
- Orleans (largest municipality: Derby)

=== By congressional district ===
Due to the state's low population, only one congressional district is allocated. This district, called the at-large district because it covers the entire state, is thus equivalent to the statewide election results.

District	Bush	Kerry	Representative
At-large	38.8%	58.9%	Bernie Sanders

== See also ==
- United States presidential elections in Vermont
