= Peter Diamondstone =

American politician (1934–2017)

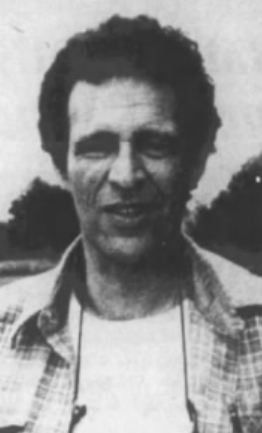
- Diamondstone in 1988

Personal details
- Born: Peter Isaac Diamondstone; December 19, 1934 New York City, U.S.
- Died: August 30, 2017 (aged 82) Dummerston, Vermont, U.S.
- Party: Liberty Union (1970–2017)
- Other political affiliations: Socialist (2010); Democratic (1970, 1974, 1990, 2000); Republican (1972, 1998); Organic Life (2000); Progressive (2002, 2004)
- Spouse: Doris Lake (m. 1957)
- Children: 4
- Education: University of Chicago
- Profession: Lawyer, politician

Peter Isaac Diamondstone (December 19, 1934 – August 30, 2017) was an American lawyer and socialist activist from the state of Vermont, best known as a perennial candidate and co-founder of the Liberty Union Party. He ran for various Vermont political offices, always unsuccessfully, in every election cycle from 1970 until 2016.

== Early life ==
Diamondstone was born in the New York borough of The Bronx in 1934 and raised in the borough of Queens, the son of Mildred and Jess Diamondstone. His father was a dentist and a socialist, personal friends with Socialist Party presidential candidate Norman Thomas, and Diamondstone attended a socialist summer camp, Camp Woodland, as a child, where he met Pete Seeger. In 1944, at the age of nine, Diamondstone got a job passing out flyers for the fourth presidential campaign of Franklin D. Roosevelt. He served in the U.S. Army from 1954 to 1956.

Diamondstone graduated from Queens College in 1957 and received a J.D. degree from the University of Chicago Law School in 1960. He moved to Vermont in 1968 to work for Vermont Legal Aid, where he soon entered the political scene.

== Career ==
Diamondstone, along with former U.S. Congressman William H. Meyer, Bernie Sanders (later a U.S. Senator and two-time Democratic presidential candidate), and others, founded the Liberty Union Party in 1970. From then until his death, he ran every two years for various political offices, never receiving more than 8% of the vote in general elections.

The early years of Liberty Union, according to Diamondstone, saw the party divided between two factions: "social democrats" represented by Meyer, Sanders, and Martha Abbott, who saw their principal role as moving the Democratic Party to the left, and "socialists/anarchists" represented by Diamondstone, who advocated for a genuinely independent third party instead. Several of the "social democrats" left the party after 1976, fueled by a debate over whether the party should have supported Jimmy Carter for president.

While Diamondstone usually carried the Liberty Union banner in his political campaigns, he occasionally ran under other party labels and even entered Democratic and Republican primaries. In 2000, he was the official Democratic nominee for U.S. House of Representatives and placed a distant third, behind Bernie Sanders (running as an independent) and Republican Karen Ann Kerin.

Diamondstone arrived late to a debate for U.S. Congress in 1980, and was told he would not be able to participate. He remained in the debate area and was arrested. He was also arrested in 1996 while attempting to participate in a debate for U.S. Congress, for which he was a candidate. In 2006, Diamondstone was escorted off stage and charged with disorderly conduct after cursing at students in the audience and repeatedly speaking past his allotted time during a U.S. Senate debate.

Once a friend and political ally of Bernie Sanders, the two gradually drifted apart as Sanders transitioned into mainstream electoral politics. While they remained friends after Sanders left Liberty Union in 1977, the friendship ended in 1984 over a political dispute. Diamondstone passed out anti-Sanders flyers, calling him a "Quisling" and criticizing him for endorsing Democratic presidential nominee Walter Mondale. He did not endorse Sanders' 2016 presidential candidacy and referred to him as a war criminal for supporting the 1999 NATO bombing of Yugoslavia. Diamondstone also believed Sanders was not a true socialist, as Sanders advocated "rebuilding the middle class," while "socialists want to destroy all the classes.”

== Political positions ==
Ideologically, Diamondstone identified as a "nonviolent revolutionary socialist" and claimed that while socialist revolution is desirable and necessary, it must be carried out by peaceful means on the part of the revolutionaries. He argued it is an imperative for capitalism to end, to be replaced by a socialist economic system, remarking in 2014, "My belief in socialism is unshakable!" He rejected the notion that the Democratic and Republican parties were meaningfully distinct, and said he and other Liberty Union candidates ran for office in order to provide voters an alternative to the two-party system, which he described as "evil."

Diamondstone was a supporter of Vermont seceding from the United States. He advocated for community ownership of the means of production as well as nationalization of the healthcare system and increasing the number of paid leave and paid vacation days. Diamondstone also believed in disbanding the Vermont National Guard and replacing it with a civilian militia. He opposed water fluoridation, genetically modified food, and the HPV vaccine, which he referred to as a "Big Pharma sham". Diamondstone was an advocate of eliminating the voting age. He also wanted to open hearings to investigate conspiracy theories relating to the September 11 attacks. His 2008 candidacy statement argued for "structurally revamping Vermont through socialism and prevention of trauma and disease," something which may "require secession" in order to be enacted.

Diamondstone, while coming from a Jewish family, was an opponent of Zionism, claiming, "Zionism has nothing to do with Judaism. As a matter of fact, probably about 90 percent of all Zionists are Christians." He endorsed withdrawing all military aid to Israel and criticized "war crimes and genocide" perpetrated by the Israeli government.

== Personal life ==
Diamondstone married Doris Lake in 1957. They had four children and, at the time of his death in 2017, 14 grandchildren and three great-grandchildren. He was an atheist.

Several of Diamondstone's family members, including his wife, children, and grandchildren, have also pursued elected office.

The Diamondstones lived in Brattleboro, Vermont for many years. In 1975, Diamondstone was accused of running an illegal junkyard on the property, but won the case in the Vermont Supreme Court. The Brattleboro home was destroyed in a fire in 2012, along with all the archives and records of the Liberty Union Party.

=== Death ===
Diamondstone died at his home in Dummerston, Vermont on August 30, 2017, at age 82. According to his wife, he was suffering from several ailments, including heart and kidney diseases, and had been recently released from the hospital. Diamondstone also suffered from leg sores which required him to wear shorts to stay comfortable.

Upon his death, Bernie Sanders said, "I first met Peter Diamondstone over 45 years ago. While I have not had any real contact with him for many, many years, I have the feeling that he never changed. Peter was a very independent thinker, unafraid to express his (often controversial) point of view on any subject. As a result, he forced people to examine and defend their own positions. No small thing. In his own way, Peter played an important role in Vermont politics for many decades."
