= Green Mountain Peace and Justice Party =

Socialist political party in Vermont, United States

- Abbreviation: GMPJP
- Founded: May 30, 1970; 56 years ago
- Headquarters: Dummerston, Vermont
- Ideology: Socialism; Eco-socialism; Anti-capitalism; Environmentalism
- Political position: Left-wing
- Colors: Lime
- Statewide Offices: 0 / 6
- Seats in the State Senate: 0 / 30
- Seats in the State House: 0 / 150
- Elected County Judges: 0 / 42
- Countywide Offices: 0 / 42
- Mayorships: 0 / 8
- Seats on the Burlington City Council: 0 / 12
- Other elected offices: 0 (July 2026)

Website
- greenmountainpeaceandjusticeparty.org

The Green Mountain Peace and Justice Party (GMPJP), formerly known as the Liberty Union Party (LUP) until 2021, is a socialist political party in Vermont, United States. LUP was formed in 1970 by progressives to contest the 1970 Senate election.

GMPJP is a self-proclaimed "non-violent socialist party". In 1995, LUP was described by The New York Times as the cradle of progressivism in Vermont.

GMPJP is the fourth-largest party in Vermont after the Democratic, Republican, and Progressive parties.

Notable past and present members include William H. Meyer, Peter Diamondstone, Bernie Sanders, Michael Parenti, and Mary Alice Herbert.

== History ==
=== Origins ===
The Liberty Union Party (LUP) was formed to contest the Vermont elections of 1970. LUP co-founders included former Congressman William H. Meyer, Peter Diamondstone, Dennis Morrisseau and others.

=== 1970s–1990s ===
In 1971, People's Party was formed as a national umbrella party for various socialist-oriented state parties, including the LUP.

In 1971, Bernie Sanders joined LUP and became the party's candidate for several offices. At the first party meeting he attended, in 1971, LUP nominated Sanders as the LUP Senate candidate in the January 1972 special election; he placed third with 2% of the vote. In 1974, Bernie Sanders ran again as the Senate candidate, but received 4.13% of the vote. In 1976, Sanders was the party's candidate for Vermont governor, where he received 6.1% of the vote, which remains the best result for any LUP candidate for governor as of 2021. In October 1977, at the time of his resignation from the party, Sanders was party chairman. Sanders quit due to the inactivity of the party between elections. As an independent politician, Sanders became Vermont's congressional representative in 1991 and US senator in 2007. He ran unsuccessfully as a Democratic presidential candidate in 2016 and 2020.

In 1974, political scientist Michael Parenti was the party's candidate for election to the House of Representatives; he placed third with 7.1% of the vote.

In 1976, the party's Vermont lieutenant governor candidate John Franco took enough votes to force the election to the Vermont General Assembly's House. The party also lost the outspoken members, Nancy Kaufman and Martha Abbott before the 1978 election cycle. Despite Liberty Union co-founder, Peter Diamondstone, appearing biennially on the ballot from 1970 through 2016, none of the party's candidates were elected during that period.

=== 2000s–present ===
In 2009, David Van Deusen, endorsed by LUP and the Vermont Progressive Party (VPP), won a contested race for a seat on the Moretown Select Board. Van Deusen was a District Vice President of the Vermont AFL-CIO, active within US Labor Against The War, cofounder of the Green Mountain Anarchist Collective, and received the backing of organized labor. This victory represented an electoral high water mark for the Liberty Union Party (previous Liberty Union wins included a Representational Town Meeting Delegate in Brattleboro, and a single Justice of the Peace position some decades earlier). In 2010 Van Deusen again ran and again won a contested seat on the Moretown Select Board. Again he was endorsed by the Liberty Union, the Progressives, the Socialist Party USA, and organized labor. In this election Van Deusen was the top vote-getter among four Select Board candidates (three candidates, including Van Deusen running for two one year seats, and one candidate running as a write-in for one open three-year seat). In 2011 Van Deusen did not seek re-election to the Select Board. In this election he ran for First Constable of Moretown (a position he held in 2007). While Van Deusen won the election, he did not seek the endorsement of the Liberty Union Party. This time he had the endorsement of the local Progressive Party alone. During Van Deusen's two terms on the Moretown Select Board, he was able to win "livable wages" for all non-elected town employees, doubled property tax relief for disabled military veterans (through a Town Meeting article), successfully advocated for the use of the Town Hall for a free weekly children's play group, made strides in opening up the local democratic process to all town residents, and publicly supported a Vermont run single-payer healthcare system.

In 2012, the party once again re-qualified for major party status as a result of a 13.1% showing for Liberty Union candidate Mary Alice Herbert in the election for Vermont Secretary of State against Democrat Jim Condos.

In 2014, the party re-qualified for major party status yet again as a result of a 10.32 showing for Liberty Union candidate Mary Alice Herbert in the election for Vermont Secretary of State. In the race for Treasurer Murray Ngoima received 8.3% of the vote. For Attorney General the LU candidate, Rosemary Jackowski, received 3.9% of the vote. In VT State Senate races, Ben Bosley won 13.9% of the vote for Grand Isle district. In the Windham County Senate contest, Jerry Levy & Aaron Diamondstone won on 5.0% & 4.6% of the ballots.

In the 2016 Vermont gubernatorial election, former Boston Red Sox and Montreal Expos pitcher Bill "Spaceman" Lee ran as the Liberty Union's candidate for governor. Lee supported single payer healthcare and ran far to the left of the Democratic Party while at the same time remaining an advocate for the right of Vermonters to own firearms. Lee received 2.8% which was the highest percentage for a LUP candidate for governor since the 1978 Vermont election and at the same time garnered 8,912 votes, second highest number for a Liberty Union gubernatorial candidate in the party's history.

In other 2016 races, Murray Ngoima received 3.9% of the vote for Treasurer, Mary Alice Herbert 9.7% for secretary state, Marina Brown 4.7% for Auditor and Rosemarie Jackowski 3.7% for attorney general. For US House, Erica Clawson received 9.2% of the vote. Liberty Union Party co-founder, Peter Diamondstone received 1.0% of the vote for US Senate.

In 2018 elections, Emily Peyton received 0.6% of the vote for Governorship, Murray Ngoima received 1.5% for lieutenant governor, Mary Alice Herbert received 3.6% for Secretary of State, Marina Brown received 3.9% for Auditor and Rosemarie Jackowski received 3.4% for Attorney General. For US House, Laura Potter received 1.4% of the vote. For US Senate, Reid Kane received 0.4% of the vote.

In 2020, the Liberty Union Party did not nominate any candidates for statewide office. They only nominated Gloria La Riva for presidency.

In September 2021, the party changed its name from Liberty Union to Green Mountain Peace and Justice. Jessica Diamondstone, party chair and daughter of the party's founder stated that she feared the old name might make the party sound as if it had right-wing positions. Diamondstone felt the new name would be more clear on the political positions of the party.

In 2022, under its new name, Green Mountain Peace and Justice Party nominees ran only for US Senate and Lieutenant Governor seats. For US Senate, Natasha Diamondstone-Kohout received 0.5% of the vote and for Lieutenant Governor, Ian Diamondstone received 2.9% of the vote. Both candidates were related to Peter Diamondstone.

In 2024 elections, June Goodband received 1.24% of the vote for governorship, Ian Diamondstone received 3.9% for lieutenant governor, Kevin Gustafson received 4.95% for Attorney General. For US House of Representatives Jessy Diamondstone received 2.15% of the vote and for US Senate Justin Schoville received 0.92% of the vote.

== Election results ==
=== Presidential elections ===
Over the years, GMPJP has endorsed various presidential candidates from other leftist political parties:

- People's Party: In 1971–1977, LUP was a member of the national PP and endorsed its candidates. In 1972, LUP endorsed Benjamin Spock. In 1976, LUP endorsed Margaret Wright.
- Socialist Party USA (SPUSA): In 1980, LUP endorsed David McReynolds. In 1988, LUP endorsed Willa Kenoyer. In 1996, LUP endorsed Mary Cal Hollis. In 2000, LUP endorsed David McReynolds. In 2008, only one candidate, SPUSA candidate Brian Moore, collected the 1,000 signatures required to participate in the LUP's binding presidential primary, which made Moore the LUP nominee by default. In 2012, LUP endorsed Stewart Alexander.
- New Alliance Party (NAP): In 1984, LUP endorsed NAP candidate Dennis Serrette. In 1992, LUP endorsed NAP candidate and Newmanite Lenora Fulani.
- Workers World Party (WWP): In 2004, due to conflicts with SPUSA candidate Mary Alice Herbert's running mate, Walt Brown, LUP instead endorsed WWP candidate John Parker.
- Party for Socialism and Liberation (PSL): In 2016, LUP endorsed Gloria La Riva. In 2020, LUP endorsed Gloria La Riva.
- Independents: In 2024, GMPJP nominated Cornel West as its candidate for President.

=== Gubernatorial elections ===
Year	Gubernatorial nominee	Votes	%
1972	Bernie Sanders	2,175	1.15%
1974	Martha Abbott	7,629	5.40%
1976	Bernie Sanders	11,317	6.09%
1978	Earl S. Gardner	3,629	2.92%
1980	John Potthast	1,952	0.93%
1982	Richard Gottlieb	850	0.50%
1984	Richard Gottlieb	695	0.30%
1986	Richard Gottlieb	491	0.25%
1988	Richard Gottlieb	2,923	1.20%
1990	Richard Gottlieb	1,389	0.66%
1992	Richard Gottlieb	3,120	1.09%
1994	Richard Gottlieb	1,733	0.82%
1996	Mary Alice Herbert	4,156	1.63%
1998	Richard Gottlieb	1,177	0.54%
2000	Richard Gottlieb	337	0.11%
2002	Peter Diamondstone	625	0.27%
2004	Peter Diamondstone	1,298	0.42%
2006	Bob Skold	638	0.24%
2008	Peter Diamondstone	1,710	0.54%
2010	Ben Mitchell	429	0.18%
2012	Dave Eagle	1,303	0.44%
2014	Peter Diamondstone	1,673	0.87%
2016	Bill Lee	8,913	2.83%
2018	Em Peyton	1,839	0.67%
2020	Did not nominate	N/A	nil
2022	Did not nominate	N/A	nil
2024	June Goodband	4,512	1.24%

== See also ==
- American Left
- Democratic Socialists of America
- Vermont Progressive Party
- Eco-socialist parties
- History of the socialist movement in the United States
