= John Edward Moran =

American politician

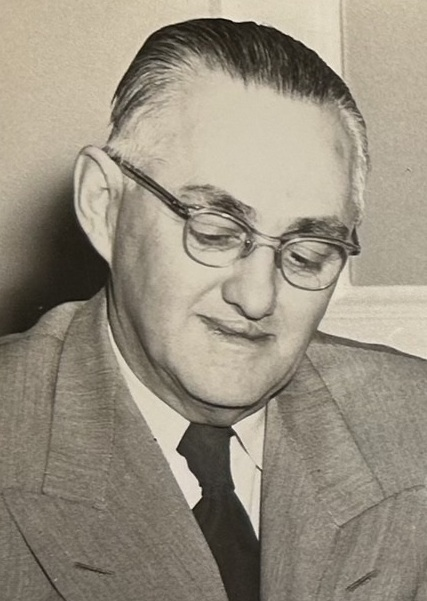
- Moran in 1953

30th Mayor of Burlington, Vermont
- In office June 6, 1949 – June 2, 1957
- In office June 1, 1948 – June 5, 1949 (Acting)
- Preceded by: John J. Burns
- Succeeded by: Claude Douglas Cairns

President of the Burlington, Vermont Board of Aldermen
- In office June 3, 1946 – June 7, 1948
- Preceded by: Raymond L. Beaulieu
- Succeeded by: Louis G. Lavalley (as President pro tempore)

Member of the Burlington, Vermont Board of Aldermen
- In office December 11, 1940 – April 5, 1949
- Preceded by: Bernard J. Leddy
- Succeeded by: Raymond A. Contois
- Constituency: Ward 4

Personal details
- Born: December 2, 1897 Burlington, Vermont, U.S.
- Died: March 12, 1962 (aged 64) Burlington, Vermont, U.S.
- Resting place: New Mount Calvary Cemetery, Burlington, Vermont
- Party: Democratic
- Spouse: Lauria Mary Brisson (m. 1920)
- Children: 4
- Parents: Edward H. Moran (father); Ellen Frances O'Neill (mother)
- Occupation: Retail store department manager

John Edward Moran, more commonly referred to as J. Edward Moran (December 2, 1897 – March 12, 1962), was an American politician who served as the 30th mayor of Burlington, Vermont.

== Life ==
John Edward Moran was born on December 2, 1897, in Burlington, Vermont, to Edward H. Moran and Ellen Frances O'Neill. He was educated in the parochial schools of Burlington. He worked at a variety of occupations in his younger years and spent the majority of his career with Abernethy Clarkson Wright, Inc., a Burlington department store, where he was a salesman, shipping clerk, and department manager.

Moran was long active in politics as a Democrat, including serving as a delegate to numerous state and national party conventions. In addition, Moran served as chairman of the Burlington City and Chittenden County Democratic Committees. He was an active member of the Knights of Columbus, Order of Alhambra, Society of the Holy Name, Elks Club, and Fraternal Order of Eagles.

In December 1940, Ward 4 Alderman Bernard J. Leddy resigned after being appointed an Assistant U.S. Attorney. Moran was the only candidate in the low turnout special election and won with all 68 votes cast for him. He served as an alderman from 1940 to 1949. He was serving as president of the Board of Aldermen when Mayor John J. Burns resigned to become Burlington's postmaster, elevating Moran to acting mayor. He was elected to a full two-year term in 1949, and won reelection in 1951, 1953, and 1955. In 1950, he was the unsuccessful Democratic nominee for Governor of Vermont. On March 5, 1957 Claude Douglas Cairns defeated Moran's bid for another term in an upset with 4,053 votes to 3,830.

In 1958, Moran was appointed as one of Burlington International Airport's managers. He was diabetic in his later years and died at DeGoesbriand Memorial Hospital on March 12, 1962, after suffering multiple heart attacks. After his death former mayor James E. Fitzpatrick and Mayor Robert K. Bing praised Moran for his service to the city.

== Family ==
In 1920, Moran married Lauria Mary Brisson (1898-1980) of Burlington. They were the parents of four children – Harold, Janice, Lorraine, and Katherine.

== Electoral history ==
1957 Burlington Mayoral Election
Party	Candidate	Votes	%
Republican	Claude Douglas Cairns	4,053	51.41%
Democratic	John Edward Moran	3,830	48.59%
Total votes		7,883	100%

Party political offices
Preceded by Peter J. Hincks	Democratic nominee for Vermont State Treasurer; 1948	Succeeded by Peter J. Hincks
Preceded by Charles F. Ryan	Democratic nominee for Governor of Vermont; 1950	Succeeded by Robert W. Larrow
Political offices
Preceded by John J. Burns	Mayor of Burlington, Vermont; 1948–1957	Succeeded by Claude Douglas Cairns
