= 1976 Vermont gubernatorial election =

- November 2, 1976
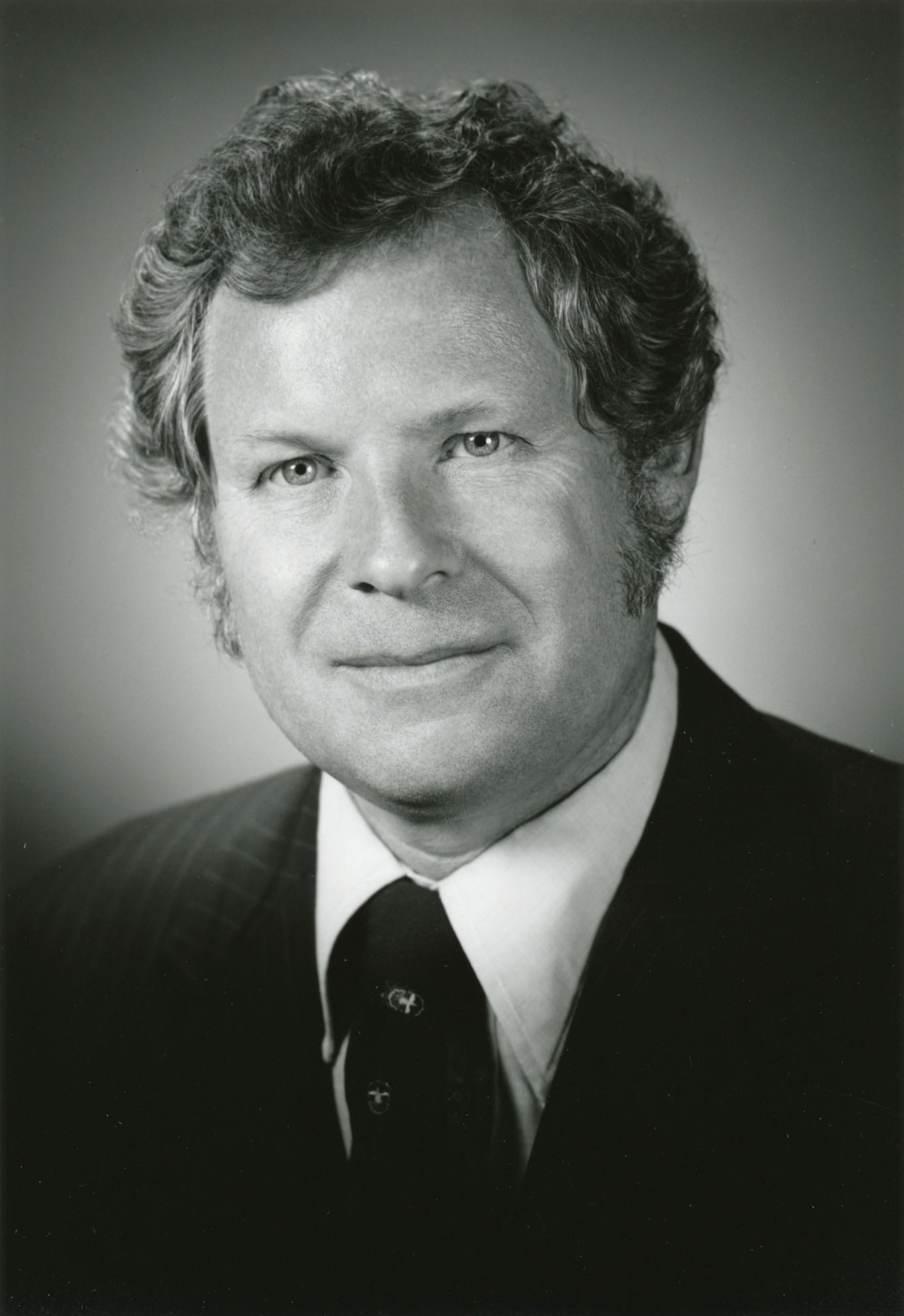

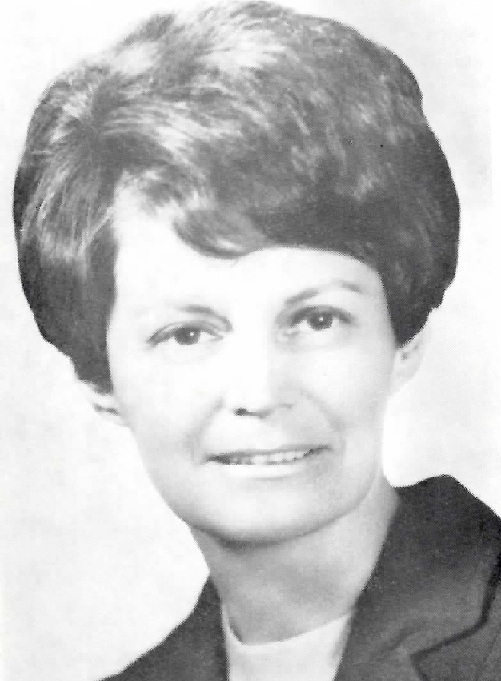

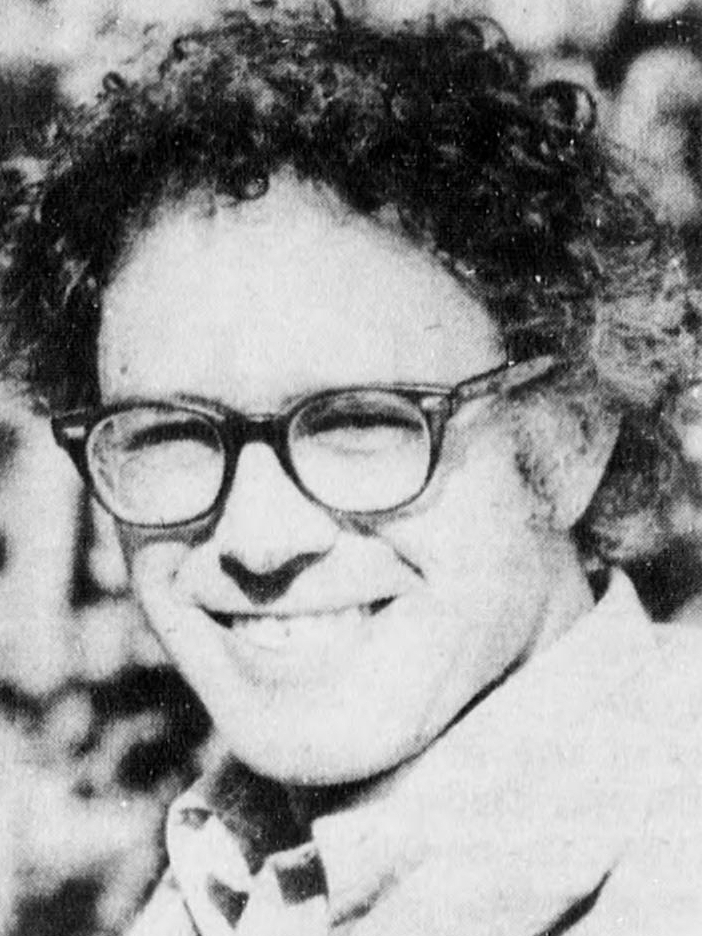
Nominee	Richard Snelling	Stella B. Hackel	Bernie Sanders
Party	Republican	Democratic	Liberty Union
Popular vote	99,268	75,262	11,317
Percentage	53.39%	40.48%	6.09%
- Snelling: 30–40% 40–50% 50–60% 60–70% 70–80% 80–90% Hackel: 40–50% 50–60% 60–70% 70–80%
Governor before election
Thomas P. Salmon
Democratic
Elected Governor
Richard Snelling
Republican

The 1976 Vermont gubernatorial election took place on November 2, 1976. Incumbent Democrat Thomas P. Salmon did not seek another term as Governor of Vermont, instead running for United States Senate. Republican candidate Richard A. Snelling won the election, defeating Democratic candidate Stella B. Hackel and Liberty Union candidate Bernie Sanders.

== Democratic primary ==
=== Candidates ===
- Brian D. Burns, Lieutenant Governor of Vermont
- Stella B. Hackel, Vermont State Treasurer
- Robert O'Brien, state senator

=== Results ===
Democratic primary results
Party	Candidate	Votes	%
Democratic	Stella B. Hackel	18,522	43.9
Democratic	Brian D. Burns	14,725	34.9
Democratic	Robert O'Brien	8,809	20.9
Democratic	Other	71	0.2
Total votes		42,127	100.0

== Republican primary ==
=== Results ===
Republican primary results
Party	Candidate	Votes	%	±%
Republican	Richard A. Snelling	24,279	72.0	
Republican	William G. Craig	9,429	28.0	
Total votes		33,708	100.0	

== Liberty Union primary ==
=== Results ===
Liberty Union primary results
Party	Candidate	Votes	%	±%
Liberty Union	Bernie Sanders	433	98.6	
Liberty Union	Other	6	1.4	
Total votes		439	100.0	

== General election ==
=== Results ===
1976 Vermont gubernatorial election
Party	Candidate	Votes	%	±%
Republican	Richard A. Snelling	98,206	52.82	
Bi-Partisan Vermonters	Richard A. Snelling	1,062	0.57	
Total	Richard A. Snelling	99,268	53.39	
Democratic	Stella B. Hackel	72,761	39.13	
Independent Vermonters	Stella B. Hackel	2,501	1.35	
Total	Stella B. Hackel	75,262	40.48	
Liberty Union	Bernie Sanders	11,317	6.09	
N/A	Other	82	0.04	
Total votes		185,929	100.0	
