= Brian D. Burns =

American politician (born 1939)

Brian Burns
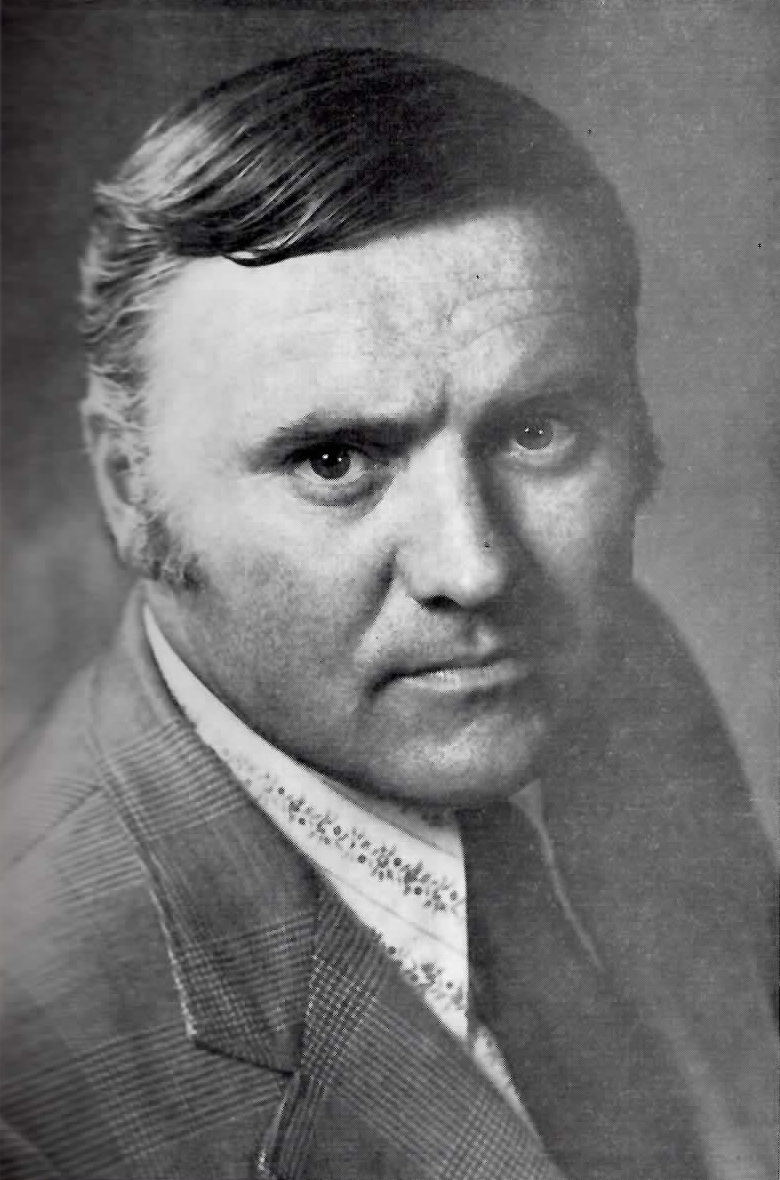

73rd Lieutenant Governor of Vermont
- In office January 1975 – January 1977
- Governor: Thomas P. Salmon
- Preceded by: John S. Burgess
- Succeeded by: T. Garry Buckley

Member of the Vermont House of Representatives
- In office 1967–1975

Personal details
- Born: November 17, 1939 (age 86) Burlington, Vermont, U.S.
- Party: Democratic
- Relations: John J. Burns (uncle)
- Education: University of Vermont (attended); Harvard University (MPA)
- Occupation: Real Estate Agent

Brian D. Burns (born November 17, 1939) is an American politician who served as the 73rd lieutenant governor of Vermont from 1975 to 1977 and as a member of the Vermont House of Representatives.

== Early life and education ==
Brian Douglas Burns was born in Burlington, Vermont, on November 17, 1939. He was the nephew of John J. Burns, an Irish-American who served as the mayor of Burlington, Vermont. After graduating from Burlington's Cathedral High School in 1958, Burns earned a bachelor's degree from the University of Vermont.

== Career ==
After graduating from the University of Vermont, Burns became active in the real estate business. He served in the United States Army and the Vermont National Guard in the late 1950s and early 1960s.

=== Politics ===
In 1966, Burns ran successfully for a seat in the Vermont House of Representatives. He served four terms, from 1967 to 1975. He was the Democratic nominee for Lieutenant Governor in 1974. he finished in first place, with 66,942 votes to Republican candidate T. Garry Buckley's 60,962 and 6,484 for Liberty Union Party nominee Arthur Deloy. Since Burns fell 256 votes short of the majority required by the state constitution, the contest was decided by the Vermont Legislature, which voted for Burns by a margin of 161 to 20. He served from January 1975 to January 1977.

Burns was an unsuccessful candidate for the Democratic nomination in the 1976 Vermont gubernatorial election, losing a three-way race to State Treasurer Stella Hackel. Hackel went on to lose the general election to Richard A. Snelling.

After leaving the Lieutenant Governor's office, Burns was employed as New England Director for the Farmers Home Administration.

Burns was an unsuccessful candidate in the 1985 Burlington mayoral election, coming in second in a three-way race that was won by Bernie Sanders. In 1988, Burns unsuccessfully sought a seat in the Vermont Senate.

From 1989 to 1993, Burns was a Program Manager for the Northeast Rural Water Association (NERWA). While in this position, he also completed a Master of Public Administration degree from the John F. Kennedy School of Government at Harvard University.

=== Conviction ===
In 1995, he was convicted of three counts of fraud for having claimed to be working full time for NERWA while he also claimed to be attending Harvard University full time, a requirement of the degree program. According to investigators, Burns misrepresented his work hours on daily NERWA time logs and used $5,000 in federal funds to pay for an apartment and $7,000 for travel expenses, in addition to $30,000 in salary while attending Harvard. He was sentenced to six months in jail and four months of home detention and ordered to pay restitution and court costs. He appealed but his conviction was affirmed.

== Sources ==
Party political offices
| Preceded by Leo J. Connor | Democratic nominee for Lieutenant Governor of Vermont; 1974 | Succeeded by John T. Alden |
Political offices
| Preceded by John S. Burgess | Lieutenant Governor of Vermont; 1975–1977 | Succeeded by T. Garry Buckley |
