= Earle McLaughlin =

Earle McLaughlin may refer to:

- W. Earle McLaughlin (1915–1991), Canadian banker
- Earle B. McLaughlin (1921–2003), American law enforcement officer
