= Emory A. Hebard =

Vermont State Treasurer

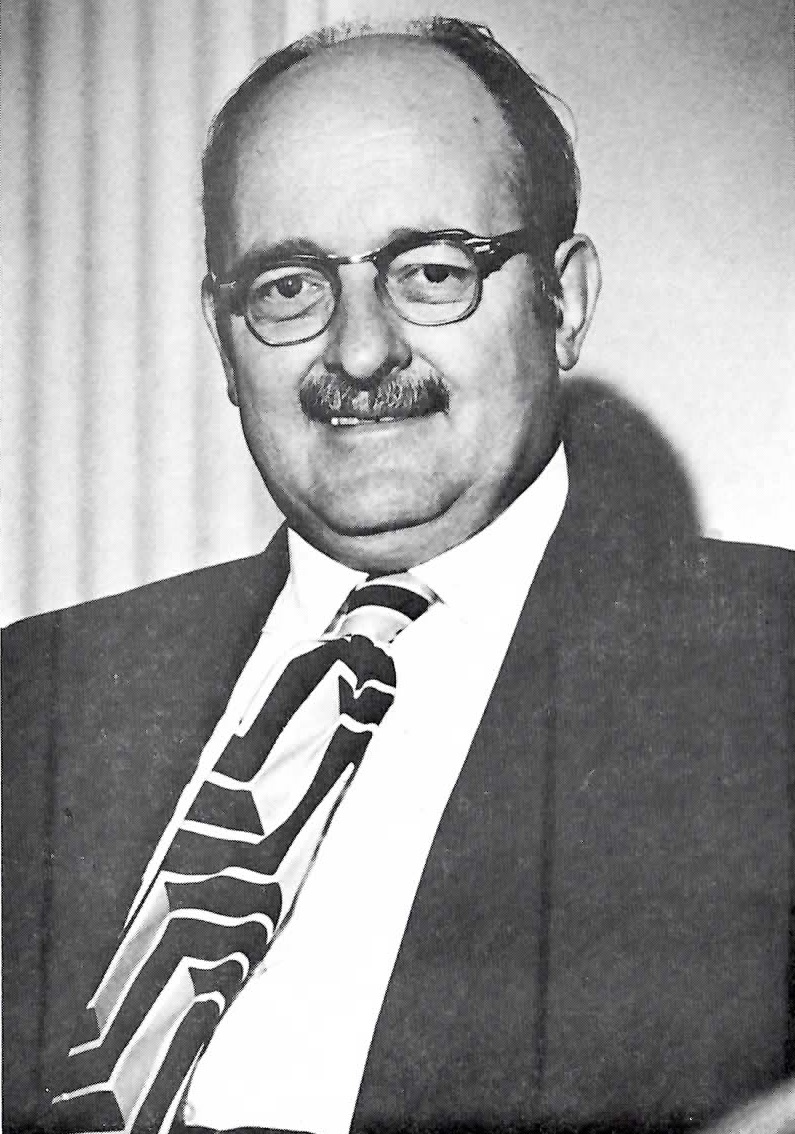

Vermont State Treasurer
- In office January, 1977 – January 1989
- Governor: Richard A. Snelling; Madeleine Kunin
- Preceded by: Stella Hackel
- Succeeded by: Paul W. Ruse Jr.

Personal details
- Born: September 28, 1917 Carmel, Maine, U.S.
- Died: November 1, 1993 (aged 76) Lebanon, New Hampshire, U.S.
- Party: Republican
- Spouse(s): Irma Mills (1914-1992) (m. 1941); Edith Cameron St. Onge (m. 1993)
- Children: 1
- Education: Middlebury College
- Profession: Store owner Real estate broker
- Nickname: "Em"

Military service
- Allegiance: United States
- Branch/service: United States Coast Guard Reserve
- Years of service: 1943-1972
- Rank: Lieutenant Commander
- Battles/wars: World War II; Korean War

Emory A. Hebard (September 28, 1917 – November 1, 1993) was an American businessman and politician who served as Vermont State Treasurer.

== Early life ==
Emory Amos Hebard was born in Carmel, Maine, on September 28, 1917, and raised in Northampton, Massachusetts. He graduated from Northampton High School in 1934 and Middlebury College in 1938, and was a member of Phi Beta Kappa.

He lived for a time in New York City, and was employed by the United States Department of Agriculture in Washington, D.C.

== Military service ==
During his student years Hebard was an anti-war activist, opposing U.S. intervention in Europe.

When the U.S. became involved in World War II, Hebard joined the United States Coast Guard. He remained in the Coast Guard Reserve following the war. Hebard was recalled to active duty for the Korean War and served from 1950 to 1952. Following this active duty tour, he continued with the Coast Guard Reserve, and attained the rank of lieutenant commander.

== Move to Vermont ==
Hebard moved to Vermont in 1947. He owned and operated Emory's Country Store in East Charleston from 1947 to 1950, and also served as East Charleston's Postmaster. From 1952 to 1963 he owned and operated Emory's Country Store in Glover. Hebard later operated a gift shop and an ice bar in Barton, worked as a real estate broker, and was Industrial Development Director for the Vermont Development Commission.

He also held local offices, including Town Meeting Moderator, School District Meeting Moderator, and Town Lister.

== Vermont House of Representatives ==
In 1960 Hebard was a successful Republican candidate for the Vermont House of Representatives. Elected when the House consisted of 246 members elected based on "one town, one representative," Hebard was named Chairman of the Reapportionment Committee by Speaker Franklin S. Billings, Jr. in 1965 when federal court decisions mandating proportional representation meant the creation of state legislative districts and the reduction of the House to 150 members.

Vermont was dominated by Republicans, and the House was controlled by Republicans from small towns, who overwhelmingly opposed reapportionment and the creation of districts because those changes threatened continued Republican and rural control. As the member from Glover, one of Vermont's smallest town at only 683 residents, and as a conservative Republican, Hebard could have been expected to oppose proportional representation. Instead, Billings and Hebard persuaded House members to support it with the argument that if Vermont did not solve the problem, the federal government and the courts would do it instead.

The reapportionment effort was successful and Hebard ran successfully for a seat in the reapportioned House in the 1965 special election, now a candidate from Glover and four other towns that were combined into a two-member district. He served in the House until 1969.

Hebard's district included Irasburg. The conservatism he displayed in the 1950s and 1960s included approval of the actions of local residents during the 1968 "Irasburg Affair," in which an African American minister was targeted by a campaign to force him out of Vermont. This effort included police harassment as well as an anonymous individual firing gunshots into the minister's home.

Hebard also disapproved of the Vermont-New York Project, an effort by Governor Philip H. Hoff and New York City Mayor John Lindsay to provide African American children from the city with a "country" experience by having them spend summers in Vermont. As Hebard indicated at the time, his motivations in the Irasburg Affair and Vermont-New York Project controversies was not racism, but a desire to blunt Hoff's popularity. Hoff, the first Democrat elected Governor of Vermont since the founding of the Republican Party in the 1850s, advocated progressive policies and was a likely United States Senate candidate, and Hebard hoped to return the governorship to Republican hands and keep both of Vermont's Senate seats Republican.

Hebard was Chairman of the Ways and Means Committee from 1967 to 1969. In 1968 he was an unsuccessful candidate for the Vermont State Senate. He returned to the House after the 1970 elections, and was chairman of the Appropriations Committee from 1973 to 1977. Former governor Madeleine Kunin later wrote that when she served on the Appropriations Committee during his chairmanship, Hebard was a mentor, giving her significant responsibilities despite her status as a member of the minority Democrats, and lobbying House colleagues to name Kunin as chairwoman of the committee after he left the House.

In 1975 Hebard ran unsuccessfully for Speaker of the Vermont House of Representatives, losing to Timothy J. O'Connor, Jr. O'Connor's victory was remarkable in that it marked the first time a Democrat had won the Speakership since the founding of the Republican Party in the 1850s, and came while Republicans were still the majority party in the House.

== Vermont State Treasurer ==
Hebard moved to Barton in the mid-1970s. When incumbent State Treasurer Stella Hackel decided to run for governor, Hebard ran successfully to succeed her in 1976, using the campaign slogan "Thrift is Still a Virtue," a line which took advantage of his carefully crafted image as a traditional New England, small town fiscal conservative.

During his term in office, Hebard was known for his attention to detail. According to longtime House colleague Melvin Mandigo, Hebard was known to drive to Boston to make state payments to the Bond Bank, rather than trust them to the mail.

He served as Treasurer until retiring in 1989. Contemplating retirement in 1987, Hebard contacted Paul W. Ruse Jr., the Town Manager and Director of Finance for the town of Springfield, Vermont, to offer him the position of Deputy State Treasurer. Ruse accepted, even though Hebard and he were from different political parties. In 1988 Hebard announced his retirement and endorsed Ruse as his successor, appearing in television ads to say Ruse was a worthy successor -- "for a Democrat."

== Death and burial ==
Hebard died in Lebanon, New Hampshire, on November 1, 1993, following complications from a heart attack. He is buried at Westlook Cemetery in Glover.

== Family ==
In 1941 Hebard married Irma Mills (1914–1992). They had one daughter, Sammy Maginnis Hebard.

In September, 1993 he married Edith Cameron St. Onge, who survived him.

== Legacy ==
The Vermont State Office Building in Newport is named for him.

Party political offices
| Preceded by Frank H. Davis | Republican nominee for Vermont State Treasurer; 1976, 1978, 1980, 1982, 1984, 1986 | Succeeded by Wayne Walker |
| Preceded by Stuart St. Peter | Democratic nominee for Vermont State Treasurer; 1978, 1980 | Succeeded by Andy Llana |
| Preceded by Andy Llana | Democratic nominee for Vermont State Treasurer; 1984, 1986 | Succeeded by Paul W. Ruse Jr. |
Political offices
| Preceded by Stella Hackel | Vermont State Treasurer; 1977–1989 | Succeeded by Paul W. Ruse Jr. |
