= 1950 Vermont gubernatorial election =

- November 7, 1950
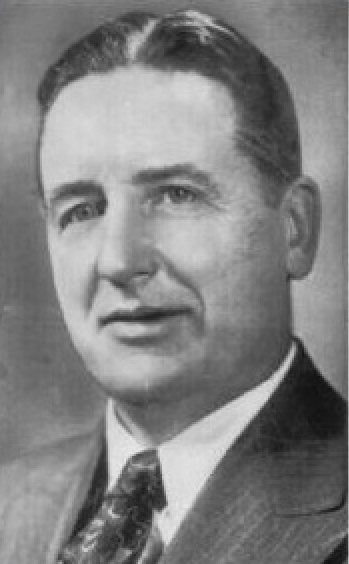

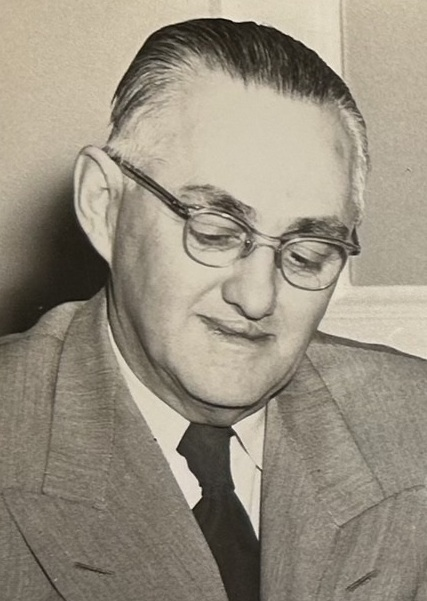
Nominee	Lee E. Emerson	J. Edward Moran
Party	Republican	Democratic
Popular vote	64,915	22,227
Percentage	74.48%	25.50%
- Emerson: 50–60% 60–70% 70–80% 80–90% 90-100% Moran: 50–60% 60–70% 80–90% No Vote/Data
Governor before election
Harold J. Arthur
Republican
Elected Governor
Lee E. Emerson
Republican

The 1950 Vermont gubernatorial election took place on November 7, 1950. Incumbent Republican Harold J. Arthur, who had become governor following the resignation of Ernest W. Gibson Jr., did not run for a full term as Governor of Vermont. Republican candidate Lee E. Emerson defeated Democratic candidate J. Edward Moran and succeeded Arthur.

== Republican primary ==
Results by county Emerson: 30–40% 40–50% 50–60% 60–70% 70–80% Stacey: 40–50% 50–60%

=== Candidates ===
- Peter Bove, Chief of the Vermont Liquor Board
- Lee E. Emerson, former Lieutenant Governor of Vermont
- J. Harold Stacey, Speaker of the Vermont House of Representatives

=== Endorsements ===
Peter Bove

Newspapers and publications

- St. Albans Daily Messenger

=== Results ===
Republican primary results
Party	Candidate	Votes	%	±%
Republican	Lee E. Emerson	30,868	43.14%	
Republican	J. Harold Stacey	24,886	34.78%	
Republican	Peter A. Bove	15,788	22.07%	
Republican	Other	5	0.01%	
Total votes		71,547	100.00%	

== Democratic primary ==
=== Results ===
Democratic primary results
Party	Candidate	Votes	%	±%
Democratic	J. Edward Moran	3,191	97.58%	
Democratic	Other	79	2.42%	
Total votes		3,270	100.00%	

== General election ==
=== Candidates ===
- Lee E. Emerson (Republican), former Lieutenant Governor of Vermont
- John Edward Moran (Democratic), Mayor of Burlington

=== Results ===
1950 Vermont gubernatorial election
Party	Candidate	Votes	%	±%
Republican	Lee E. Emerson	64,915	74.48	
Democratic	John Edward Moran	22,227	25.50	
N/A	Other	13	0.02	
Total votes		87,155	100.00	
