= Walter L. Kennedy =

American politician

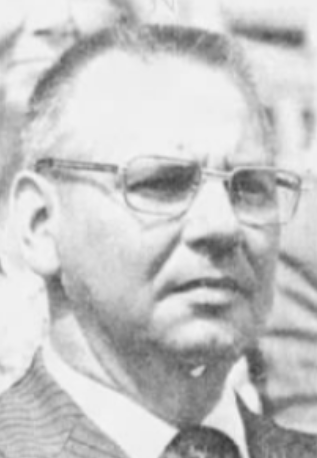
- Kennedy in 1974

Speaker of the Vermont House of Representatives
- In office 1971–1975
- Preceded by: John S. Burgess
- Succeeded by: Timothy J. O'Connor

Member of the Vermont House of Representatives
- In office 1961–1975
- Preceded by: F. Ray Keyser Jr. (from Chelsea)
- Succeeded by: John Howe (from Orange-1 District)
- Constituency: 35th District

Personal details
- Born: May 10, 1920 Chelsea, Vermont
- Died: January 22, 1997 (aged 76) Sarasota, Florida
- Resting place: Riverside Cemetery, Chelsea, Vermont
- Party: Republican
- Spouse(s): Phyllis Playful (m. 1943-1973, div.); Sylvia R. LeFevre (m. 1974-1997, his death)
- Children: 2
- Occupation: Automobile dealer

Walter L. Kennedy (May 10, 1920 – January 22, 1997) was a Vermont automobile dealer and politician who served two terms as Speaker of the Vermont House of Representatives.

== Biography ==
Walter Lawrence "Peanut" Kennedy was born in Chelsea, Vermont, on May 10, 1920. He graduated from Chelsea High School and worked at Pratt & Whitney in East Hartford, Connecticut. He served with the United States Army Air Forces during World War II, attaining the rank of Corporal, and afterwards returning to Chelsea.

Kennedy managed the Chelsea Co-Op Grocery and worked for American Home Foods until 1952, when he went into business as a car dealer. He soon became owner and operator of a Chrysler-Plymouth-Dodge-Jeep dealership, which became one of the largest car dealerships in Vermont.

A Republican, Kennedy was elected to the Vermont House of Representatives in 1960. He served seven terms, 1961 to 1975, and was Speaker of the House from 1971 to 1975.

In 1974, Kennedy was the unsuccessful Republican nominee for governor, losing to incumbent Thomas P. Salmon.

After losing the race for governor, Kennedy served as Chairman of the Vermont Republican Party from 1975 to 1976, and was an unsuccessful candidate for the Vermont House in 1976.

In retirement, Kennedy resided in Florida. He died in Sarasota on January 22, 1997.

Party political offices
Preceded by Luther Hackett	Republican nominee for Governor of Vermont; 1974	Succeeded by Richard A. Snelling
Political offices
Preceded by John S. Burgess	Speaker of the Vermont House of Representatives; 1971 – 1975	Succeeded by Timothy J. O'Connor, Jr.
