= Senator Mallory =

Senator Mallory may refer to:

== Members of the United States Senate ==
- Stephen Mallory (1813–1873), U.S. Senator from Florida from 1851 to 1861
- Stephen Mallory II (1848–1907), U.S. Senator from Florida from 1897 to 1907

== United States state senate members ==
- Mark Mallory (born 1962), Ohio State Senate

== See also ==
- Richard W. Mallary (1929–2011), Vermont State Senate
