= John S. Burgess =

American attorney and politician

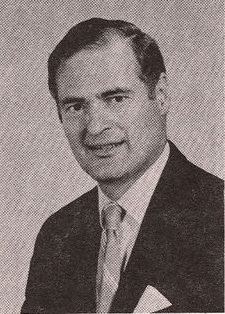
- From 1970 campaign for Lieutenant Governor

Lieutenant Governor of Vermont
- In office 1971–1975
- Governor: Deane C. Davis; Thomas P. Salmon
- Preceded by: Thomas L. Hayes
- Succeeded by: Brian D. Burns

Speaker of the Vermont House of Representatives
- In office 1969–1971
- Preceded by: Richard W. Mallary
- Succeeded by: Walter L. Kennedy

Member of the Vermont House of Representatives from District 4-5
- In office 1965–1971
- Preceded by: Anthony Buraczynski (from Brattleboro)
- Succeeded by: Robert R. J. Edmond

State's Attorney of Windham County, Vermont
- In office 1952–1957
- Preceded by: Edward A. John
- Succeeded by: Ernest W. Gibson III

Personal details
- Born: May 10, 1920 New York City, US
- Died: September 20, 2007 (aged 87) Keene, New Hampshire, US
- Resting place: Meeting House Hill Cemetery, Brattleboro, Vermont
- Party: Republican
- Spouse: Ronda H. Prouty (m. 1947)
- Children: 2
- Education: Northeastern University; University of Vermont
- Profession: Attorney

Military service
- Allegiance: United States
- Branch/service: United States Army Air Forces; United States Air Force; United States Air Force Reserve
- Years of service: 1941–1972
- Rank: Major
- Battles/wars: World War II; Korean War

John S. Burgess (May 10, 1920 – September 20, 2007) was an American attorney and politician from Vermont who served as Speaker of the Vermont House of Representatives (1969–1971) and the 72nd lieutenant governor of Vermont (1971–1975).

== Biography ==
John Stuart "Jack" Burgess was born in New York City on May 10, 1920. He was a bomber navigator in the U.S. Army Air Forces during World War II, served on active duty again during the Korean War, and attained the rank of Major in the Air Force Reserve.

Burgess received an LL.B. from Northeastern University in 1949, graduated from the University of Vermont with a BA in 1950, and became a lawyer in Brattleboro. He served as Windham County State's Attorney from 1952 to 1957. He also served in numerous local government positions in Brattleboro, including Town Agent, Town Attorney, and Justice of the Peace.

A Republican, he was an unsuccessful candidate for the nomination for Vermont Attorney General in 1962, losing to Charles E. Gibson Jr. He was elected to the Vermont House of Representatives in 1964, and reelected in 1966 and 1968; he was Chairman of the Judiciary Committee before serving as Speaker.

In 1970 Burgess was the successful Republican nominee for Lieutenant Governor and served two terms, 1971 to 1975. He lost the 1974 Republican primary for Vermont's seat in the U.S. House of Representatives to Jim Jeffords.

After leaving office Burgess continued to practice law and maintained his participation in Brattleboro's local government and civic activities. He also served as trustee and treasurer of Mark Hopkins College, which had been founded in 1964 by Walter F. Hendricks.

He died in Keene, New Hampshire on September 20, 2007, and was buried in Brattleboro's Meeting House Hill Cemetery.

Party political offices
Preceded by Thomas L. Hayes	Republican nominee for Lieutenant Governor of Vermont; 1970, 1972	Succeeded by T. Garry Buckley
Political offices
Preceded by Richard W. Mallary	Speaker of the Vermont House of Representatives; 1969–1971	Succeeded by Walter L. Kennedy
Preceded by Thomas L. Hayes	Lieutenant Governor of Vermont; 1971–1975	Succeeded by Brian D. Burns
