= Burlington High School (Vermont) =

Location
- 52 Institute Road Burlington, VT 05401, Burlington, Vermont, United States; 44.479064°N 73.2183143°W

Information
- Type: Public high school
- Motto: Freedom Through Education
- Established: 1964
- School district: Burlington School District
- Principal: Sabrina Westdjik
- Staff: 78.50 (FTE)
- Grades: 9–12
- Enrollment: 989 (2023-2024)
- Student to teacher ratio: 12.60
- Colors: Navy; White
- Team name: Seahorse
- Newspaper: The BHS Register
- Website: http://bhs.bsdvt.org

Burlington High School (BHS) is a public high school located in Burlington, Vermont, United States. BHS' current (since 1964) campus is its fourth. Two of the former buildings still exist, one (1900–1964) as the Edmunds Elementary and Middle School complex while the second one, used in the late 1800s, is now a private residence.

== Student life ==
=== Community service ===
Each student of BHS is expected to complete 40 hours of community service over his or her academic career. Community service fairs have been held at the school, with information about local organizations which need volunteers. A blood drive is hosted twice a year, with donation limited to students over age 16.

== Curriculum ==
Burlington High School requires the typical 24 credit load to graduate: 4 mandatory English, 3 mandatory science, 3 mandatory history, 3 mandatory math, 1 or 2 foreign languages (including French, German, Chinese, Spanish, and Latin) most reach level 2, 0.5 health, 1.5 gym, and 1 art or music (including band, computer science, chorus, clay, metals, and others). After these requirements have been completed, students are left with 5 elective credits to choose, which can span any of the aforementioned subjects.

=== Recognition ===
15 graduates qualified for national merit scholarships in 2008.

== Campus ==
The permanent Burlington High School is composed of 5 main buildings, labeled A, B, C, D, and E. There is also an F building, which contains Burlington Technical Center (BTC), a regional technical center that is attended by students from BHS as well as other high schools in the county. A building is the largest; it houses the school's cafeteria, gymnasium, music department, auditorium, and a few classrooms. B building is occupied by foreign-language and art classrooms, with the school's library on the first floor. C building is occupied by the English and the history departments, while E building is used by the mathematics and science departments. D building contains mostly exploratory programs, such as computer literacy and health. The campus closed in 2020 as in the course of renovations Polychlorinated biphenyl (PCB) deposits were found. As of 2021 the school administration is determining the future of the permanent site. As of that year athletic programs, extracurricular programs, and theater programs are being held at the permanent campus.

On March 4, 2021, a temporary campus opened in a former Macy's in Downtown Burlington, with the school district leasing the property for 3 1/2 years; as of that period all classes are taught at this location. The department store had closed in 2018, and $3.5 million was spent to renovate it, with the State of Vermont contributing. The warehouse and china department were retrofitted into being a gymnasium and a library, respectively. The classroom walls do not meet the ceiling. The campus is 2 miles (3.2 km) from the permanent one.

At a cost of approximately $206 million, the old school building was demolished and the new Burlington High School was built on the same site, opening in August 2026.

== Newspaper ==
Burlington High School is known throughout the community for its award-winning journalism program, which produces The BHS Register, a bi-weekly newspaper published in print and online. The program has produced five Al Neuharth Free Spirit Journalism Scholars over the past 10 years. The paper's extensive coverage of the teacher contract negotiations in fall 2016 was highly regarded. The publication was named the best student newspaper for a Class II school size by the New England Scholastic Press Association in May 2017.

== Sports ==
The sports teams include cross country, alpine, basketball, field hockey, hockey, lacrosse, baseball, Ultimate Frisbee, softball, tennis, football, figure skating, soccer, track (including indoor track), bowling and "longboat" (Cornish pilot gig) racing.

=== Recognition ===
- The basketball team won the Division 1 state championship in 1923, 1924, 1927, 1930, 1931, 1936, 1937, 1941, 1948, 1953, 1955, 1969, 1972, 1973, 1977, 1996, 2001, 2003, 2006, 2008, 2016, and 2025.
  - In 2007–08 they won all 24 games, the first Division I team in Vermont to have a perfect season in 25 years.
  - The team had a 37-game winning streak as of January 2009. The team was 59–2 since fall 2006. The only losses were to Rice. Rice's 6 losses in the same timeframe have been in games with BHS.
- The boys' tennis team won the Div. 1 championship in 1998, 1999, 2005 and 2006.
- Boys' baseball Division I state champions 1966, 1969, 1979, 1983, 1984
- Football team won Division I in 1967 and 1970.
- The football team won the Div. 2 state championship in 1964, 1974, 1999 and 2006
- Lacrosse won the Div. 2 title in 2007 and 2016
- Boys' soccer Division I 1987, 1996, 1997, 2008, 2017 and 2020.
- Boys' tennis Division I 1972, 1973, 1976, 1977, 1998, 1999, 2005, 2006
- Girls' tennis Division I 1979 and 1980
- Girls' Division I soccer state champions 2008
- Boys' Indoor Track Division 1 state indoor track champions, Winter 2009
- Boys' Outdoor Track Division 1 state outdoor track champions, Spring 2009 1973 ,1974 Back to back
- Boys' Division 1 Hockey won the state championship in 1971, 1972, 1985, and 1998.
- Boys' Ski Team won several state championships and were New England Champions in 1972.
- Boys' Volleyball won State championship in 2022.
- Boys' Cross-Country Team went undefeated 72–0 in regular season meets over several years in the early 1970s. They won Vermont State Championship titles in 1948–1950, 1953, 1955, 1956, 1970–1972, 1978, 1981, 1982. In 1972 the team tied for 2nd place at New England Championships and were 2nd again in 1982.
- Girls' Cross Country Team has won state championships in 1971, 1972, 1982 and 2002.
- Girls' lacrosse won the Division 1 title in 2015
- Co-Ed Bowling team were runner's up in 2021.

== Notable alumni ==
- Frederic W. Allen (1944), Chief Justice of the Vermont Supreme Court
- James R. Brickel (1947), United States Air Force Lieutenant general
- William Colby (1936), Director of Central Intelligence
- Selene Colburn (1988), politician
- Grace Coolidge (1898), First Lady of the United States
- John Dewey (1874), University of Vermont Phi Beta Kappa graduate, Doctor of Educational Philosophy (Johns Hopkins University), psychologist, educational leader, and professor
- TJ Donovan (1992), Attorney General of Vermont
- Fred Householder (1928), linguist
- Kevin Hunt (1967), former NFL offensive lineman
- Ilona Maher (2014), American Rugby Union player and Olympian
- Doug Racine (1970), state senator and lieutenant governor of Vermont
- John E. Rouille (1952), U.S. Marshal for Vermont
- Jessica Seinfeld (1989), author
- LJ Strenio (2007), professional freestyle skier
