= Luther F. Hackett =

American politician (1933–2018)

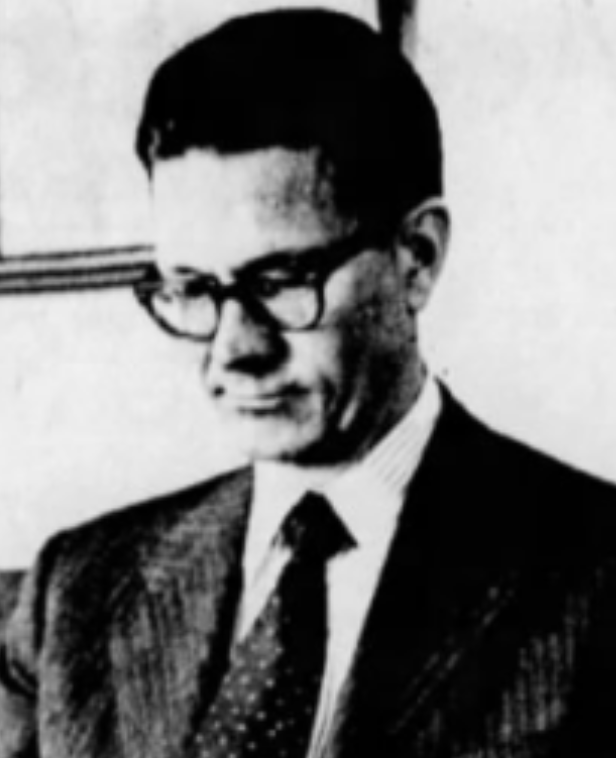
- Hackett in 1972

Member of the Vermont House of Representatives
- In office 1965–???

Personal details
- Born: June 20, 1933 Burlington, Vermont, U.S.
- Died: October 8, 2018 (aged 85)
- Party: Republican
- Education: University of Vermont

Luther F. Hackett (June 20, 1933 – October 8, 2018) was an American politician. He served as a Republican member of the Vermont House of Representatives.

== Life and career ==
Hackett was born in Burlington, Vermont. He attended Burlington High School and the University of Vermont.

In 1965, Hackett was elected to the Vermont House of Representatives.

In 1972, Hackett was a Republican candidate for governor of Vermont.

Hackett died in October 2018 of Alzheimer's disease, at the age of 85.
