= Paul W. Ruse Jr. =

Vermont State Treasurer

Vermont State Treasurer
- In office 1989–1995
- Preceded by: Emory A. Hebard
- Succeeded by: Jim Douglas

Personal details
- Born: September 13, 1943 (age 82) Springfield, Vermont, U.S.
- Party: Democratic
- Spouse: Carole Jane Lemire
- Children: 2
- Profession: Banker; Public official

Military service
- Service: United States Coast Guard
- Years of service: 1961–1965
- Rank: Petty officer third class
- Unit: USCGC Escanaba (WHEC-64)

Paul W. Ruse Jr. (born September 13, 1943) was a Vermont banker and public official. He is notable for having served three terms as Vermont State Treasurer from 1989 to 1995.

== Biography ==
Paul William Ruse Jr. was born in Springfield, Vermont on September 13, 1943. He was educated in Springfield, and graduated from Springfield High School in 1961. Ruse served in the United States Coast Guard from 1961 to 1965.

Ruse subsequently returned to Vermont and started a career in banking and finance as a manager trainee with Vermont National Bank. He became assistant manager of the Wilmington branch in 1969.

In 1970 Ruse became treasurer of the town of Springfield. He served until 1984, when he became the Springfield town manager and director of finance.

In 1987, incumbent Vermont State Treasurer Emory A. Hebard was contemplating retirement, and offered Ruse the position of deputy state treasurer. Ruse accepted, and served from 1987 to 1989.

== State Treasurer ==
Hebard, a Republican, announced his retirement in October 1987. He endorsed Ruse, calling him a worthy successor -- "for a Democrat".

Ruse won the 1988 election. He won reelection in 1990 and 1992, and served from January 1989 to January 1995.

During his tenure, Ruse was criticized for being too friendly with financial services firms that had an interest in matters handled by the state treasurer, including accepting campaign contributions from them, and appearing in an advertisement for one. Because of the controversy, in 1994 Ruse decided not to run for reelection. This decision was not widely known; Ruse stated that he withheld his decision not to run so that Ed Flanagan, the incumbent Vermont State Auditor, would not run for treasurer. Flanagan and Ruse had been involved in a behind the scenes dispute over details of an auditor's report about the treasurer's office; Flanagan disclaimed any interest in the treasurer's post.

As a result of Ruse's decision not to run again, only Republican Jim Douglas had filed as a major party candidate for treasurer; in the absence of a Democratic candidate, Douglas won the Democratic nomination by write in vote. In the general election, Douglas faced only token opposition, and received over 91% of the votes.

Ruse's deputy had retired in October 1994. After Douglas won the election, Ruse offered him the deputy's position so that Douglas would have an opportunity to learn the workings of the treasurer's office. Douglas accepted, and served as deputy state treasurer from November 1994 until beginning his term as treasurer in January 1995.

== Later career ==
After leaving the Vermont treasurer's position, Ruse served for several years as Chief Deputy Treasurer for the state of New Hampshire.

Party political offices
Preceded by Emory A. Hebard	Democratic nominee for Vermont State Treasurer; 1988, 1990, 1992	Succeeded by Jim Douglas
Political offices
Preceded by Emory A. Hebard	Vermont State Treasurer; 1989–1995	Succeeded by Jim Douglas
