= T. Garry Buckley =

American politician (1922–2012)

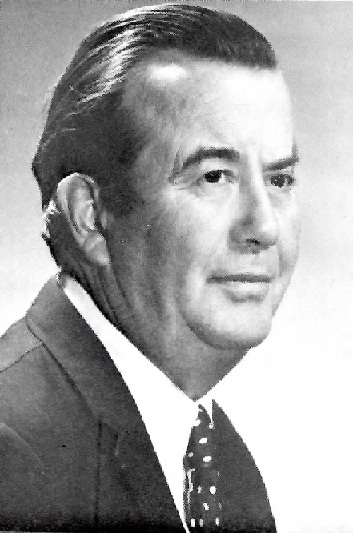

74th Lieutenant Governor of Vermont
- In office January 6, 1977 – January 10, 1979
- Governor: Richard Snelling
- Preceded by: Brian D. Burns
- Succeeded by: Madeleine Kunin

Member of the Vermont State Senate
- In office 1955-1959; 1969-1975

Personal details
- Born: September 13, 1922 Albany, New York, US
- Died: May 23, 2012 (aged 89) Stowe, Vermont, US
- Party: Republican
- Spouse: Frances Kingsbury Littlefield (m. 1945)
- Profession: Real estate broker Insurance agent

Military service
- Branch/service: United States Army Air Forces
- Years of service: 1942–1945
- Rank: Second Lieutenant

Thomas Garry Buckley (September 13, 1922 – May 23, 2012) was an American politician who served as the 74th lieutenant governor of Vermont between 1977 and 1979.

== Early life and education ==
T. Garry Buckley was born in Albany, New York, on September 13, 1922, the son of Christopher and Margaret Garry Buckley. His father owned several movie theaters in the Albany area and moved to Bennington in 1937, where he owned and operated the General Stark Theater. Buckley was educated at The Albany Academy, Bennington's high school, the Cranwell Preparatory School and Brown University. He left college to enlist for military service.

== Military service ==
Buckley served in the United States Army Air Forces during World War II, piloting troop carriers and gliders, and serving as an instructor pilot.

== Business career ==
After the war Buckley resided in Bennington and Dorset and was a real estate broker and insurance agent.

== Political career ==
A Republican, Buckley was elected to various local offices, including member of the Bennington County Planning Commission, Old Bennington village trustee, member of the village Highway Commission, and town selectman. Buckley was a member of the board of directors of the Bennington County Industrial Corporation and a trustee of the Bennington Museum. In 1950 Buckley supported state senator Henry Vail's unsuccessful primary campaign to incumbent Governor of Vermont Lee E. Emerson, and in that election cycle he ran unsuccessfully as an independent candidate for state representative.

He served in the Vermont State Senate from 1955 to 1959, and 1969 to 1975.

== Lieutenant Governor of Vermont ==
Buckley was elected lieutenant governor in 1976. He finished second in the popular vote to John T. Alden:

John T. Alden, Democrat: 82,632, 48.4%
T. Garry Buckley, Republican: 81,471, 47.6%
John L. Franco, Liberty Union 6,778, 4.0%

Since no candidate received a majority, the Vermont General Assembly was empowered to choose a winner. The Republican-controlled assembly chose Buckley. With 90 votes required for election the results were:

T. Garry Buckley, 90
John T. Alden, 87
John L. Franco, 1

In other such elections, the assembly has usually voted for the candidate who had the most popular votes. In the Alden-Buckley-Franco election, it later came to light that during the election, Alden, an insurance agent, was being investigated for fraud. This was not known publicly, but some legislators were likely aware, and this probably contributed to Buckley's victory. In 1978 Alden was convicted of diverting his clients' premium payments to his own use.

Buckley was defeated in the 1978 Republican primary for reelection by Peter P. Smith. In 1980 he lost a bid for the Republican U.S. Senate nomination. He retired and moved from Vermont to Vero Beach, Florida.

== Death ==
Buckley died on May 23, 2012, in Stowe, Vermont, at the age of 89. He was buried at Old Bennington Cemetery in Bennington.

== Family ==
Buckley married Frances Kingsbury Littlefield in 1945. They were the parents of five children, four sons and one daughter. For many years Buckley and his family resided in the home that had originally been built by Isaac Tichenor in the late 1700s.

After the death of his first wife, Buckley was married successively to Barbara Morgan, Patricia Mann, and Hesterley Black.

Party political offices
Preceded by John S. Burgess	Republican nominee for Lieutenant Governor of Vermont; 1974, 1976	Succeeded by Peter Plympton Smith
Political offices
Preceded by Brian D. Burns	Lieutenant Governor of Vermont; 1977–1979	Succeeded by Madeleine M. Kunin
