= Christian Hansen Jr. =

American politician and businessman (1931–2023)

United States Marshal for the District of Vermont
- In office 1982–1994
- Preceded by: Earle B. McLaughlin
- Succeeded by: John E. Rouille
- In office 1969–1977
- Preceded by: Thomas W. Sorrell
- Succeeded by: Earle B. McLaughlin

Member of the Vermont House of Representatives from the Windham 4–3 district
- In office January 7, 1981 – April 22, 1982
- Preceded by: Timothy J. O'Connor
- Succeeded by: Dart Everett

Personal details
- Born: October 6, 1931 Fitchburg, Massachusetts, U.S.
- Died: May 14, 2023 (aged 91) Bradenton, Florida, U.S.
- Resting place: Hillside Cemetery, Castleton, Vermont, U.S.
- Party: Republican
- Spouse: Nancy C. Fletcher (m. 1955–2021, her death)
- Children: 3
- Education: Fitchburg State University (attended); Stevens Business College (Fitchburg, Massachusetts) (attended)
- Occupation: Law enforcement officer

Military service
- Allegiance: United States
- Branch/service: United States Air Force
- Years of service: 1951-1955
- Rank: Staff Sergeant

Christian Hansen Jr. (October 16, 1931 – May 14, 2023) was an American businessman and government official from Vermont. A Republican, he was best known for his service as United States Marshal for the District of Vermont from 1969 to 1977 and again from 1982 to 1994.

== Early life ==
Christian Hansen Jr. was born in Fitchburg, Massachusetts, on October 16, 1931, a son of Christian Hansen Sr. and Margaret Hansen. He attended the schools of Fitchburg, and graduated from Fitchburg High School in 1949. Hansen attended Fitchburg State University and Stevens Business College of Fitchburg.

Hansen served in the United States Air Force from 1951 to 1955 and attained the rank of staff sergeant. He completed basic training at Sampson Air Force Base, New York, then carried out assignments at Lake City Air Force Station, Tennessee, and Donaldson Air Force Base, South Carolina.

== Start of career ==
After his military service, Hansen resided in Leominster and was employed by New England Telephone and Telegraph Company (NET&T); beginning as a business office representative in the company's Fitchburg office in 1955, he became a sales representative in 1957, then a corporate communications consultant, followed in February 1965 by promotion to business office manager in St. Albans, Vermont. In December 1965, Hansen was transferred to the business office manager's position at NET&T's office in Brattleboro. While residing in St. Albans, Hansen served as a deputy sheriff for Franklin County, and after moving to Brattleboro, he was a Windham County deputy sheriff.

Interested in politics as a Republican, in 1968 Hansen was active in the gubernatorial campaign of James L. Oakes. Oakes lost the Republican nomination to Deane C. Davis, after which Hansen was active in the successful Davis campaign. In March 1969, Hansen and his wife purchased a Brattleboro flower shop, Taylor for Flowers.

== United States Marshal ==
As a result of Hansen's connections to the Republican Party, when Republican Richard Nixon assumed the presidency in January 1969, Hansen was considered for appointment as Vermont's United States Marshal. Vermont's senior U.S. Senator, Republican George Aiken, considered Hansen and Howard P. Lunderville, a member of the Vermont House of Representatives from Williston, and decided to recommend Hansen. Nixon nominated Hansen in May 1969, and he was confirmed in June. After Nixon was reelected in 1972, he nominated Hansen for a second term, which was confirmed in October 1973. He served until August 1977, when President Jimmy Carter, a Democrat, nominated Earle B. McLaughlin, the sheriff of Chittenden County, to succeed Hansen.

== Later career ==
After leaving the Marshal's office, Hansen was the owner and operator of Avenue Grocery Store in Brattleboro. In 1978, he was an unsuccessful candidate for the Republican nomination for Windham County assistant judge. In 1980, he was the successful Republican nominee to succeed Timothy J. O'Connor as the Windham 4-3 district member in the Vermont House of Representatives. Hansen served in the House from January 7, 1981 to April 22, 1982, and was succeeded by Dart Everett.

== Return to Marshal's office ==
In 1980, Republican Ronald Reagan won the presidency and in December 1981 he appointed Hansen to succeed Earle McLaughlin as Vermont's U.S. Marshal. He was confirmed by the U.S. Senate in March 1982 and was sworn in on April 26.

During his second tenure as Marshal, Hansen relocated from Brattleboro to South Burlington. Hansen continued to serve until September 1994. President Bill Clinton, a Democrat, took office in January 1993, and in October 1994 he appointed John E. Rouille as Hansen's successor. In retirement, Hansen became a resident of Rutland and spent winters in Florida.

== Personal life and death ==
In 1955, Hansen married Nancy C. Fletcher (1934–2021). They were the parents of three children— Susan, Cindy, and Mark.

Hansen died in Bradenton, Florida, on May 14, 2023. Hansen was buried at Hillside Cemetery in Castleton, Vermont.
