= John H. Sinclair (police officer) =

US Marshal for Vermont

United States Marshal for the District of Vermont
- In office 1999–2002
- Nominated by: Bill Clinton
- Preceded by: John E. Rouille
- Succeeded by: John R. Edwards

Commander of the Vermont State Police
- In office 1996–1999
- Nominated by: Howard Dean
- Preceded by: Lane Marshall
- Succeeded by: Thomas Powlovich

Personal details
- Born: 1946 (age 79–80) Los Angeles, California, US
- Spouse: Barbara Ann (Ball) Marquis (m. 1976)
- Children: 2
- Education: University of Vermont
- Profession: Law enforcement officer

John H. Sinclair (born 1946) is a retired American law enforcement officer from Vermont. He was active from 1969 to 2002, and served as Commander of the Vermont State Police from 1996 to 1999 and United States Marshal for the District of Vermont from 1999 to 2002.

== Biography ==
John Hollingsworth Sinclair was born in Los Angeles in 1946, a son of John William Sinclair and Carlotta E. Lamer. He is a 1964 graduate of Valley Forge Military Academy and worked for Vermont Transit Lines in Burlington, Vermont while attending the University of Vermont (UVM). In 1970, he received his Bachelor of Science degree in business administration from UVM.

In November 1969, Sinclair joined the Vermont State Police (VSP). Sinclair served with the VSP until 1999, and his career included postings as a uniformed trooper at the Colchester and Bethel Barracks, member of the department's fraud unit, and member of the governor's security detail. As he advanced through the ranks, Sinclair went on to become station commander at the Brattleboro barracks and assistant commander of the VSP's criminal division. He was commander of the criminal division from 1988 to 1990, and commander of its field force from 1990 to 1996. In 1996, he was appointed to command the Vermont State Police.

In 1999, Sinclair was a resident of Charlotte when US Senator Patrick Leahy recommended him to President Bill Clinton for appointment as United States Marshal for the District of Vermont. Clinton made the nomination, which was then confirmed by the US Senate. Sinclair served as marshal until 2002, when he retired.

=== Legacy ===
The Vermont State Police presents the Colonel John H. Sinclair Award to troopers who attain "superior" ratings on six consecutive physical fitness tests.
