= LJ Strenio =

John “LJ” Strenio, born on February 8, 1989, in Burlington, Vermont, is a professional freestyle skier who is featured in numerous feature-length films and competes professionally around the world.

== Biography ==
Strenio was born on February 8, 1989, in Burlington, Vermont. He started skiing at the young age of 7 at Smuggler's Notch, Vermont, and quickly was skiing competitively. In high school, he attended an academy with a renowned freestyle program called Waterville Valley Academy in New Hampshire. While Strenio attended the freestyle portion of the program, the school's tuition was too high for him, so he brought his school work from Burlington High School in Vermont to the academy in New Hampshire to work through his assignments with a tutor. His freestyle skiing career began at the age of 16 when he won the 3rd Avila Young Gun Open, beating out over 100 other competitors and gaining him exposure in the freestyle skiing community.

In the same year, he entered Level 1's Super Unknown III ski edit contest but lost to Michael Clarke. While still in high school, he began filming with east coast film company Meathead Films and has been featured in their movies Born from Ice, Snow Gods, Wanderland, Wild Stallions, Work it Out, Head for the Hills, and Prime Cut. After graduating from high school, he attended the University of Utah pursuing a dual major in English and Film. His school life is balanced with a busy schedule in competing and filming in freestyle skiing. In an interview with ESPN, LJ Strenio brought up how chaotic things could be with his schedule. He would sometimes have to pass up filming segments due to conflicts with his contest schedule.

== Film career ==
Besides his long relationship with Meathead Films, Strenio has been featured in Poor Boys Production's films Revolver and his first full segment in Grand Bizarre. In addition, he films with Salt Lake City based 4BI9 Media and Rage Films Pretty Good. Strenio is known as well for his appearances in multiple online videos. He has made frequent appearances on the popular web series Line Traveling Circus from his initial appearance in episode 1.3 The incredible Journey NY to CO . Strenio has been featured in six episodes each exceeding 60,000 views as of 4/14/2012. Additionally, he is in the online videos: 10-11 LJ Strenio season edit pt1, 10-11 LJ Strenio season edit pt2, 12 Crazy Days of Christmas, JOSS Entry LJ Strenio, JOSS Team Newschoolers.

== Competitive career ==
His 2010 JOSS (Jon Olsson Super Sessions) video entry earned him a spot on the JOSS Team Newschoolers alongside X Games Gold medalist Gus Kenworthy and Matt Walker. His video entry to King of Style 2010 placed him in the five finalists to compete in King of style. Furthermore, Strenio won the 3rd, 4th, and 5th Rails to Riches rail jams held annually at Killington Resort in Vermont. He competed in the Dew Tour 2010-11 and 2011–12, and placed 3rd at WSI 2009 and 8th WSI 2011. Additionally, he competed in the Denver Big Air. In the Readers Poll Skier of the Year, LJ Strenio made it to the round of 16. His unique, upbeat style and attitude and technical tricks have given him a wide audience. LJ Strenio was nominated for best manmade air, and best jib in the annual 2012 Powder Magazine awards. He was on the front page of Europe’s Skiing Magazine. In 2010, he competed in his first marathon, The Layton Marathon. He placed 2nd for the 20-24 age division with a time of 3:25:37.4.

== Injuries ==
Strenio injured his wrist and had to have surgery and wear a cast for two years. In April 2010, he also tore his ACL, ending his season. He injured a knee again filming in Finland 2012. The injury, a shattered kneecap was the worst injury of his career. Finnish doctors told him he would never ski again. LJ skied again.

== Coaching ==
During the summers, he regularly coaches at freestyle skiing camps including Axis Freeride water ramps in Salt Lake City, Camp of Champions in British Columbia, Canada, and Windells in Mount Hood, Oregon.

== Charity ==
In 2011 following the devastation of Hurricane Irene, a limited number of photos from the Meathead film Prime Cut were sold by Ski the East with the profits donated to the Mad River Valley Community Fund to provide flood relief for those affected by the hurricane.

== Sponsors ==
His sponsors are Powder Huffer, O'Neill, Giro, Line Skis, Scott, EC headwear, and Ski the East.
