= 1972 Vermont gubernatorial election =

- November 7, 1972
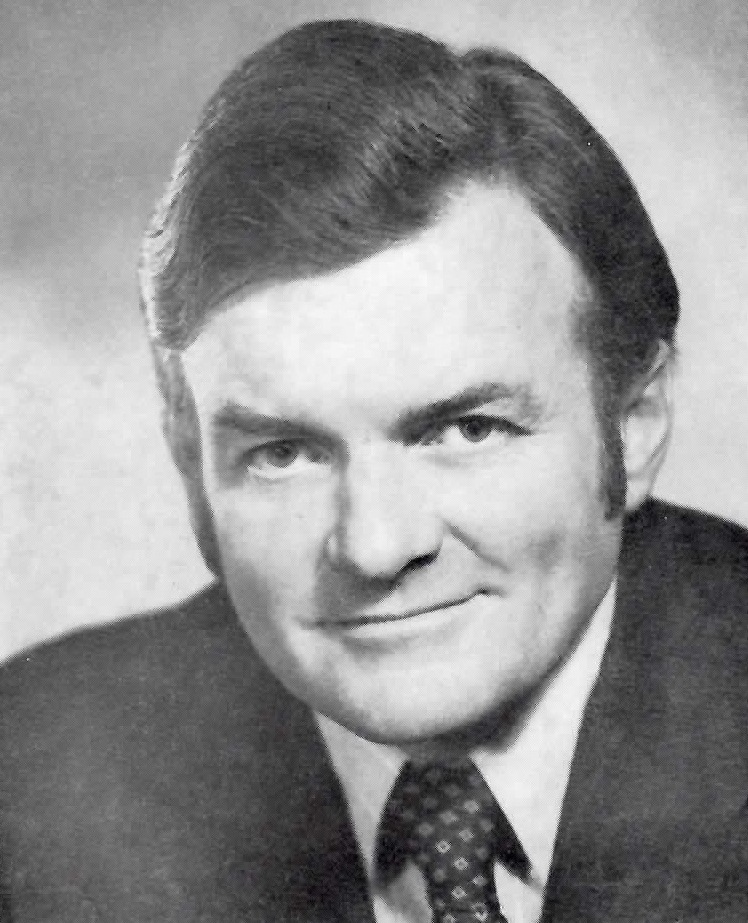

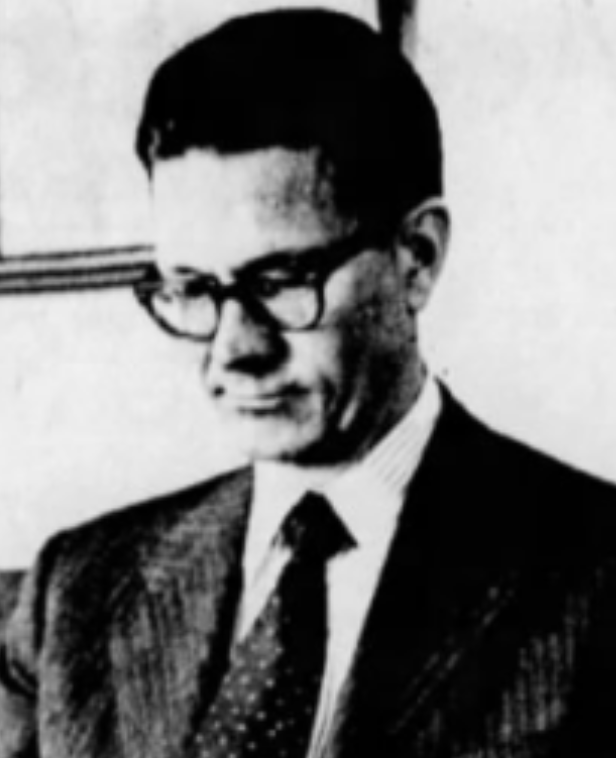
| Nominee | Thomas P. Salmon | Luther F. Hackett |
| Party | Democratic | Republican |
| Popular vote | 104,533 | 82,491 |
| Percentage | 55.24% | 43.59% |
- County results Salmon: 40–50% 50–60% 60–70% Hackett: 40–50% 50–60%
Governor before election
Deane C. Davis
Republican
Elected Governor
Thomas P. Salmon
Democratic

The 1972 Vermont gubernatorial election took place on November 7, 1972. The incumbent Republican Governor Deane C. Davis was not a candidate for re-election to another term as governor of Vermont. The Democratic nominee, Thomas P. Salmon, defeated the Republican nominee, Luther F. Hackett, to become his successor. Future U.S. senator and presidential candidate Bernie Sanders ran as a member of the Liberty Union Party.

== Republican primary ==
=== Results ===
Republican primary results
| Party | Candidate | Votes | % | ±% |
|---|---|---|---|---|
| Republican | Luther F. Hackett | 33,323 | 54.4 | |
| Republican | James M. Jeffords | 27,902 | 45.5 | |
| Republican | Other | 46 | 0.1 | |
| Total votes | | 61,271 | 100.00 | |

== Democratic primary ==
=== Results ===
Democratic primary results
| Party | Candidate | Votes | % | ±% |
|---|---|---|---|---|
| Democratic | Thomas P. Salmon | 10,552 | 99.0 | |
| Democratic | Other | 109 | 1.0 | |
| Total votes | | 10,661 | 100.00 | |

== General election ==
=== Results ===
1972 Vermont gubernatorial election
| Party | Candidate | Votes | % | ±% |
|---|---|---|---|---|
| Democratic | Thomas P. Salmon | 101,751 | 53.77 | |
| Independent Vermonters | Thomas P. Salmon | 2,782 | 1.47 | |
| Total | Thomas P. Salmon | 104,533 | 55.24 | |
| Republican | Luther F. Hackett | 82,491 | 43.59 | |
| Liberty Union | Bernie Sanders | 2,175 | 1.15 | |
| N/A | Other | 38 | 0.02 | |
| Total votes | | 189,237 | 100.00 | |
