= C. Douglas Cairns =

American politician

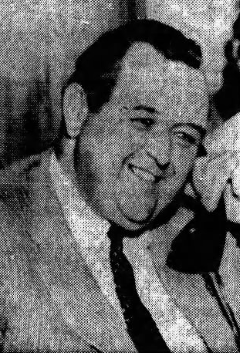
- Cairns in 1957, as mayor-elect

31st Mayor of Burlington, Vermont
- In office June 3, 1957 – June 1, 1959
- Preceded by: John Edward Moran
- Succeeded by: James E. Fitzpatrick

Personal details
- Born: June 1, 1914 Salem, Massachusetts, U.S.
- Died: July 6, 1985 (aged 71) Burlington, Vermont, U.S.
- Resting place: Lakeview Cemetery, Burlington, Vermont
- Party: Republican
- Spouse: Frances Mary Nason
- Parents: Claude Cairns (father); Mae Lewis (mother)

Military service
- Allegiance: United States
- Branch/service: United States Navy
- Years of service: 1941-1945
- Battles/wars: World War II

Claude Douglas Cairns (June 1, 1914 – July 6, 1985) was an American politician who served as the 31st mayor of Burlington, Vermont. His mayoral victory in 1957 ended eighteen years of Democratic control of Burlington's mayoralty since Republican Louis Fenner Dow left office in 1939.

== Life ==
Claude Douglas Cairns was born in Salem, Massachusetts on June 1, 1914 to Mae Lewis and Claude F. Cairns. In 1932 he graduated from the Chauncey Hall Preparatory School and received a degree in chemical engineering from the Massachusetts Institute of Technology in 1936. From 1941 to his honorary discharge in 1945 he served in the United States Navy on board the USS Block Island in the Atlantic.

From 1953 to 1957 Cairns served two terms as on the Burlington Board of Aldermen. On April 27, 1956 he was elected as Chairman of the Burlington Republican City Committee to succeed John B. Harrington. In September he proposed adding the support of lowering the voting age to eighteen to the Vermont Republican Party platform.

On February 18, 1957 he was given the mayoral nomination and on March 5 defeated incumbent Democratic Mayor John Edward Moran with 4,053 votes to 3,830 votes. On January 28, 1958 he stated that he would not run for congress, but on April 30 he changed his decision and announced that he would run in the Republican primary for the House of Representatives and went on to lose the primary to former Governor Harold J. Arthur. During his tenure as mayor he attempted to have a nuclear reactor built in Burlington and went to the Joint Committee on Atomic Energy, but nothing came of it and attempted to add support for a national sales tax to the 1958 Republican national platform. On February 2, 1959 he announced that he would not to seek reelection and would instead run for alderman again and easily defeated Arthur J. Lambert with 1,434 votes to 856 votes. After leaving the mayoralty he was elected as Chairman of the Chittenden County Republican Party.

In 1964 he ran for one of Chittenden County's five state senate seats, but came in seventh place out ten candidates.

During the 1960 and 1968 he organized the presidential campaigns of Richard Nixon in Vermont. During the 1964 campaign he was an early supporter of Barry Goldwater and served as chairman and member of the Vermont delegation to the national convention in support of Goldwater although the delegates were officially uncommitted. He attempted to become the Republican national committeeman for Vermont, but was defeated by incumbent State Senator Edward G. Janeway. He also ran Barry Goldwater's campaign in Vermont in 1964 and served as both his vice chairman of his campaign in Vermont and national campaign's chairman in 1964. Late into the campaign he led an effort to block the Citizens Party from giving its nomination and extra ballot access line to Lyndon B. Johnson.

Cairns died in Burlington, Vermont July 6, 1985 at age 71.

== Electoral history ==
Claude Douglas Cairns electoral history

1957 Burlington Mayoral Election
Party	Candidate	Votes	%
Republican	Claude Douglas Cairns	4,053	51.41%
Democratic	John Edward Moran	3,830	48.59%
Total votes		7,883	100%

1958 Vermont House of Representatives Republican primary
Party	Candidate	Votes	%
Republican	Harold J. Arthur	14,460	30.23%
Republican	A. Luke Crispe	11,210	23.43%
Republican	Claude Douglas Cairns	9,221	19.28%
Republican	Harris E. Thurber	9,105	19.03%
Republican	Hester O'Neill	2,151	4.50%
Republican	George M. Abbott	1,666	3.48%
Republican	Other	23	0.05%
Total votes		47,836	100%

1959 Burlington Ward 6 Alderman Election
Party	Candidate	Votes	%
Republican	Claude Douglas Cairns	1,434	62.62%
Democratic	Arthur J. Lambert	856	37.38%
Total votes		2,290	100%

1964 Chittenden County Vermont State Senate Election
Party	Candidate	Votes	%
Democratic	John O'Brien	19,438	13.36%
Democratic	Charles L. Delaney	18,945	13.02%
Democratic	Hector T. Marcoux	18,495	12.71%
Democratic	George R. J. McGregor	18,304	12.58%
Democratic	John Kelty	18,268	12.56%
Republican	Holger C. Petersen	10,962	7.53%
Republican	Claude Douglas Cairns	10,754	7.39%
Republican	E. Howard Chittenden	10,403	7.15%
Republican	C. Reginald Burns	10,008	6.88%
Republican	Clinton M. Russell	9,919	6.82%
Total votes		145,496	100%

Political offices
Preceded by John Edward Moran	Mayor of Burlington, Vermont; 1957–1959	Succeeded by James E. Fitzpatrick
