= John E. Rouille =

United States Marshal for Vermont

United States Marshal for the District of Vermont
- In office September 29, 1994 – November 29, 1999
- Preceded by: Christian Hansen Jr.
- Succeeded by: John H. Sinclair

Personal details
- Born: February 7, 1932 Burlington, Vermont, U.S.
- Died: May 28, 2024 (aged 92) Burlington, Vermont, U.S.
- Resting place: New Mount Calvary Cemetery, Burlington, Vermont, U.S.
- Party: Democratic
- Spouse: Joyce Marcy LaVallee (m. 1953)
- Children: 5
- Education: Champlain College (attended)
- Occupation: Law enforcement officer United States Senate staffer
- Military career
- Service: United States Marine Corps Reserve
- Service years: 1950–1958
- Rank: Corporal
- Service number: 1034496
- Units: 1st Marine Division; 1st Marine Corps District

John Edward Rouille (February 7, 1932 – May 28, 2024) was an American law enforcement officer and United States Senate staff member from Vermont. A longtime aide to Patrick Leahy during Leahy's career as a prosecutor and U.S. senator, Rouille served as United States Marshal for the District of Vermont from 1994 to 1999.

== Early life ==
John Edward Rouille was born in Burlington, Vermont on February 7, 1932, the son of John Oliver Rouille and Beatrice Evelyn (Barber) Rouille. He was raised and educated in Burlington, and attended Burlington High School. He left high school early to join the military during the Korean War. Rouille enlisted in the United States Marine Corps Reserve in 1950 and spent 18 months on active duty before returning to Vermont. He served in reserve units in Vermont, Massachusetts, and New York until 1958, and attained the rank of corporal.

== Career ==
After returning from his active military service, Rouille completed his high school education at Burlington High School in 1952. He subsequently completed courses at Champlain College in Burlington. At the start of his career, he worked for several Burlington-area companies, including General Electric (1952 to 1955, 1960 to 1963), the Tulatex Corporation (1955 to 1960), and the Bader Company (1970 to 1972). He was employed by the Burlington Police Department (BPD) from 1964 to 1965, and again from 1972 to 1975. During his second stint with the BPD, he was assigned as an investigator in the office of Patrick Leahy, the state's attorney of Chittenden County.

When Leahy was elected to the U.S. Senate in 1974, he hired Rouille as a member of his staff, responsible for liaison activity on veterans and military issues. In 1994, Leahy announced his intent to recommend Leo P. Blais of Essex as Vermont's U.S. Marshal, succeeding Christian Hansen Jr. When Blais withdrew from consideration, Leahy recommended Rouille, who briefly served as acting marshal while awaiting confirmation. President Bill Clinton made the appointment, which was subsequently confirmed by the U.S. Senate. Rouille served until retiring in November 1999, and was succeeded by John H. Sinclair.

== Later life ==
After retiring, Rouille continued to reside in Burlington. He volunteered for several organizations and causes, including St. Anthony Christ the King church, South Burlington's Vet Center, and Toys for Tots.

He died in Burlington on May 28, 2024. Rouille was buried at New Mount Calvary Cemetery in Burlington.

== Family ==
On August 1, 1953, Rouille married Joyce Marcy LaVallee (April 22, 1934 – March 8, 2012). They were the parents of five children: Mary Patricia, Kathleen, Gregory, Melinda, and Jay.
