= Frank H. Davis =

American politician

- Born: June 13, 1910; New York City, US
- Died: April 2, 1979 (aged 68); Burlington, Vermont, US
- Occupations: businessman public official
- Spouses: Katharine Simmons (m. 1931; div. 1938) Virginia Hewitt (m. 1942)
- Children: 6
- Relatives: Frank Hastings Hamilton (great-grandfather)

Frank H. Davis (June 13, 1910 – April 2, 1979) was an American businessman and public official. He was notable for his service as Vermont State Treasurer for three terms.

== Biography ==
Frank Hamilton Davis was born in New York City on June 13, 1910, the son of Frank Hamilton Davis and Elizabeth Wilson Clark. His parents divorced in 1917, and he was raised by his mother and stepfather, Walter Guest Kellogg. Davis attended the public schools of New York City and St. Paul's School in Concord, New Hampshire.

Davis began a career in finance, and he soon purchased a seat on the New York Stock Exchange as a representative of the Carlisle & Jacquelin firm.

== World War II ==
In 1942 Davis sold his seat on the stock exchange and joined the United States Coast Guard Reserve for World War II. He served in both the Atlantic and Pacific theaters, received a commission, and was discharged at the end of the war with the rank of lieutenant.

== Move to Vermont ==
Davis moved to Vermont after the war. He became active in several business ventures in Burlington, including the state's first self-service, coin-operated laundromat. He was also an account executive in the financial services industry, first with F. I. DuPont, and later with the W. E. Hutton firm. He was active in civic affairs, including service as chairman of the Burlington Housing Authority. Davis attended Burlington's Church Street Congregational Church, and served as a deacon.

A Republican, he served on the Burlington and Chittenden County Republican committees, and was treasurer of the Burlington Republican Party. He also attended numerous local, state and national conventions, and was active in Barry Goldwater’s 1964 campaign for president. Davis served in the Vermont House of Representatives from 1966 to 1969. In 1968 he won election as state Treasurer. He was reelected twice, and served from 1969 to 1975; he was an unsuccessful candidate for reelection in 1974. In the 1974 contest, Democrat Stella Hackel received 66,553 votes (49.68%), Davis received 61,181 (45.67%), and Liberty Union Party candidate Ron MacNeil had 6,229 (4.65%). Because no candidate won a majority of the popular votes, as required by the Vermont Constitution, the election was decided by the Vermont General Assembly. The legislature almost always selects the candidate who received a plurality in the general election, which they did in this contest by voting for Hackel over Davis, 164 to 16.

== Family ==
In 1931, Davis married Katharine Simmons. They were the parents of two children, and divorced in 1938.

Davis married Virginia Hewitt in 1942. They were the parents of four children.

Davis was the great-grandson of Frank Hastings Hamilton.

== Retirement and death ==
After leaving office, Davis lived in retirement in Burlington. He died in Burlington on April 2, 1979.

Party political offices
Preceded by John R. Perry	Republican nominee for Vermont State Treasurer; 1968, 1970, 1972, 1974	Succeeded by Emory A. Hebard
Political offices
Preceded by Madelyn Davidson	Vermont State Treasurer; 1969–1975	Succeeded by Stella Hackel
