= 1974 Vermont gubernatorial election =

- November 5, 1974
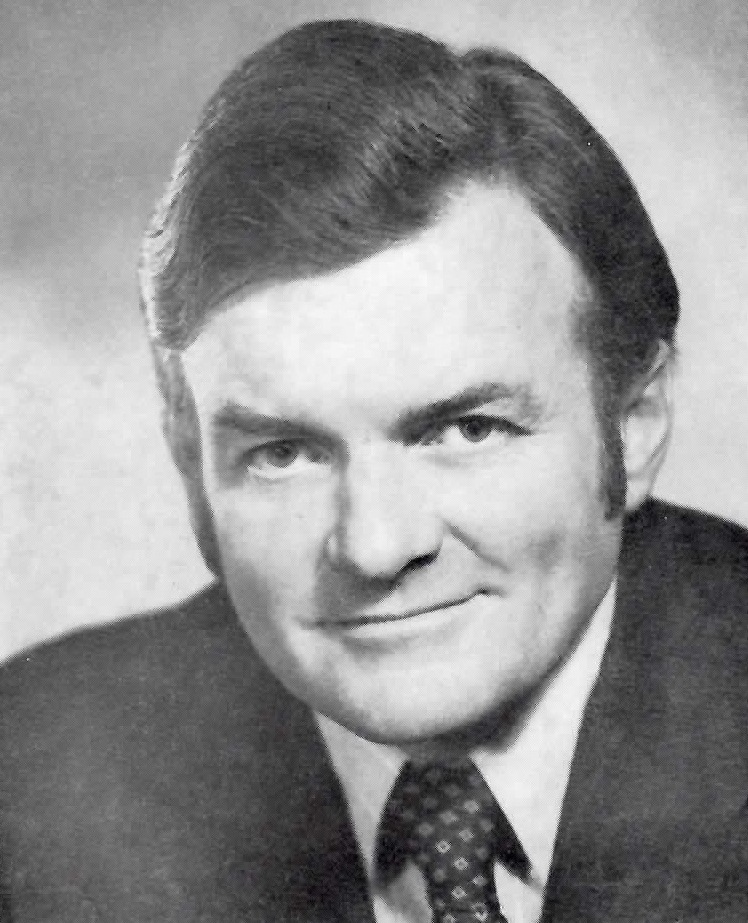

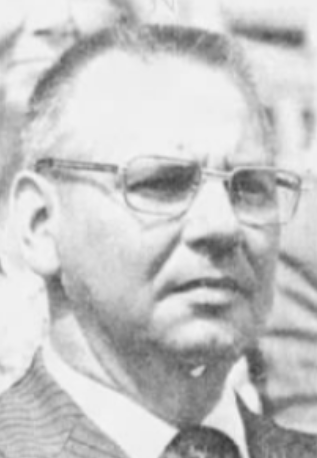

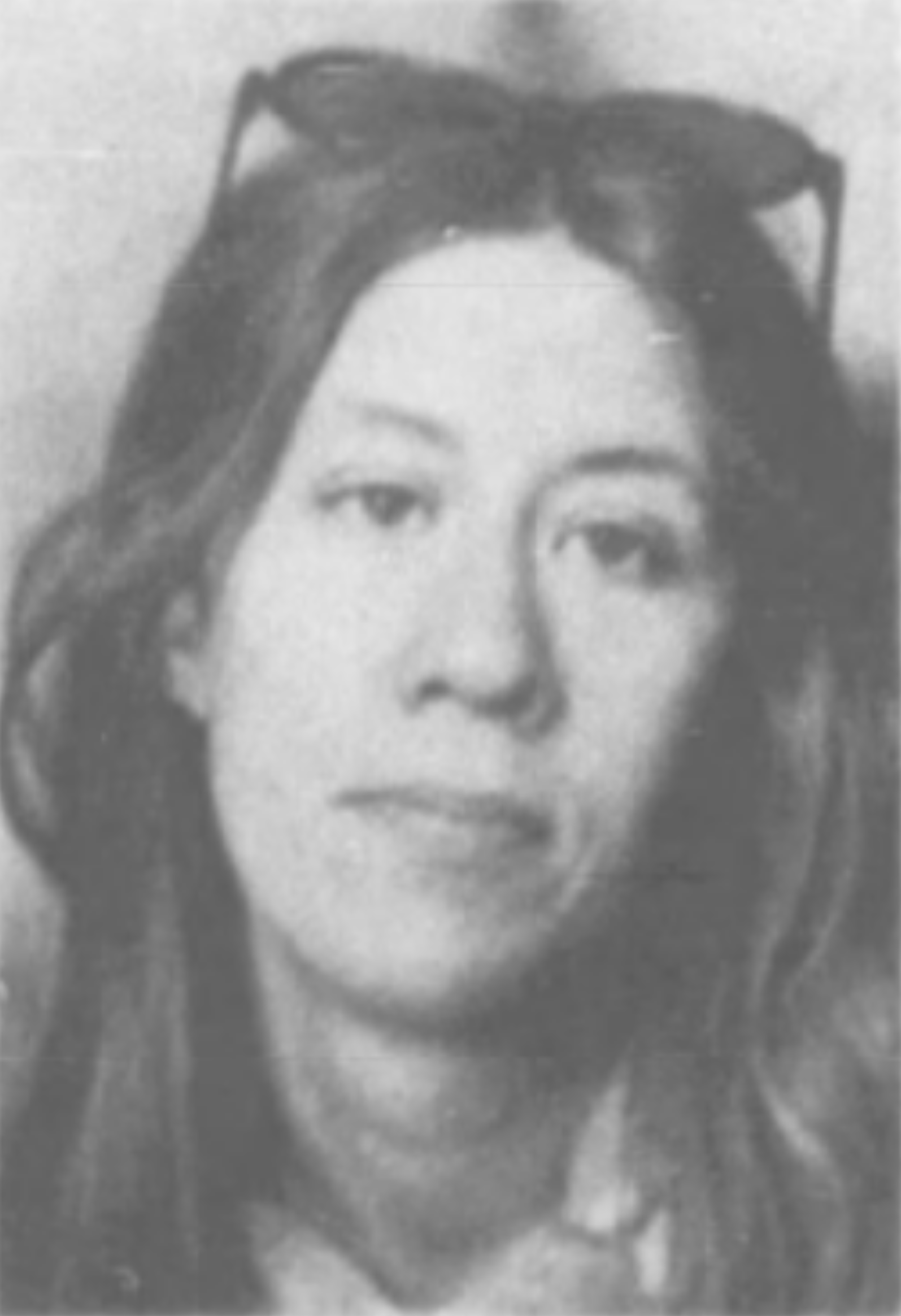
Nominee	Thomas P. Salmon	Walter L. Kennedy	Martha Abbott
Party	Democratic	Republican	Liberty Union
Popular vote	79,842	53,672	7,629
Percentage	56.56%	38.02%	5.41%
- Salmon: 40–50% 50–60% 60–70% 70–80% 80–90% Kennedy: 40–50% 50–60% 60–70% 70–80% >90%
Governor before election
Thomas P. Salmon
Democratic
Elected Governor
Thomas P. Salmon
Democratic

The 1974 Vermont gubernatorial election took place on November 5, 1974. Incumbent Democrat Thomas P. Salmon ran successfully for a second term as governor of Vermont, defeating Republican candidate Walter L. Kennedy and Liberty Union candidate Martha Abbott.

== Democratic primary ==
=== Results ===
Democratic primary results
Party	Candidate	Votes	%	±%
Democratic	Thomas P. Salmon (inc.)	18,498	83.6	
Democratic	John F. Reilly	3,537	16.0	
Democratic	Other	86	0.4	
Total votes		22,121	100.0	

== Republican primary ==
=== Results ===
Republican primary results
Party	Candidate	Votes	%	±%
Republican	Walter L. Kennedy	23,738	55.5	
Republican	Harry R. Montague	13,901	32.5	
Republican	T. James Lannon	4,667	10.9	
Republican	Other	478	1.1	
Total votes		42,784	100.0	

== General election ==
=== Results ===
1974 Vermont gubernatorial election
Party	Candidate	Votes	%	±%
Democratic	Thomas P. Salmon	77,254	54.73	
Independent Vermonters	Thomas P. Salmon	2,428	1.72	
N/A	Thomas P. Salmon	155	0.11	
Liberty Union	Thomas P. Salmon	5	0.00	
Total	Thomas P. Salmon (inc.)	79,842	56.56	
Republican	Walter L. Kennedy	53,672	38.02	
Liberty Union	Martha Abbott	7,629	5.41	
N/A	Other	13	0.01	
Total votes		141,156	100.0	
