= 1976 United States Senate election in Vermont =

- November 2, 1976
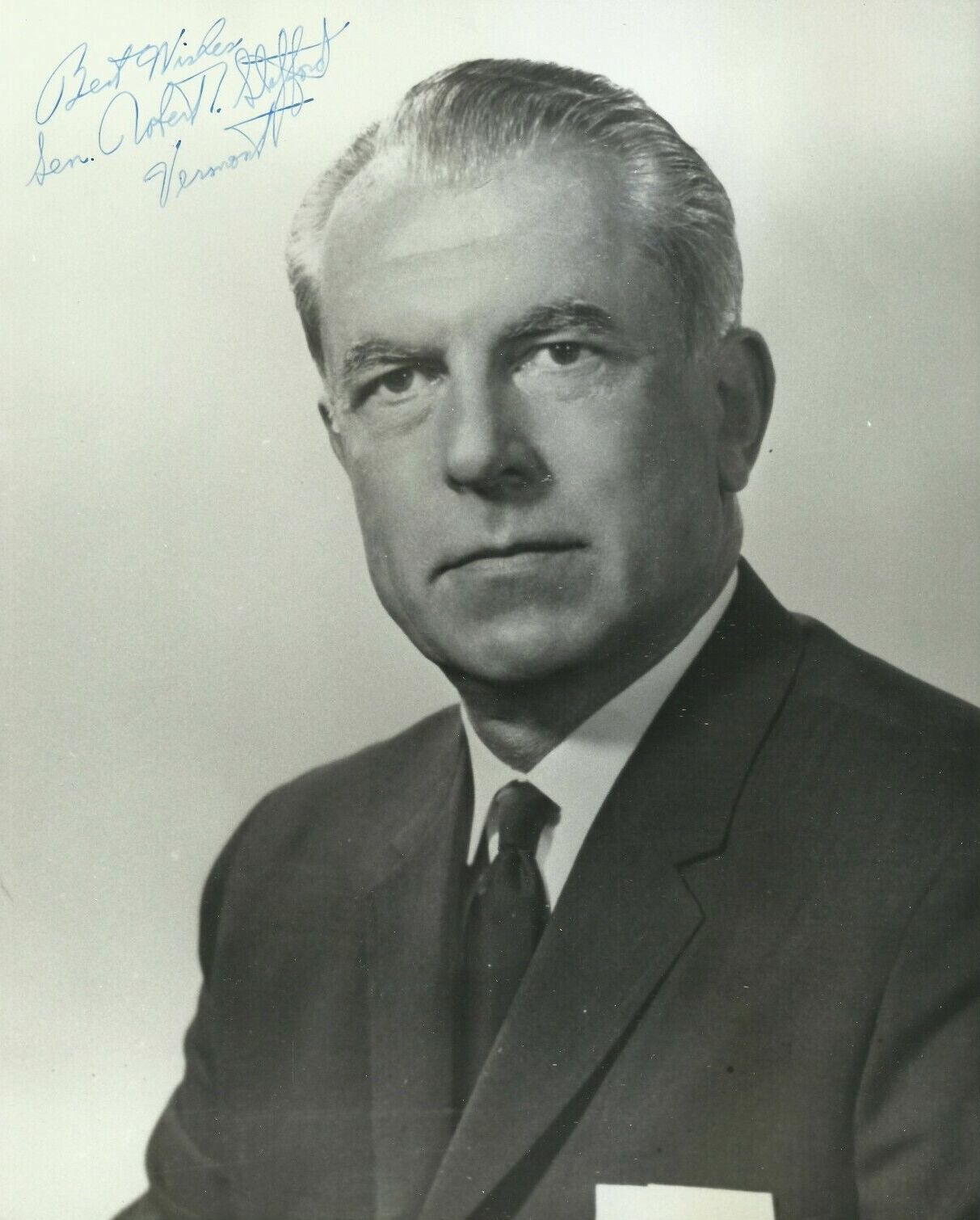

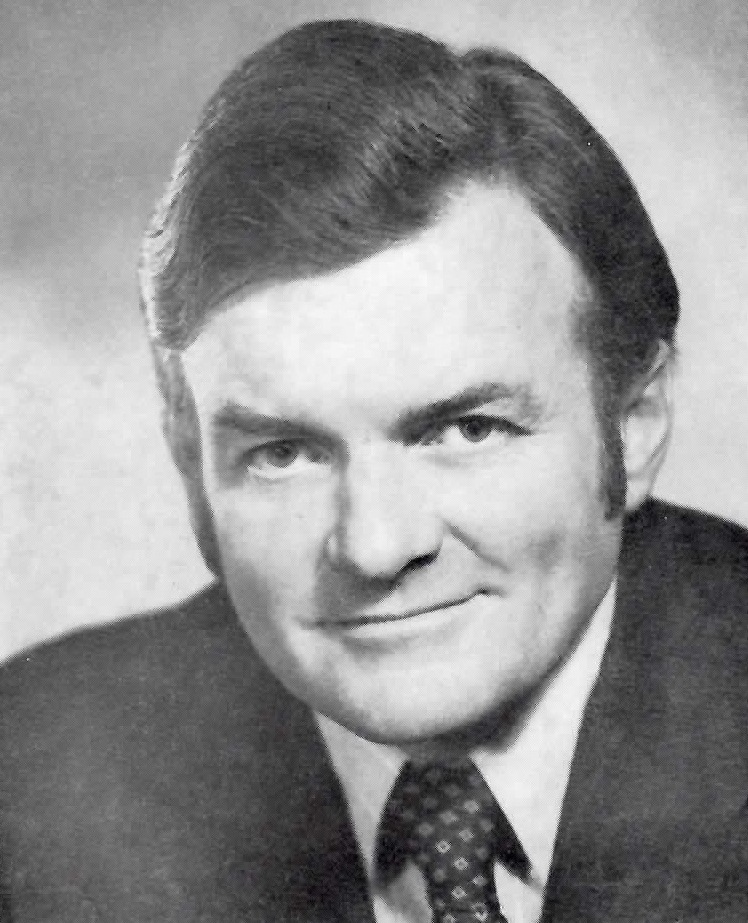
Nominee	Robert Stafford	Thomas P. Salmon
Party	Republican	Democratic
Popular vote	94,481	85,682
Percentage	49.97%	45.32%
- Stafford: 40–50% 50–60% 60–70% 70–80% Salmon: 40–50% 50–60% 60–70%
U.S. senator before election
Robert Stafford
Republican
Elected U.S. Senator
Robert Stafford
Republican

The 1976 United States Senate election in Vermont took place on November 2, 1976. Incumbent Republican Robert Stafford successfully ran for re-election to another term in the United States Senate, defeating Democratic candidate Governor Thomas P. Salmon.

== Republican primary ==
=== Results ===
Republican primary results
Party	Candidate	Votes	%	±%
Republican	Robert Stafford (incumbent)	24,338	68.7	
Republican	John J. Welch	10,911	30.8	
Republican	Other	178	0.5	
Total votes		35,427	100.0	

== Democratic primary ==
=== Results ===
Democratic primary results
Party	Candidate	Votes	%
Democratic	Thomas P. Salmon	21,674	52.7
Democratic	Scott Skinner	19,238	46.8
Democratic	Other	178	0.4
Total votes		41,090	100.0

== General election ==
=== Results ===
United States Senate election in Vermont, 1976
Party	Candidate	Votes	%
Republican	Robert Stafford (incumbent)	94,481	49.97%
Democratic	Thomas P. Salmon	82,174	43.46%
Independent Vermonters	Thomas P. Salmon	3,508	1.86%
Total	Thomas P. Salmon	85,682	45.32%
Liberty Union	Nancy Kaufman	8,801	4.66%
N/A	Other	96	0.05%
Total votes		189,060	100.00%
Republican hold			

== See also ==
- 1976 United States Senate elections
