= John J. Burns (Vermont politician) =

American politician (1894–1984)

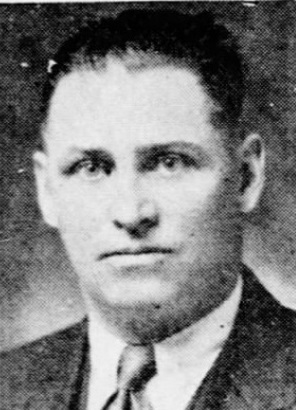
- The Burlington Free Press, March 6, 1939

Postmaster of Burlington, Vermont
- In office 1948–1964
- Preceded by: Patrick Mahoney
- Succeeded by: Frank J. Varricchione

29th Mayor of Burlington, Vermont
- In office 1939–1948
- Preceded by: Louis F. Dow
- Succeeded by: John Edward Moran

Member of the Vermont House of Representatives from Burlington
- In office 1939–1941
- Preceded by: James Edmund Burke
- Succeeded by: Patrick J. Cosgrove

Personal details
- Born: May 23, 1894 Sligo, Ireland
- Died: March 1, 1984 (aged 89) Burlington, Vermont, U.S.
- Resting place: Resurrection Park Cemetery, South Burlington, Vermont
- Party: Democratic
- Spouse: Isabelle Anna McAuliffe (m. 1926-1972, her death)
- Relations: Brian D. Burns (nephew)
- Children: 1
- Education: Norwich University (attended)
- Occupation: Insurance sales College baseball coach

Military service
- Allegiance: United States
- Branch/service: United States Army
- Years of service: 1917–1920
- Rank: First Lieutenant
- Unit: United States Army Air Service
- Battles/wars: World War I

John J. Burns (May 23, 1894 – March 1, 1984) was an American politician who resided in Burlington, Vermont. A Democrat, he was most notable for his service as Burlington's mayor from 1939 to 1948.

== Early life ==
John James Burns was born in Sligo, Ireland, on May 23, 1894, a son of John Burns and Mary (Dolan) Burns. His family moved to the United States when Burns was two years old, and settled in Burlington, Vermont when he was seven. Burns was educated in the schools of Burlington and attended Lawrence Academy in Massachusetts and Goddard Seminary in Barre City, Vermont. Burns was a student at Norwich University in 1916 and 1917. In the summer of 1917, he played semi-professional baseball in Montreal, where he was noticed by scouts for the Boston Braves of Major League Baseball. Invited to tryout for the Braves, Burns declined in order to join the military.

== Military service ==
Burns left college to join the United States Army for World War I. After enlisting in August 1917, he attended officers' training at Plattsburgh Barracks, New York. He then attended aviation ground training at Cornell University, followed by flight training at Kelly Field and Barron Field in Texas.

After completing flight school, Burns was commissioned as a second lieutenant, and was assigned as a flight instructor at bases in Oklahoma and Texas, including Henry Post Army Airfield. In addition to training new pilots, Burns was captain of the "First Flying Baseball Team", an Army program that attracted recruits by flying into communities throughout the Southwestern United States for games against local teams.

Burns was discharged at Love Field in Dallas, Texas, on September 7, 1920. A first lieutenant when he left active duty, Burns remained in the Army for several years as a member of the Organized Reserve Corps.

== Post-World War I ==
After the war, Burns was invited to try out for the St. Louis Cardinals, but a severe illness prevented him from following through. Deciding to remain in Oklahoma, he became the owner of a minor league baseball team in Duncan. According to members of his family, Burns's stadium in Duncan was desegregated. When his stadium was destroyed in a fire, they believed it to be arson resulting from his stance on race relations.

Burns subsequently returned to Burlington, where he began a career as an insurance salesman. In addition, he coached the baseball team at Saint Michael's College in Colchester for four years, then accepted the same position at Norwich University.

== Political career ==
Burns was active in Burlington government and politics. A Democrat, he served on Burlington's police commission and was a member of the commission that planned and oversaw construction of the Burlington International Airport. As an experienced aviator, Burns was credited with successfully persuading reluctant commissioners that an airport should be built, and with identifying the site the commission approved. Burns also served terms as a member of the city's board of aldermen. From 1939 to 1941, he represented Burlington in the Vermont House of Representatives.

In 1939, Burns was elected mayor of Burlington, succeeding Republican Louis F. Dow. He served until resigning in 1948, and was succeeded by John Edward Moran. As mayor, Burns was part of a contingent of mayors who visited Europe on a post-World War II goodwill tour. Burns garnered headlines in France when he extolled the virtues of Vermont by handing out maple sugar cakes as gifts.

== Later life ==
In 1948, Burns resigned as mayor to accept appointment as Burlington's postmaster. He served at the post office until retiring in 1964. He was a member of St. Anthony Catholic Church in Burlington and was a lifetime member of the Elks club.

Burns died in Burlington on March 1, 1984. He was buried at Resurrection Park Cemetery in South Burlington.

== Family ==
In 1926, Burns married Isabelle Anna McAuliffe (1902–1972) of Burlington. They were the parents of a son, John James Burns Jr. Burns's nephew, Brian D. Burns was also involved in politics and served as lieutenant governor from 1975 to 1977.
