= Dart Everett =

American politician (born 1940/41)

Dart Everett'

Member of the Vermont House of Representatives from the Windham 4–3 district
- In office 1982–1982
- Preceded by: Christian Hansen Jr.

Personal details
- Born: 1940 or 1941 (age 85–86)
- Party: Republican

Dart Everett (born 1940/1941) is an American politician. A member of the Republican Party, he served in the Vermont House of Representatives in 1982.
