= 1974 United States Senate election in Vermont =

- November 5, 1974
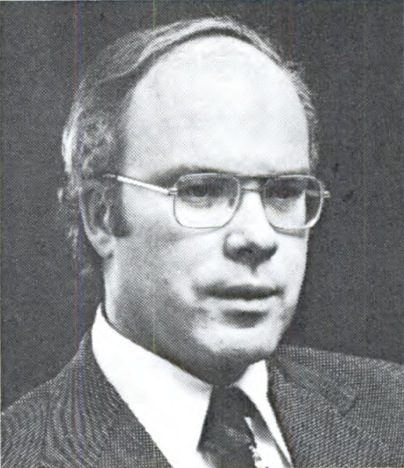

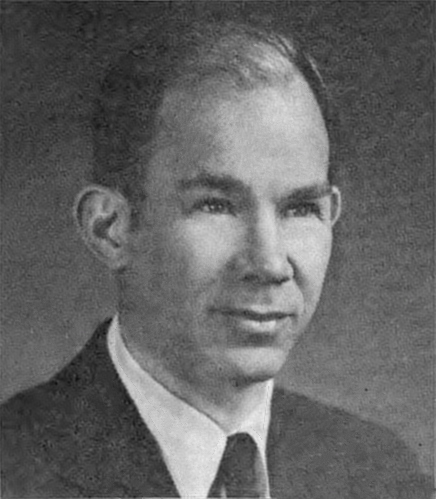
Nominee	Patrick Leahy	Richard Mallary
Party	Democratic	Republican
Popular vote	70,629	66,223
Percentage	49.47%	46.38%
- Leahy: 40–50% 50–60% 60–70% 70–80% Mallary: 40–50% 50–60% 60–70% 70–80% 80–90%
U.S. senator before election
George Aiken
Republican
Elected U.S. Senator
Patrick Leahy
Democratic

The 1974 United States Senate election in Vermont took place on November 5, 1974. The incumbent Republican Senator, George Aiken, did not run for re-election to another term in the United States Senate. The Democratic nominee, Patrick Leahy, the state's attorney of Chittenden County, defeated Republican nominee Rep. Richard W. Mallary to become Aiken's successor. This election also included Liberty Union Party candidate Bernie Sanders, who won 4.1% of the vote.

This election marked the first time in Vermont's history that it elected a Democrat to the U.S. Senate. Leahy remained the only Democrat ever elected to the Senate from Vermont until 2022, when he retired and was succeeded by Peter Welch. The last non-Republican elected to the Senate from Vermont before 1974 was Lawrence Brainerd, a Free Soil Party member chosen in 1854 by an anti-slavery coalition of the Vermont General Assembly to fill a brief vacancy in this same seat.

Leahy and Sanders would later serve together in the Senate from Sanders's election in 2006 until Leahy's retirement in 2023.

== Republican primary ==
=== Candidates ===
- T. Serse Ambrosini, former vice president of the Chase Manhattan Bank
- Richard W. Mallary, U.S. representative from Vermont's at-large congressional district
- Charles R. Ross, former member of the Burlington City Council and professor of economics at the University of Vermont

=== Results ===
Republican primary results
Party	Candidate	Votes	%
Republican	Richard W. Mallary	27,221	59.1%
Republican	Charles R. Ross	14,479	35.8%
Republican	T. Serse Ambrosini	2,265	4.9%
None	Scattering	61	0.1%
Total votes		44,026	100.00%

== Democratic primary ==
=== Candidates ===
- Nathaniel Frothingham, former teacher
- Patrick Leahy, state attorney for Chittenden County

=== Results ===
Democratic primary results
Party	Candidate	Votes	%
Democratic	Patrick Leahy	19,801	83.9%
Democratic	Nathaniel Frothingham	3,703	15.7%
None	Scattering	97	0.4%
Total votes		23,601	100.00%

== General election ==
=== Candidates ===
- Patrick Leahy (D), state's attorney for Chittenden County
- Richard W. Mallary (R), U.S. representative from Vermont's at-large congressional district
- Bernie Sanders (LU), carpenter and social worker

=== Results ===
1974 United States Senate election in Vermont
Party	Candidate	Votes	%
Democratic	Patrick Leahy	70,629	49.47%
Republican	Richard W. Mallary	66,223	46.38%
Liberty Union	Bernie Sanders	5,901	4.13%
Write-in		19	0.01%
Total votes		142,772	100.00%
Democratic gain from Republican			

== See also ==
- 1974 United States Senate elections
