= Vermont Department of Liquor Control =

American state government agency

Formed in 1933, the Vermont Department of Liquor and Lottery is a department of the state government of Vermont responsible for purchasing, distributing, and selling distilled spirits through its agency stores and enforcing Vermont's alcohol and tobacco statutes, with a strong emphasis on limiting youth access.

== Line of duty deaths ==
Since 1933, the Vermont Department of Liquor Control has lost 1 officer.
