= Stella Hackel Sims =

American lawyer

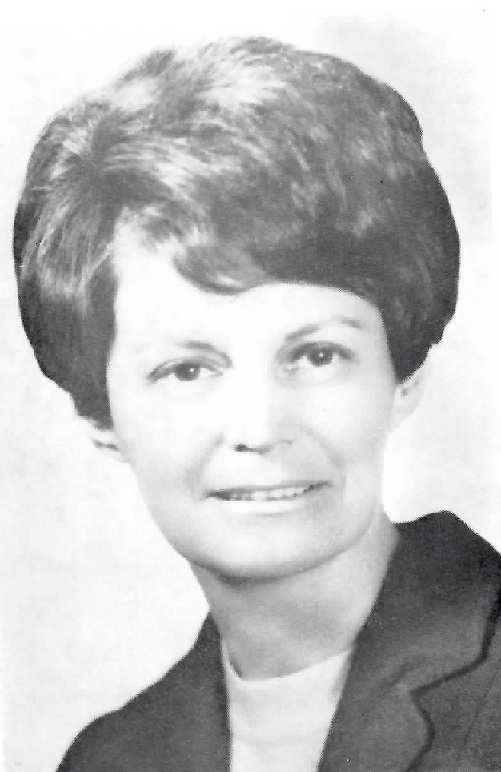

32nd Director of the United States Mint
- In office November 1, 1977 – April 1, 1981
- President: Jimmy Carter; Ronald Reagan
- Preceded by: Mary Brooks
- Succeeded by: Donna Pope

Treasurer of Vermont
- In office January 3, 1975 – January 6, 1977
- Governor: Thomas Salmon
- Preceded by: Frank Davis
- Succeeded by: Emory Hebard

Personal details
- Born: Stella Bloomberg; December 27, 1926 (age 99) Burlington, Vermont, U.S.
- Party: Democratic
- Education: University of Vermont (BA); Boston University (JD)

Stella Bloomberg Hackel Sims (born December 27, 1926) is an American attorney and politician who served as the 32nd director of the United States Mint from 1977 to 1981.

== Early life and education ==
Sims was born Stella Bloomberg was born in 1926 in Burlington, Vermont. She was educated at the University of Vermont, graduating in 1945, and at the Boston University School of Law, receiving her Juris Doctor in 1948.

== Career ==
In 1957, she was elected grand juror (city court prosecutor) of Rutland, Vermont, holding that office until 1963. From 1963 to 1973, she was Commissioner of the Vermont Department of Employment Security. In 1971 and 1972, she was also president of the Interstate Conference of Employment Security Agencies.

Sims was the successful Democratic Party nominee for Vermont state treasurer in 1974 and served one term, 1975 to 1977. She was the Democratic nominee in the 1976 Vermont gubernatorial election, losing the general election to Richard A. Snelling. She was succeeded as treasurer by Emory A. Hebard and returned to Rutland as city attorney.

In 1977, President Jimmy Carter nominated Sims as director of the United States Mint, and she held the office from November 1977 to April 1981. In that capacity, she oversaw the creation of the Susan B. Anthony dollar in 1979. She attracted controversy from historians and numismatists alike when she ordered the destruction of Mint records in 1978.

== Personal life ==
In 1949, she married Donald H. Hackel (1925–1985). After her first husband died she married Dr. Arthur I. Sims and became known as Stella Hackel Sims. Arthur Sims died in 2006. Sims retired in 1988, settling in Arlington, Virginia and Naples, Florida.

Political offices
Preceded by Frank Davis	Treasurer of Vermont; 1975–1977	Succeeded by Emory Hebard
Party political offices
Vacant Title last held by George J. Kingston, Jr.	Democratic nominee for Vermont State Treasurer; 1974	Succeeded by Stuart St. Peter
Preceded by Thomas Salmon	Democratic nominee for Governor of Vermont; 1976	Succeeded by Edwin Granai
Government offices
Preceded by Mary Brooks	Director of the United States Mint; 1977–1981	Succeeded by Donna Pope
