= Timothy J. O'Connor =

American politician

Timothy J. O'Connor Jr. (December 13, 1936 – January 16, 2018) was a Vermont lawyer and politician who served as Speaker of the Vermont House of Representatives.

== Biography ==
Timothy J. "Tim" O'Connor Jr. was born in Brattleboro, Vermont, on December 13, 1936. He graduated from College of the Holy Cross in Worcester, Massachusetts and received his law degree from Georgetown University Law Center, afterwards beginning a practice in Brattleboro. From 1965 to 1967 O'Connor served as Brattleboro's Municipal Court Judge.

A Democrat, in 1968 he was elected to the Vermont House of Representatives. He served from 1969 to 1981, and was Chairman of the House Judiciary Committee from 1973 to 1975. O'Connor was succeeded in the House by Christian Hansen Jr.

In 1975 O'Connor was elected Speaker of the House, serving until 1981. O'Connor's election as Speaker was noteworthy because he was the first Democrat to hold the post since the founding of the Republican Party in the 1850s. In addition, O'Connor's election made headlines because he was from the minority party in the House. Republicans held the majority throughout O'Connor's tenure as Speaker.

In 1980 O'Connor was an unsuccessful candidate for the Democratic nomination for governor, afterwards returning to his Brattleboro law practice.

O'Connor practiced law until his 2011 retirement, also continuing to serve in local offices including Town Meeting Moderator. O'Connor died at Dartmouth-Hitchcock Medical Center in Lebanon, New Hampshire on January 16, 2018.

Survivors include his wife; a son, Kevin O'Connor of Brattleboro; two daughters, Kate O'Connor of Brattleboro and Kerry (Robert) Amidon of Vernon; three grandchildren, Daniel, David and Jacob Amidon of Vernon; and a brother, W. Brian O'Connor of Amherst, Mass.

== Personal life ==
On July 8, 1961, O'Connor married Martha Elizabeth Hannum of Putney, Vermont. They were the parents of three children—Kevin, Kate, and Kerry. Kate O'Connor served as a top aide to Howard Dean during his governorship and 2004 presidential candidacy.

Political offices
Preceded by Walter L. Kennedy	Speaker of the Vermont House of Representatives; 1975 – 1981	Succeeded by Stephan A. Morse
