= Robert K. Bing =

American politician (1930–2023)

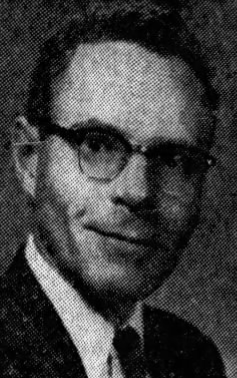
- Bing in 1961

33rd Mayor of Burlington
- In office June 5, 1961 – June 3, 1963
- Preceded by: James E. Fitzpatrick
- Succeeded by: Edward A. Keenan

Executive Director of the Commission on Crime Control and Prevention
- In office October 1, 1969 – December 28, 1970
- Preceded by: Jonathan Brownell
- Succeeded by: Philip F. McCarthy

Personal details
- Born: July 8, 1930 Colchester, Vermont, U.S.
- Died: October 21, 2023 (aged 93)
- Party: Republican
- Spouse(s): Geraldine Johnson; Jean Pike
- Parents: Chester K. Bing (father); Katherine Ryan Seaver (mother)
- Education: University of Vermont; Yale Law School
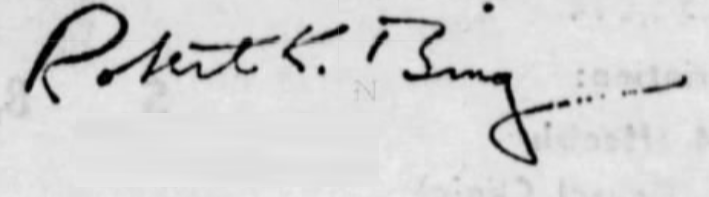
- Signature

Military service
- Allegiance: United States
- Branch/service: United States Navy; Vermont Wing Civil Air Patrol
- Years of service: 1948-1949

Robert Kendrew Bing (July 8, 1930 – October 21, 2023) was an American politician and lawyer who served as the 33rd Mayor of Burlington, Vermont.

== Life and career ==
On July 8, 1930, Robert Kendrew Bing was born to Katherine Ryan Seaver and Chester K. Bing in Colchester, Vermont. In 1948, Bing graduated from Montpelier High School and then served in the navy for one year. In 1952, he married Geraldine Johnson. In 1953, Bing graduated from the University of Vermont and in 1956 he graduated from Yale Law School. In October 1956, Bing was admitted to Vermont's bar and became District Court Judge Ernest W. Gibson Jr.'s law secretary. In 1958, he was the Republican nominee for Chittenden County state's attorney, but was defeated. In 1960, Bing was selected as one of thirty alternate delegates to the Vermont Republican state convention.

On February 13, 1961, the Republican city committee gave Bing the nomination for mayor and on March 7 he defeated incumbent Democratic Mayor James E. Fitzpatrick with 4,953 votes to 4,024 votes and was victorious in every ward except for Ward 4–1, despite having never held an elected office or been involved in city politics prior to the mayoral race. During Bing's tenure, he supported the city government using a strong-mayor system rather than a weak-mayor system. He later announced that he would not seek reelection and endorsed Alderman Edward A. Keenan.

In 1965, Bing was appointed as wing commander for the Vermont Wing Civil Air Patrol. In 1969, he was elected as president of the Vermont Bar Association and Governor Deane C. Davis appointed him as executive director of the Commission on Crime Control and Prevention and served until his resignation in 1971. In 1971, Bing was the campaign manager of Frank Dion's unsuccessful mayoral campaign, Dion had been his campaign manager in 1961, against Gordon Paquette. In 1993, he congratulated Peter C. Brownell for his upset victory against Peter Clavelle in the mayoral race.

Bing died on October 21, 2023, at the age of 93.
