= Richard W. Mallary =

American politician (1929–2011)

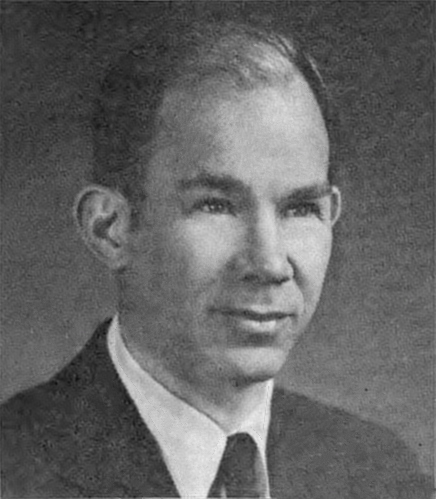

Member of the U.S. House of Representatives from Vermont's at-large district
- In office January 7, 1972 – January 3, 1975
- Preceded by: Robert Stafford
- Succeeded by: Jim Jeffords

Vermont Secretary of Administration
- In office 1971–1971
- Governor: Deane C. Davis
- Preceded by: William J. French
- Succeeded by: William J. French
- In office 1977–1980
- Governor: Richard A. Snelling
- Preceded by: Ralph C. Peters
- Succeeded by: William A. Gilbert

Member of the Vermont Senate
- In office 1969–1971
- Preceded by: Walter H. Wheatley
- Succeeded by: Robert Simpson
- Constituency: Orange County

Speaker of the Vermont House of Representatives
- In office 1965–1969
- Preceded by: Franklin S. Billings Jr.
- Succeeded by: John S. Burgess

Member of the Vermont House of Representatives
- In office 1961–1969
- Preceded by: Reginald G. Munn
- Succeeded by: Morris D. Perry
- Constituency: Fairlee
- In office 1999–2001 Serving with Philip A. Angell Jr.
- Preceded by: Ralph D. Baker
- Succeeded by: Stephen W. Webster
- Constituency: Randolph

Personal details
- Born: Richard Walker Mallary; February 21, 1929 Springfield, Massachusetts, U.S.
- Died: September 27, 2011 (aged 82) Brookfield, Vermont, U.S.
- Party: Republican
- Spouse(s): Mary Harper Coxe (m. 1955); Jeannie (Loud) Brownell (m. 1979)
- Children: 4
- Education: Dartmouth College
- Profession: Farmer; Business executive

Richard Walker Mallary (February 21, 1929 – September 27, 2011) was an American businessman and politician. He served for three years as a U.S. representative from Vermont and was the Republican nominee for the United States Senate in 1974, losing narrowly to Patrick Leahy. He died by suicide on September 27, 2011 after being diagnosed with terminal prostate cancer.

== Biography ==
Mallary was born in Springfield, Massachusetts on February 21, 1929, and was the son of attorney R. DeWitt Mallary and Gertrude (Robinson) Mallary. He was educated at Bradford Academy in Bradford, Vermont, and received an A.B. degree from Dartmouth College in 1949.

Mallary operated a dairy farm in Fairlee, Vermont from 1950 to 1970, where he was subsequently elected chairman of the town Board of Selectmen, serving from 1951 to 1953. His mother served terms in both the Vermont House of Representatives and Vermont Senate, and he followed her into state politics by running successfully for the state House in 1960. He served from 1961 to 1969, advanced to chairman of the appropriations committee and held the position of Speaker from 1965 to 1969. In the House Mallary was recognized as one of the "Young Turks," the group of legislators who crossed party lines to advocate for progressive policies and the modernizing of Vermont's state government.

He was Trustee and Treasurer of Vermont State Colleges from 1962 to 1965. Mallary served as Chairman of the Vermont Legislative Council from 1965 to 1967, and as a delegate to the 1968 Republican National Convention which nominated Richard M. Nixon for President. He served as vice chairman of the Vermont Governor's Committee on Administrative Coordination in 1969.

He was a member of the Vermont Senate from 1969 to 1971. Mallary served as Vermont Secretary of Administration in 1971, in the cabinet of Governor Deane C. Davis.

Mallary was elected as a Republican to the Ninety-second Congress, filling the vacancy caused when Robert T. Stafford resigned to accept appointment to the United States Senate. Mallary was re-elected to a full term in the Ninety-third Congress, and thus served from January 7, 1972 to January 3, 1975. He was, as the Republican nominee, an unsuccessful candidate for election to the United States Senate in 1974, narrowly losing to Patrick Leahy by a margin of 49.5%–46.4%.

Mallary was Vice President of the Farm Credit Bank in Springfield, Massachusetts from 1975 to 1977. He was Vermont's Secretary of Administration again from 1977 to 1980, in the first administration of Governor Richard A. Snelling. He served as vice president of the Central Vermont Public Service Corp. from 1980 to 1983, chairman of the board of a heating company from 1984 to 1985, and president of the Vermont Electric Power Company from 1986 to 1994.

He later resided in Brookfield, Vermont. From 1999 to 2001 Mallary served again in the Vermont House of Representatives. He voted for Vermont's Civil Unions law in 2000 even though he represented a conservative district which opposed the legislation. That fall he ran for reelection unsuccessfully as an independent. He ran again unsuccessfully in 2002.

In 2003, Mallary served as Vermont's tax commissioner, an appointed sub-cabinet position, in the administration of Republican Governor Jim Douglas.

In retirement Mallary continued to serve in local office including chairman of the town planning commission and town meeting moderator. He was also an advocate of "death with dignity" legislation. In his later years he was ill with incurable prostate cancer. He died in Brookfield on September 27, 2011. In 2012 members of his family made public the fact that Mallary had taken his life as a result of his illness.

== Family ==
Mallary's first wife was Mary Harper Coxe. They had four children—Richard, Anne, Elizabeth and Sarah. They divorced in 1974, and in 1979 he married Jeannie (Loud) Brownell, with whom he had three stepchildren—Jonathan, Lydia and Hayden.

His nephew Peter Mallary served in the Vermont House and as chairman of the Vermont Democratic Party.

== Electoral history ==
- 1972 special election for U.S. House (Vermont's at-large district) (January 7, 1972)
  - Richard W. Mallary (R), 55.8%
  - J. William O'Brien (D), 37.6%
  - Doris Lake (Liberty Union), 4.7%
  - Anthony N. Doria (Independent), 1.9%
- 1972 election for U.S. House (Vermont's at-large district)
  - Richard W. Mallary (R), 65.0%
  - William H. Meyer (D), 34.97%
  - Blank or scattered, .03%
- 1974 election for U.S. Senate (Vermont, Class 3)
  - Patrick Leahy (D), 49.5%
  - Richard W. Mallary (R), 46.4%

== Sources ==
- United States Congress. "Richard W. Mallary (id: M000078)". Biographical Directory of the United States Congress.
- Agency of Administration

Political offices
Preceded by Franklin S. Billings, Jr.	Speaker of the Vermont House of Representatives; 1965 – 1969	Succeeded by John S. Burgess
U.S. House of Representatives
Preceded by Robert Stafford	Member of the U.S. House of Representatives from Vermont's at-large congressional district January 7, 1972 – January 3, 1975	Succeeded by Jim Jeffords
Party political offices
Preceded by George Aiken	Republican nominee for U.S. Senator from Vermont (Class 3); 1974	Succeeded by Stewart M. Ledbetter
