= James E. Fitzpatrick =

American politician

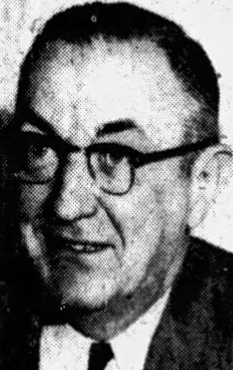
- Fitzpatrick in 1961

32nd Mayor of Burlington
- In office June 1, 1959 – June 5, 1961
- Preceded by: Claude Douglas Cairns
- Succeeded by: Robert K. Bing

President of the Burlington, Vermont Board of Aldermen
- In office June 2, 1958 – June 1, 1959

Member of the Burlington, Vermont Board of Aldermen
- In office 1946 – June 1, 1959
- Succeeded by: Henry M. Farmer

Personal details
- Born: July 9, 1908 Burlington, Vermont, U.S.
- Died: February 28, 1967 (aged 58) Burlington, Vermont, U.S.
- Party: Democratic
- Spouse: Harriet C. Chapman
- Children: 7
- Parents: Thomas W. Fitzpatrick (father); Mary E. Malloy (mother)

James E. Fitzpatrick (July 9, 1908 – February 28, 1967) was an American politician who served as the 32nd mayor of Burlington, Vermont.

== Life ==
James E. Fitzpatrick was born in Burlington, Vermont, on July 9, 1908, to Thomas W. Fitzpatrick and Mary E. Malloy.

On January 4, 1946, he was given the Democratic nomination for Ward Four's alderman seat and was elected without opposition. He served on the board for thirteen years, during which he was elected as president of the board of aldermen.

On February 3, 1959, he announced his candidacy for Burlington's mayoralty and was given the Democratic nomination on February 7. Incumbent Republican Mayor C. Douglas Cairns chose to not run for reelection, and Fitzpatrick defeated Paul C. Dorn by a margin of 994 votes, with 4,920 votes to Dorn's 3,926.

During Fitzpatrick's tenure as mayor, he and the board of aldermen signed a petition asking President Eisenhower to review the order that would close the Ethan Allen Air Force Base.

Fitzpatrick ran for re-election in 1961 against Robert K. Bing, who had not previously held an elected office or been involved in city politics prior to the mayoral race. He was unexpectedly defeated, with 4,024 votes to Bing's 4,953.

On September 11, 1961, Fitzpatrick was appointed to Burlington's airport commission against the will of mayor Bing. He served on the commission until his death. On June 24, 1964, he won the endorsement of the Chittenden County Democratic Committee to succeed John J. Burns as postmaster of Burlington, but never took the civil service examination; on August 25, 1965, he announced that he would not accept the congressional appointment to the position.

Fitzpatrick talked about the possibility of returning to the board of aldermen in 1967. However, on February 28, 1967, he suffered a heart attack and died.

Political offices
Preceded by Claude Douglas Cairns	Mayor of Burlington, Vermont; 1959–1961	Succeeded by Robert K. Bing
