= Earle B. McLaughlin =

U.S. Marshal for Vermont (1921–2003)

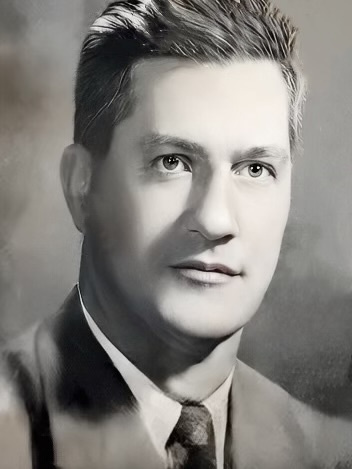
- Restored version of photo used in McLaughlin's campaign posters, circa 1958

United States Marshal for Vermont
- In office July 28, 1977 – March 17, 1982
- Nominated by: Jimmy Carter
- Preceded by: Christian Hansen Jr.
- Succeeded by: Christian Hansen Jr.

Sheriff of Chittenden County, Vermont
- In office February 1, 1955 – July 31, 1977
- Preceded by: Charles Barber
- Succeeded by: Ronald Duell

Personal details
- Born: March 15, 1921 Proctor, Vermont, U.S.
- Died: December 2, 2003 (aged 82) Burlington, Vermont, U.S.
- Resting place: Resurrection Park Cemetery, South Burlington, Vermont, U.S.
- Party: Democratic
- Spouse: Theresa Marie DesVergnes (m. 1948–2003, his death)
- Education: Saint Michael's College (attended)
- Profession: Law enforcement officer
- Nickname: Buzz

Military service
- Service: United States Army Air Forces
- Years of service: 1942 –1945
- Rank: Sergeant
- Unit: 3rd Bomber Group, Fifth Air Force
- Battles/wars: World War II: South West Pacific theatre; Defense of Australia; New Guinea campaign; Second Philippines campaign
- Awards: Asiatic–Pacific Campaign Medal with seven battle stars Philippine Liberation Medal; Good Conduct Medal

Earle B. McLaughlin (March 15, 1921 – December 2, 2003) was a career law enforcement officer from Vermont. A veteran of World War II, he was most notable for his service as Sheriff of Chittenden County, Vermont, from 1955 to 1977 and United States Marshal for Vermont from 1977 to 1982.

== Early life ==
Earle Bernard "Buzz" McLaughlin was born in Proctor, Vermont, on March 15, 1921, the son of Earle B. McLaughlin (1890–1955) and Julia Isabel (McGarry) McLaughlin (1891–1962). He attended the schools of Proctor and was a 1939 graduate of Proctor High School. After finishing high school, McLaughlin was employed by the Works Progress Administration as the leader of recreation activities for the WPA program in Winooski.

== Military service ==
In January 1942, McLaughlin volunteered for World War II by enlisting in the United States Army Air Forces. He completed his initial training at Sheppard Field near Wichita Falls, Texas, then served in the South West Pacific theatre. Initially assigned to United States Army Air Forces in Australia, he subsequently served in the 3rd Bomber Group during the New Guinea campaign and second Philippines campaign.

In June 1945, he returned to the United States and was assigned to the Army Air Forces Redistribution Center in Atlantic City, New Jersey. He served briefly at Mitchel Field, New York before transferring to the separation center at Fort Devens Army Air Field, Massachusetts. He was discharged in September 1945 with the rank of sergeant, and his awards included the Asiatic–Pacific Campaign Medal with seven battle stars, Philippine Liberation Medal, and Good Conduct Medal.

== Career ==
=== Early career ===
After his military service, McLaughlin resided in Burlington and attended Saint Michael's College in Colchester. He worked as a sales representative for Blodgett Supply Company, a seller of plumbing and heating supplies, and was later employed in the purchasing department of the local General Electric plant.

=== Chittenden County Sheriff ===
McLaughlin became active in politics as a Democrat, and served as treasurer of the Burlington chapter of Young Democrats of Vermont. In August 1954, he announced his candidacy for sheriff of Chittenden County. In November, he won the general election, defeating incumbent Republican Charles Barber.

After beginning his term in 1955, McLaughlin won reelection in 1956, 1958, 1960, 1962, 1964, 1966, 1968, 1972, and 1974. (Note: In 1974, terms were changed from two years to four.) In 1957, he graduated from the FBI National Academy. While serving as sheriff, McLaughlin was active in the National Parole and Probation Association and served a term as president of the Vermont Sheriffs Association. In 1976, he was elected president of the New England chapter of FBI National Academy Associates. His efforts while in office included organizing deputies to patrol the county's rural areas and requiring deputies to wear a standard uniform.

=== United States Marshal ===
In 1977, McLaughlin was appointed United States Marshal for Vermont, succeeding Christian Hansen Jr. During McLaughlin's term, the marshal's office was expanded due to increased workload, including the addition of more deputies and a court security inspector.

In 1979, Vermont's United States District Court was the site of the trial of Kristina Berster, a resident of West Germany who was accused of being a member of the Red Army Faction terrorist group. Berster was convicted of three felonies and two misdemeanors, and McLaughlin received the U.S. Marshal's Service Meritorious Service Award to recognize his efforts to coordinate the extensive physical security operation executed during her four-week trial. McLaughlin served until March 1982, and was succeeded by Hansen.

== Retirement and death ==
In retirement, McLaughlin resided in Burlington and in Florida. He died in Burlington on December 2, 2003. McLaughlin was buried at Resurrection Park Cemetery in South Burlington.

== Family ==
In 1948, McLaughlin married Theresa Marie DesVergnes (1924–2013). They were married until his death and were the parents of 11 children.

McLaughlin's son Kevin spent his career with the Chittenden County Sheriff's Department and served as sheriff from 1987 to 2023.
