= Thomas P. Salmon =

American politician (1932–2025)

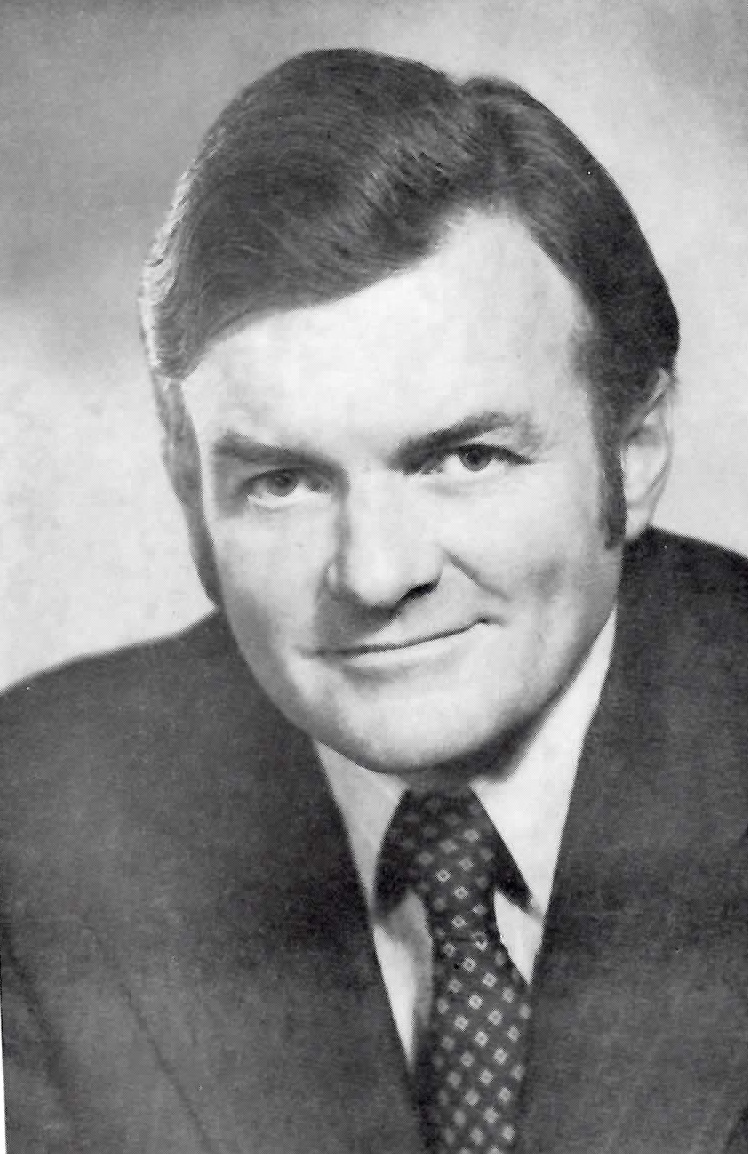
- Salmon in 1975

75th Governor of Vermont
- In office January 4, 1973 – January 6, 1977
- Lieutenant: John S. Burgess; Brian D. Burns
- Preceded by: Deane C. Davis
- Succeeded by: Richard A. Snelling

Minority Leader of the Vermont House of Representatives
- In office January 8, 1969 – January 5, 1971
- Preceded by: Leo O'Brien
- Succeeded by: Thomas Candon

Member of the Vermont House of Representatives
- In office January 6, 1965 – January 5, 1971
- Preceded by: Clarence Coleman (Rockingham)
- Succeeded by: Maurice Stack; Randolph Major (13-1 district)

Personal details
- Born: Thomas Paul Salmon; August 19, 1932 Cleveland, Ohio, U.S.
- Died: January 14, 2025 (aged 92) Brattleboro, Vermont, U.S.
- Party: Democratic
- Spouse(s): Madge Savaria (m. 1958; div. 1983) Susan Bisson (m. 1984)
- Children: 4 (including Tom)
- Education: Boston College (BA, JD); New York University (LLM)

Thomas Paul Salmon (August 19, 1932 – January 14, 2025) was an American Democratic Party politician who served as the 75th governor of Vermont from 1973 to 1977.

== Early life ==
Thomas P. Salmon was born in Cleveland, Ohio, on August 19, 1932, the son of Thomas A. Salmon and Lucy M. (Conlon) Salmon. He was raised in Stow, Massachusetts, attended Stow High School, and graduated in 1950 from Hudson High School in Hudson, Massachusetts. He earned his undergraduate degree in history and government from Boston College in 1954, and earned a J.D. from Boston College Law School in 1957. He earned an LL.M. degree in taxation from New York University Law School in 1958. After admission to the bar, he settled in Rockingham, Vermont, where he practiced law as a partner in the firm of Salmon and Nostrand.

Salmon was active in the Catholic church and belonged to the Knights of Columbus. His other memberships included the American Bar Association, Vermont Bar Association, and Windham County Bar Association. His fraternal memberships included the Elks and Moose. Among Salmon's civic affiliations were Historic Windsor, Inc., Bellows Falls Area Development Corporation, Green Mountain Council of Boy Scouts of America, Northeast Economic Action Council, and Rotary Club. He was a member of the Rockingham, Vermont and served as chairman of the Windham County Democratic Committee.

=== Family ===
In August 1958, Salmon married Madeleine Gabrielle Savaria. They were the parents of four children: Anne Marie, Marguerite, Thomas M., and Caroline. Thomas M. Salmon served as Vermont State Auditor from 2007 to 2013. Thomas and Madeleine Salmon divorced in 1983, and in 1984 he married Susan June Bisson.

== Career ==
In 1960, Salmon became town counsel for Rockingham, Vermont, and he served until 1972. From 1963 to 1965, he served as judge of the Bellows Falls municipal court. He was a member of the Vermont House of Representatives from Rockingham in 1965, and from District 13-1 for 1966, from 1967 to 1968 and from 1969 to 1971. During his last term, he was House Minority Leader. In 1970, he was the unsuccessful Democratic nominee for Vermont Attorney General.

=== Governorship ===
In 1972, Salmon won an upset victory in the election for governor; he entered the race only a month before the September primary and only three months before the general election. During the campaign, Salmon capitalized on the widespread perception that out-of-state investors were overdeveloping the state's land with the slogan "Vermont Is Not For Sale." Republicans won every other statewide office, but Salmon convincingly won the governorship. In office, he shepherded passage of a land gains tax that was credited with slowing land speculation in Vermont. He won reelection in 1974, chaired the New England Governors' Conference for two years, and was a member of the National Governors Association's Executive Committee. Salmon was an unsuccessful candidate for U.S. Senator from Vermont in the 1976 election, losing to the incumbent Robert Stafford.

=== Later career ===
After leaving office, Salmon resumed practicing law. In 1991, Salmon was appointed interim president of the University of Vermont and served as the university's permanent president from 1993 to 1998. Upon retiring from UVM, he practiced law in Bellows Falls, Vermont. He also served as chairman of the board for Green Mountain Power from 1983 to 2002.

Salmon died in Brattleboro, Vermont, on January 14, 2025.

Vermont House of Representatives
Preceded by Leo O'Brien	Minority Leader of the Vermont House of Representatives; 1969–1971	Succeeded by Thomas Candon
Party political offices
Preceded by Thomas Whalen	Democratic nominee for Attorney General of Vermont; 1970	Succeeded by Richard Gadbois
Preceded by Leo O'Brien	Democratic nominee for Governor of Vermont; 1972, 1974	Succeeded by Stella Hackel Sims
Preceded by Randolph Major	Democratic nominee for U.S. Senator from Vermont (Class 1); 1976	Succeeded by James A. Guest
Political offices
Preceded by Deane C. Davis	Governor of Vermont; 1973–1977	Succeeded by Richard A. Snelling
