= Mayoralty of Bernie Sanders =

1981–1989 mayoralty in Burlington, Vermont

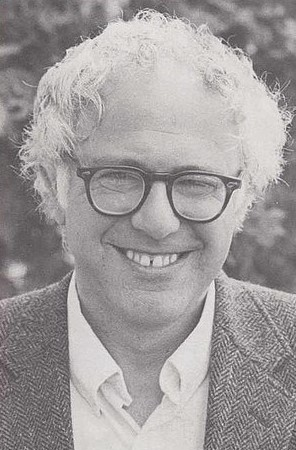
- Mayoralty of Bernie Sanders; April 6, 1981 – April 4, 1989
- Mayor: Bernie Sanders
- Party: Independent
- Election: 1981; 1983; 1985; 1987
- Seal of Burlington, Vermont

Bernie Sanders served as the 37th Mayor of Burlington, Vermont, from April 6, 1981, to April 4, 1989. Sanders' administration was the first socialist one in New England since the mayoralty of Jasper McLevy. He was regarded as a successful mayor that instituted multiple economic policies in Burlington, and was selected as one of the twenty best mayors in the United States by U.S. News & World Report in 1987. He was active in foreign affairs, primarily in Latin America in which he criticized the policy of the United States and visited Cuba, Nicaragua, and the Soviet Union, and was criticized for it by his opponents.

During his early tenure, Sanders feuded with the city council and other municipal leaders before forming a coalition of supporters in Burlington's government over the course of his tenure through local elections. During the 1982 elections, enough pro-Sanders candidates won seats in the city council to allow for vetoes made by Sanders to not be overridden by the city council. After the 1984 elections, Terry Bouricius, a progressive, became president of the city council. The pro-Sanders members of the city council lost a seat after the 1986 elections, but later regained a seat after the 1987 elections.

When Sanders left office in 1989, Bouricius, a member of the Burlington city council, stated that Sanders had "changed the entire nature of politics in Burlington and also in the state of Vermont". Future South Bend, Indiana mayor and Democratic presidential candidate Pete Buttigieg stated in his 2000 winning essay to the John F. Kennedy Presidential Library and Museum that Sanders was a "successful and popular mayor".

== Tenure ==
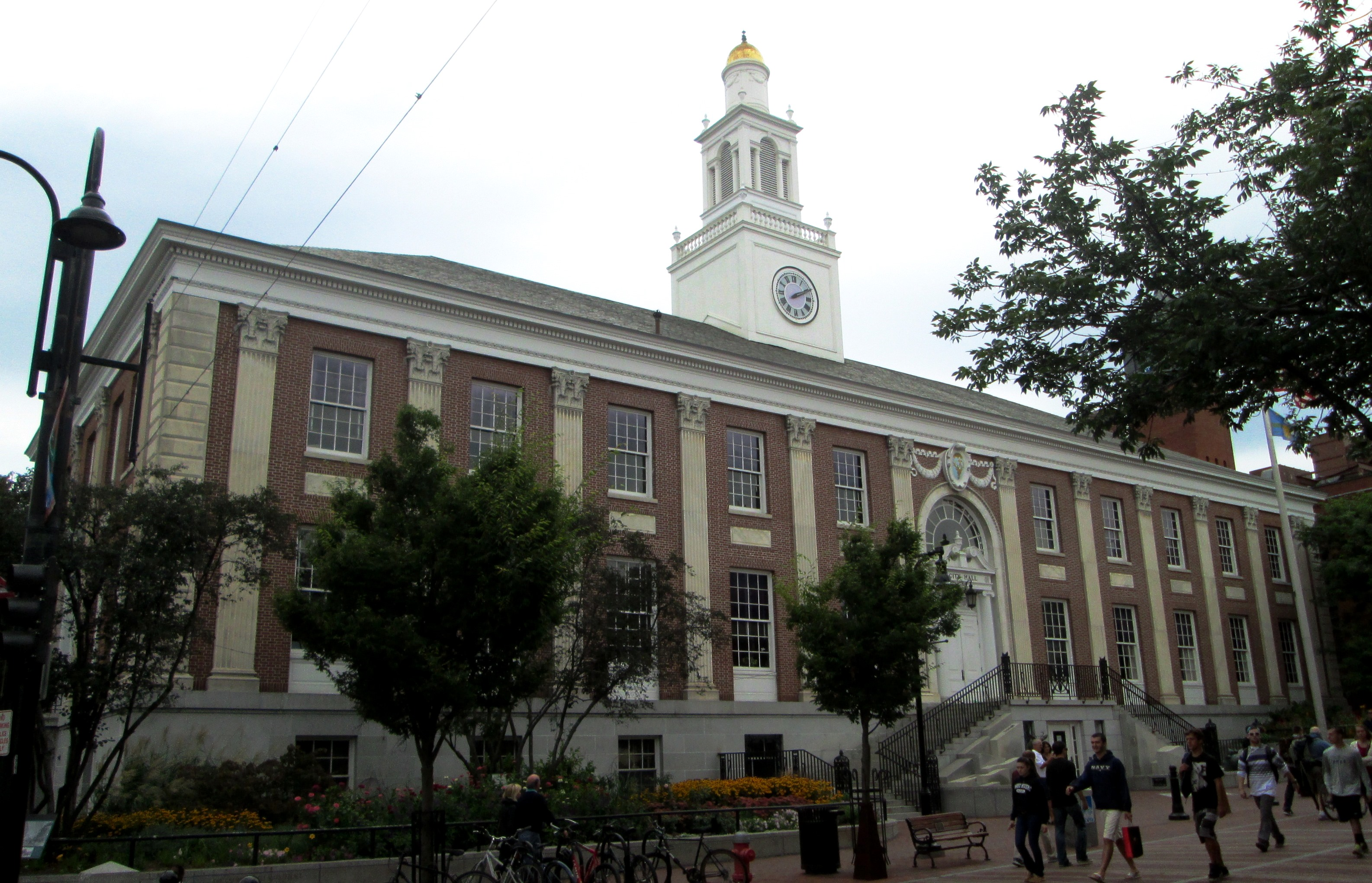
Burlington City Hall

Composition of the Burlington, Vermont city council after the 1982, 1983, and 1986 elections Pro-Sanders: 5 / 13 Republican: 5 / 13 Democratic: 3 / 13

Composition of the Burlington, Vermont city council after the 1984, 1985, and 1987 elections Pro-Sanders: 6 / 13 Republican: 5 / 13 Democratic: 2 / 13

Bernie Sanders was inaugurated as the 37th Mayor of Burlington, Vermont, on April 6, 1981, after defeating incumbent Democratic Mayor Gordon Paquette. Sanders was the first socialist mayor in New England since Jasper McLevy, who served as mayor of Bridgeport, Connecticut, during the 1940s and 1950s. He left office on April 4, 1989, and was succeeded by Peter Clavelle, one of his allies.

=== Approval ===
In 1983, a poll conducted with 400 respondents reported that 62% approved of Sanders' mayoralty while 21% disapproved and 17% were undecided. Sanders had an approval rating of 70% among voters below the age of 35 while having a 51% approval rating among voters above the age of 36. Sanders had a disapproval rating of 11% among voters below the age of 35, and had a 36% disapproval rating among voters above the age of 36. Regarding income, Sanders' approval rating was highest among voters who made less than $30,000 ($91,300 in 2023) per year. However, the group making more than $30,000 only had 3-5% less approve versus other brackets, and he still held a 65% approval rating among them. Ideologically, 5% of voters considered Sanders a conservative, and 70% considered Sanders a liberal.

In 1984, a poll conducted with 208 respondents and which had a 9% margin of error reported that 56.7% approved of Sanders while 26.9% disapproved and 16.3% were undecided.

Another poll conducted in 1984, with 321 respondents showed Sanders with a 67% approval rating. Among party affiliation he had a 77% approval rating and 10% disapproval rating among Democrats, a 64% approval rating and 13% disapproval rating among independents, and a 58% approval rating and 24% disapproval rating among Republicans. Based on household income, people with $0 to $10,000 ($29,300 in 2023) had a 68% approval rating and 8% disapproval rating of Sanders, people with $10,000 to $30,000 ($87,900 in 2023) had a 70% approval rating and 17% disapproval rating of Sanders, and people with over $30,000 had a 65% approval rating and 19% disapproval rating of Sanders.

Peter Diamondstone, the co-founder of the Liberty Union Party which Sanders had been a member of during the 1970s, criticized Sanders for his endorsement of Walter Mondale during the 1984 presidential election and referred to him as a Quisling.

In 1987, Sanders was selected as one of the twenty best mayors in the United States by U.S. News & World Report alongside William H. Hudnut III of Indianapolis, Indiana; Jerry Abramson of Louisville, Kentucky; Raymond Flynn of Boston, Massachusetts; Richard Caliguiri of Pittsburgh, Pennsylvania; Richard Green of Rochester, New Hampshire; Steve Carlson of Jamestown, New York; George Voinovich of Cleveland, Ohio; George Latimer of St. Paul, Minnesota; Henry Maier of Milwaukee, Wisconsin; Coleman Young of Detroit, Michigan; Joseph P. Riley Jr. of Charleston, South Carolina; Richard Arrington Jr. of Birmingham, Alabama, Henry Cisneros of San Antonio, Texas, Raúl L. Martínez of Hialeah, Florida, Tom Bradley of Los Angeles, California, Terry Goddard of Phoenix, Arizona, Charles Royer of Seattle, Washington; Robert M. Isaac of Colorado Springs, Colorado; and Don Peoples of Butte, Montana.

=== City government ===
Following his victory in the 1981 election Sanders faced difficulties with the city council of Burlington, Vermont, due to eleven of the thirteen members of the board of alderman opposing Sanders. The council would oppose measures proposed by Sanders and override his vetoes on legislation.

Sanders criticized the city council after they voted eight to three to fire his personal secretary which he stated was an insult to the mayor's office. Sanders later reached a compromise with the city council, wherein he could rehire his personal secretary. Sanders stated that it was "an absolute insult" when the city council voted to delay debate on his proposed 25¢ tax increase.

On June 1, 1981, the city council voted eleven to two to reject all of Sanders' non-reappointments except for the appointment of Henry Allard as fourth constable. Sanders filed a lawsuit against the city council after it rejected four of his nominees, but the lawsuit was thrown out of court by Chittenden Superior Court Judge James B. Morse. Sanders later unsuccessfully appealed to the Vermont Supreme Court. On April 12, 1982, the city council voted to approve Sanders' appointments of James Rader as city clerk, Jeanne Keller as assistant city clerk, and John Franco Jr. as assistant city attorney.

Sanders stated on December 31, 1981, that Burlington's Voter Registration Board's challenge to the residency of students who lived in dormitories was "pathetic" and "anti-democratic" and that the Republican and Democratic parties were being discriminatory against third parties. A lawsuit was filed against the Voter Registration Board and Sanders stated that he would testify against the board. He walked out of a city council meeting after the city council voted to have Joseph McNeil, the city attorney, defend the voter board. However, Sanders later reversed his decisions and stated that he would not testify in the case nor would he veto the city attorney defending the voter board, but would instead file a written memorandum.

During the 1982 elections three of the six pro-Sanders candidates won city council seats, allowing for vetoes made by Sanders to not be overridden, and two others were forced into runoffs that they were defeated in. This brought the total of pro-Sanders members of the city council to five. However, the Republicans and Democratic members of the city council united to select Robert Paterson, a Republican, as president of the city council instead of Sadie White, a Sanders supporter, by a vote of eight to five after six ballots and to prevent the pro-Sanders members of the city council from receiving positions. Sanders stated that "Probably the Democrats feel more comfortable dealing with the Republicans than with us". The composition of the city council was maintained after the 1983 elections.

In 1982, a three-page letter, signed by the heads of ten city departments, accused Sanders of usurping their power by talking directly with city employees, establishing advisory committees, and failing to consult with department heads on the city budget. Sanders stated that the department heads were "threatened" by his style of governance and that he would "apologize to no one".

During the 1984 elections the pro-Sanders members of the city council gained one seat from the Democratic Party bringing the composition of the city council to six pro-Sanders members, five Republican members, and two Democratic members. During Sanders' tenure as mayor only one progressive, Terry Bouricius, served as president of the city council from 1984 to 1985. The composition of the city council was maintained after the 1985 elections. William O. Skelton, a Republican, was elected in 1985, to serve as president of the city council and replace Bouricius.

The pro-Sanders members of the city council lost a seat to the Democratic Party in the 1986 elections bringing the composition of the city council to five pro-Sanders members, five Republican members, and three Democratic members. Although the pro-Sanders faction of the city council lost one seat they retained enough seats to uphold vetoes made by Sanders. The pro-Sanders members of the city council gained a seat from the Democratic Party in the 1987 elections bringing the composition of the city council to six pro-Sanders members, five Republican members, and two Democratic members.

=== Domestic policy ===
Sanders criticized President Ronald Reagan's budget cuts as "brutal" to poor and working-class people and that his cuts were causing "incalculable amounts of suffering". Sanders criticized the Vermont General Assembly in 1983, for not enacting progressive tax reform stating that the legislature was a joke and that "instead of a progressive tax system, they are talking about lowering the tax on corporations and increasing the taxes on potato chips". Sanders presided over a group of other New England mayors in Boston, Massachusetts, in 1985, during the writing of a resolution criticizing Reagan's proposed budget cuts towards domestic programs.

Sanders supported Vermont Housing Authority Deputy Director Richard Williams' policy of bringing the agency to Burlington to aid low-income people in rental assistance. Following his reelection in 1983, Sanders established the Community and Economic Development Office to aide in the development of affordable housing, more local small businesses, and greater community engagement. Sanders signed an agreement with the Bank of Vermont in 1984, making $1 million available for housing improvements.

Sanders proposed a $6.8 million budget for Burlington in 1982, which saw a $200,000 increase in building permit fees revenue and provided for substantial improvements in city services if a city rooms and meals tax was passed. The city council voted against allowing a nonbinding ballot question on the city rooms and meals tax. However, the question was included alongside two other proposed tax increases, but all three tax increases were defeated in the election. Sanders proposed the city room and meals tax again, but the city council voted seven to five against it.

In 1983, Sanders proposed $14.7 million budget, greater than the $12.6 million operating budget used in 1982, which proposed to use $1.7 million in capital improvements and a 2¢ reduction in property taxes, which was less than the 10¢ reduction proposed by Sanders during his mayoral campaign. The city council approved his budget.

The first pride parade was held in Burlington in 1983, and was supported by Sanders. In 1985, Sanders signed a city ordinance preventing housing discrimination against gay people, welfare recipients, elderly, and disabled. Amber LeMay, the founder of the House of LeMay, stated that “From what I understand, [Sanders] didn’t do anything specific for the gay community," and that Sanders “just treated them like he treated everyone else. He gave opportunities and the gay community took him up on them.”

Sanders joined the picket line of the United Electrical, Radio and Machine Workers of America during their strike in Windsor, Vermont in 1983. Sanders called for employees of the Medical Center Hospital of Vermont to organize into a labor union in 1987, to improve their working conditions and quality of healthcare.

Sanders proposed a $22.8 million budget in 1987, which called for a $5.3 million increase in education funding, a personal income tax for those making more than $60,000, and an increased corporate income tax.

An arts council was created by Sanders in 1981, using volunteers and donations. It was given city funding in 1983, and was later reformed into a city department in 1990. As of 2025, it has 19 employees and a budget of $3.4 million.

=== Foreign policy ===
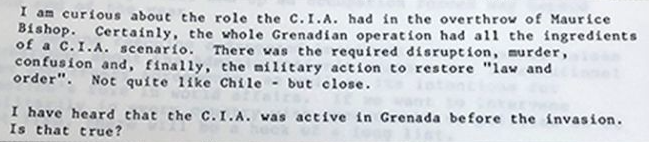
An excerpt of a letter from Mayor Bernie Sanders to Senator Patrick Leahy

Sanders supported the Sandinista National Liberation Front in Nicaragua

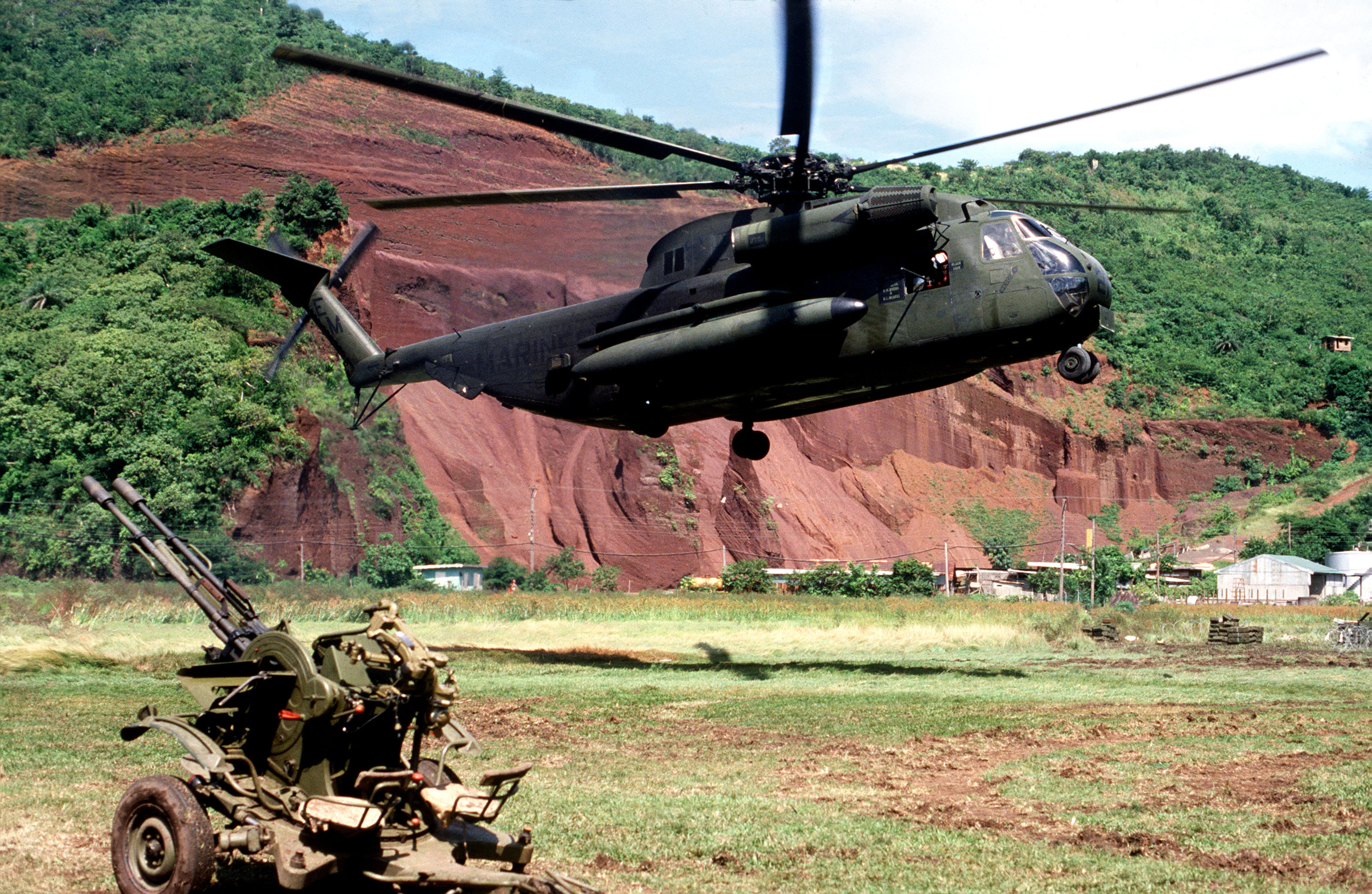
Sanders criticized and protested against the United States invasion of Grenada

Sanders called for students and faculty at the University of Vermont to support nuclear disarmament in 1982, stating that "you are not in the minority". During his tenure as mayor he declared October 17 to 24, as United Jewish Appeal Week to raise $100,000 for the United Jewish Appeal. During the 1983 mayoral election Sanders was criticized by James Gilson, the Republican nominee, for being too active in international politics stating that "Burlington doesn't need a foreign policy".

In 1981, Sanders wrote to President Reagan informing him that voters in Burlington approved a referendum calling for the halting of the United States' aid to El Salvador and to recall all military advisers from the country. In 1983, Sanders introduced Arnaldo Ramos, a representative of the Democratic Revolutionary Front, who spoke to a crowd of 120 people about the United States' involvement in El Salvador.

Although Sanders had participated in anti-war activism himself during his youth he was against an anti-war protest which planned to blockade the General Electric plant in Burlington due to its production of high-speed machine guns which were being used in Central America. He stated that "not everybody has the luxury of choosing where they are going to work or the money not to work" and supported the unionized General Electric workers. The activists were later arrested by police during their blockade of the factory.

Juan Garcia, a representative of the Chilean Ministry of the Interior and Public Security, was sent to Vermont in 1983, to study democracy for the purpose of what he learned being applied during Chile's transition from a military government to a civilian government by 1989. Sanders criticized Garcia's visit as a "cheap, disgraceful public relations gimmick which is attempting to make acceptable one of the most bloody governments in recent Western Hemisphere history".

Sanders wrote a letter to Reagan on October 17, 1983, calling for him to end the CIA's war in Central America stating that "in the strongest possible terms, I urge you to stop the CIA war against the people of Nicaragua and allow them to develop their independent nation as best they can". Sanders wrote a letter to Reagan in December 1986, informing him that Burlington voters had voted 7,001 to 5,914 in a referendum to condemn the United States' aid to the Contras in Nicaragua. On April 23, 1984, Sanders met with a Nicaraguan official at the Nicaraguan Embassy in Washington, D.C., who suggested that Puerto Cabezas could become a sister city to Burlington. Sanders spoke at a rally celebrating the fifth anniversary of the Nicaraguan Revolution in 1984. Sanders later introduced Edgard Parrales, a Nicaraguan priest and a representative from the Organization of American States, who stated that American propaganda was causing elections in Nicaragua to be delayed and criticized the United States' policy in Nicaragua. On July 16, 1985, Sanders visited Nicaragua where he patriated in a rally attended by over 400,000 people on July 19, celebrating the sixth anniversary of the Nicaraguan Revolution, where Sanders was the highest-ranking American official attending. A spokesman for the Nicaragua embassy in Washington, D.C., stated that Sanders was one of the "real friends of Nicaragua".

Sanders participated in an anti-war march following the United States invasion of Grenada and criticized the United States for its hypocritical condemnation of the Soviet invasion of Afghanistan and Poland while simultaneously invading Grenada. Sanders also wrote a letter to Senator Patrick Leahy asking him about the role the CIA played in the overthrowing of Maurice Bishop, the leader of Grenada, stating that “I am curious about the role the C.I.A. had in the overthrow of Maurice Bishop. Certainly, the whole Grenadian operation had all the ingredients of a C.I.A. scenario. There was the required disruption, murder, confusion and, finally, the military action to restore ‘law and order,'”. A resolution calling for the withdraw of United States soldiers from Grenada failed after a five to five vote in the city council. Sanders participated in an anti-war march in Washington, D.C., which was attended by over 50,000 people.

The United States Department of State issued a decision prohibiting diplomats, businessmen, and journalists from the Soviet Union from Chittenden County, Vermont. Sanders supported a resolution protesting the decision, but the resolution failed in the city council by a vote of eight to five. In 1988, Sanders led a delegation to Yaroslavl, Soviet Union, to establish a sister city program with the city which was accepted by Yaroslavl. A three-member Soviet delegation from Yaroslavl, which consisted of Yaroslavl Mayor Alexander Ryabkov, Medical college director Yuri Novikov, and machine factory director Sergi Verkhovets, came to Burlington, Vermont, from October 8 to 14. On October 14, 1988, the Sanders and Ryabkov signed an agreement creating the sister city program between the two cities.

In March 1989, Sanders and his wife traveled to Cuba to meet with Cuban mayors.

== Elections ==
=== 1981 ===
Bernie Sanders announced on November 8, 1980, that he would seek the mayoral office and formally announced his campaign on December 16, at a press conference in city hall. Sanders selected Linda Niedweske to serve as his campaign manager. The Citizens Party attempted to have Greg Guma run with their nomination for mayor, but Guma declined as it would be "difficult to run against another progressive candidate". Sanders had been convinced to run for the mayoralty by Richard Sugarman, an Orthodox Jewish scholar at the University of Vermont, who had shown Sanders a ward-by-ward breakdown of the 1976 Vermont gubernatorial election, in which Sanders had run in, which shown him receiving 12% of the vote in Burlington despite only getting 6% statewide.

Sanders won in the mayoral election initially by twenty-two votes against Paquette, Bove, and McGrath, but it was later reduced to ten votes. Paquette did not contest the results of the recount.

Paquette's loss of the election was attributed to his own shortcomings, as he did not campaign or promote his candidacy since both Sanders and Independent candidate Richard Bove were not seen as a serious challengers, as Sanders had not previously won an election. Paquette was also considered to have lost because he proposed an unpopular 65 cent per $100 raise in taxes that Sanders opposed. Sanders had spent around $4,000 during the campaign.

=== 1983 ===
Sanders formed a coalition between independents and the Citizens Party. Sanders announced on December 3, 1982, that he would seek reelection as mayor at Burlington's city hall. On January 22, 1983, the Citizen Party voted unanimously to endorse Sanders, although Sanders ran as an independent. In the mayoral election Sanders defeated Judith Stephany and James Gilson. Sanders spent $33,000 during the campaign.

=== 1985 ===
Sanders initially considered not seeking a third term as Mayor of Burlington, Vermont, but announced on December 5, 1984, that he would seek a third term. Sanders formally launched his campaign on December 7. Sanders won in the mayoral election. During the campaign Sanders had raised $24,428, spent $24,384, and had remaining debts of $555.

=== 1987 ===
Sanders, who had recently came in third in the 1986 Vermont gubernatorial election, announced on December 1, 1986, that he would seek reelection to a fourth term as Mayor of Burlington, Vermont, despite close associates stating that he was tired of being mayor. Sanders stated that he would not seek another mayoral term after the 1987 election stating that "eight years is enough and I think it is time for new leadership, which does exist within the coalition, to come up". Sanders defeated Democratic nominee Paul Lafayette in the mayoral election. During the campaign Sanders raised $37,480, spent $37,034, and had remaining debts of $2,020.

== See also ==
- List of elected socialist mayors in the United States

== Works cited ==
- Lamdin, Courtney (May 7, 2025). "Burlington's Money Woes Are Forcing Difficult Decisions". Seven Days. Archived from the original on May 8, 2025.
