= 2018 Burlington, Vermont mayoral election =

2018 Burlington mayoral election
- March 6, 2018
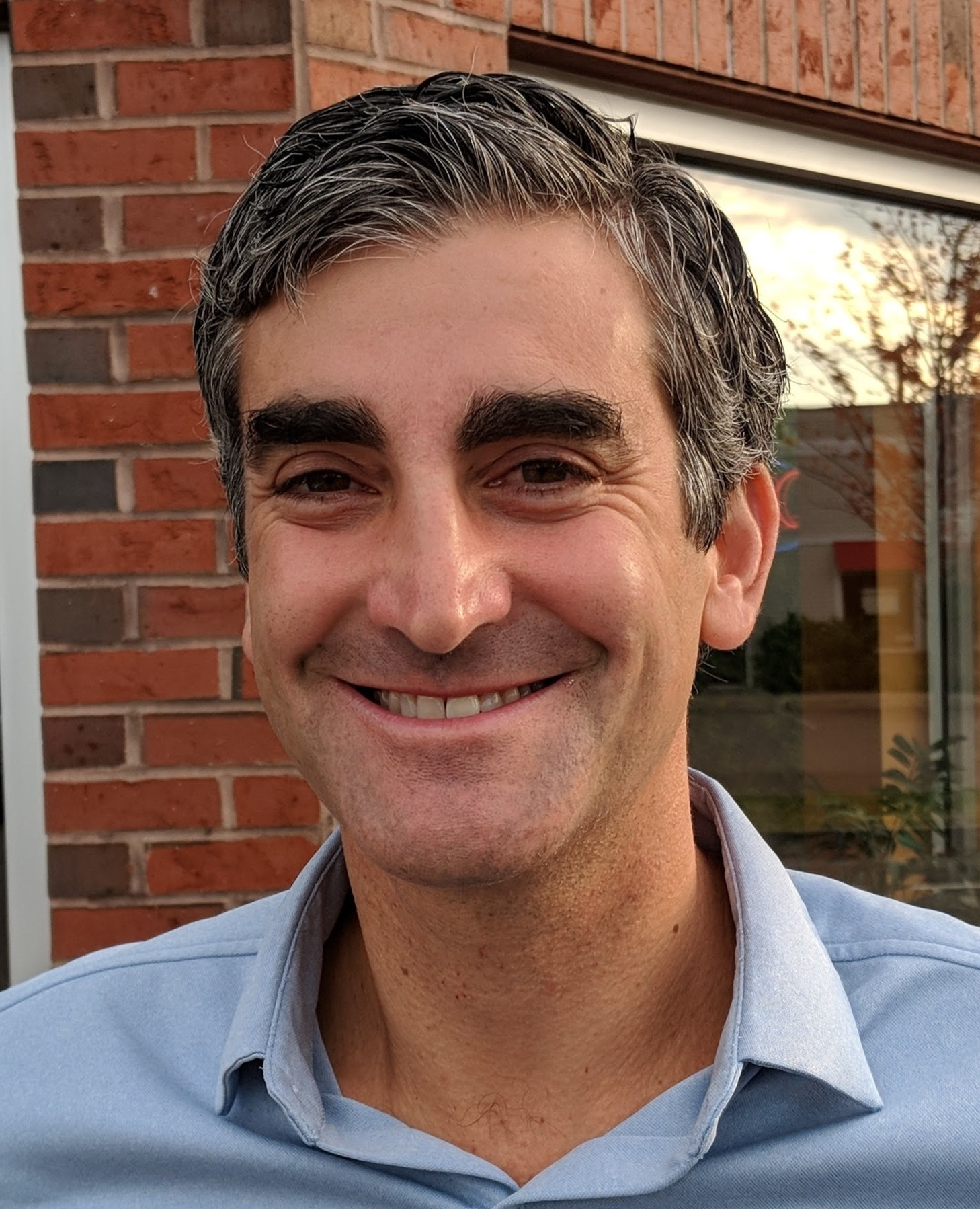

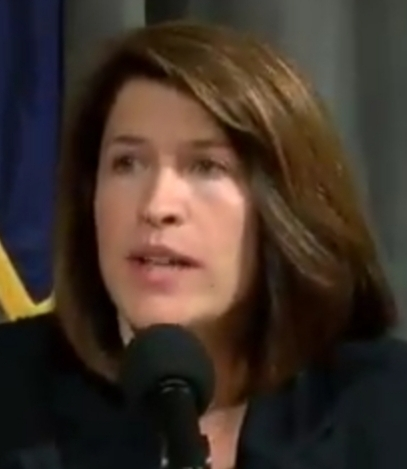

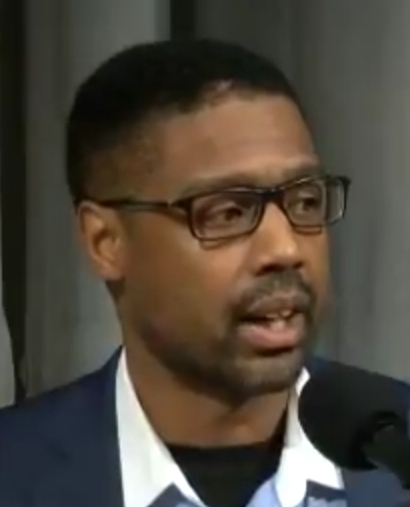
Nominee	Miro Weinberger	Carina Driscoll	Infinite Culcleasure
Party	Democratic	Independent	Independent
Popular vote	5,749	4,155	1,910
Percentage	48.38%	34.96%	16.07%
- Results by city council district Weinberger: Weinberger—40-50% Weinberger—50–60% Weinberger—60-70% Driscoll: Driscoll—30-40% Driscoll—40-50% Culcleasure: Culcleasure—40-50%
Mayor before election
Miro Weinberger
Democratic
Elected mayor
Miro Weinberger
Democratic

The 2018 Burlington mayoral election was held on March 6, 2018. Incumbent Democratic Mayor Miro Weinberger defeated independent candidates Carina Driscoll, who had the support of the Vermont Progressive Party, and Infinite Culcleasure.

Weinberger won the Democratic nomination without opposition while Driscoll won the endorsement of the Progressives against Culcleasure. Driscoll attempted to unite her campaign with Culcleasure's due to the city's usage of first-past-the-post voting, but Culcleasure declined. Weinberger won against Driscoll and Culcleasure with a plurality of the vote.

== Background ==
Miro Weinberger was elected as mayor of Burlington, Vermont, in the 2012 mayoral election becoming the first member of the Democratic Party to hold the mayoralty since Gordon Paquette. He was reelected in the 2015 election.

After the 2017 city council election, all three Democratic incumbents won reelection, and the party gained one seat, making the composition of the twelve-member city council six Democratic members, three Progressive members, two independent members, and one Republican member.

== Campaign ==
=== Candidates ===
==== Democratic ====
The Democratic Party gave its endorsement to Weinberger without opposition at its caucus on January 7, 2018. Weinberger launched his mayoral campaign at the Democratic caucus. Jordan Redell served as Weinberger's campaign manager.

==== Independents ====
Carina Driscoll, who had served in the Vermont House of Representatives and on the Burlington city council and was the step-daughter of former Mayor Bernie Sanders, announced that she was considering running a mayoral campaign in 2017. Driscoll announced that she would run as an independent candidate for mayor on December 4, 2017. Elise Greaves served as Driscoll's campaign manager.

Infinite Culcleasure, a community organizer, announced that he would run as an independent candidate for mayor on December 1, 2017.

At the Vermont Progressive Party's caucus Driscoll won the party's endorsement with 116 votes against Culcleasure's 84 votes after being nominated by Representative Selene Colburn. Driscoll declined to seek the endorsement of the Democratic and Republican parties.

=== General election ===
During the campaign Driscoll attempted to unite her and Culcleasure's campaigns stating that “I think there is a ton of overlap and shared common ground with who we want to represent and the work we want to do". She also attempted to unite the campaigns as due to Burlington's usage of first-past-the-post voting "the mayor can win on a plurality". However, Culcleasure refused to drop out of the election stating that "Being coerced to drop out of a campaign for public office has been one of the most anti-democratic adventures I have ever experienced".

Weinberger won in the general election with 48.38% of the popular vote against Driscoll's 34.96% and Culcleasure's 16.07%. During the campaign Weinberger raised over $107,000, Driscoll raised over $47,000, and Culcleasure raised over $10,000.

The composition of the city council did not change as all incumbent won reelection and Sara Moore, the only incumbent to not run for reelection, was replaced by another member of the Progressive Party.

== Results ==
2018 Burlington mayoral election
Party	Candidate	Votes	%	±%
Democratic	Miro Weinberger (incumbent)	5,749	48.38%	−19.89%
Independent	Carina Driscoll	4,155	34.96%	+34.96%
Independent	Infinite Culcleasure	1,910	16.07%	+16.07%
Write-in		70	0.59%	–0.06%
Total votes		11,884	100.00%	
Democratic hold				

=== Results by ward ===
Ward	Weinberger	Votes	Driscoll	Votes	Culcleasure	Votes	Write-ins	Votes	Total votes	Votes
Ward 1	47.99%	526	32.66%	358	18.98%	208	0.36%	4	100.00%	1,096
Ward 2	25.27%	281	38.67%	430	35.79%	398	0.27%	3	100.00%	1,112
Ward 3	35.58%	528	41.37%	614	22.84%	339	0.20%	3	100.00%	1,484
Ward 4	59.02%	1,259	34.46%	735	5.86%	125	0.66%	14	100.00%	2,133
Ward 5	53.01%	1,004	36.75%	696	9.93%	188	0.32%	6	100.00%	1,894
Ward 6	60.32%	935	28.90%	448	10.39%	161	0.39%	6	100.00%	1,550
Ward 7	51.25%	900	40.26%	707	6.95%	122	1.54%	27	100.00%	1,756
Ward 8	36.79%	316	19.44%	167	42.96%	369	0.81%	7	100.00%	859

== Endorsements ==
Driscoll endorsements

Political parties

- Vermont Progressive Party

Organizations

- Our Revolution

Newspapers

- The Burlington Free Press
Weinberger endorsements

Local officials

- Kurt Wright, member of the Burlington, Vermont city council from the 4th district

Organizations

- Burlington Police Officers Association
