= 1979 Burlington, Vermont mayoral election =

- March 6, 1979
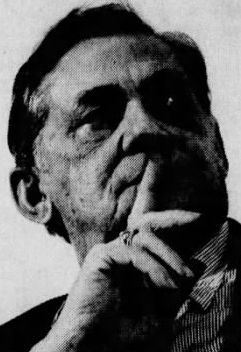
Nominee	Gordon Paquette
Party	Democratic
Popular vote	5,089
Percentage	98.70%
Mayor of Burlington before election
Gordon Paquette
Democratic
Elected Mayor of Burlington
Gordon Paquette
Democratic

The 1979 Burlington mayoral election was held on March 6, 1979, in order to elect the Mayor of Burlington, Vermont. Incumbent Democratic Mayor Gordon Paquette was easily re-elected to a fifth term.

== Background ==
Gordon Paquette, a member of the city council, won election to the mayoralty of Burlington, Vermont, with the Democratic nomination in the 1971 election. Paquette was reelected as mayor in the 1973, 1975, and 1977 elections with him taking over seventy percent of the popular vote in each election except in 1977.

== General election ==
Terence O'Brien, a member of the city council from the 4th ward, considered running against Paquette, but resigned on December 11, 1978, and accepted a job in Virginia. Paquette announced that he would seek reelection on January 26, 1979, and received the Democratic nomination on February 2.

The Republican Party did not nominate a candidate. Carol Brown launched a write-in campaign on February 28, in response to the Republicans not fielding a candidate.

=== Results ===
General election results, March 6, 1979
Party	Candidate	Votes	%
Democratic	Gordon Paquette (incumbent)	5,089	98.70
Write-In	Carol Brown	67	1.30
Total votes		5,156	100.00
Democratic hold			
