= Terry Bouricius =

American politician (born 1954)

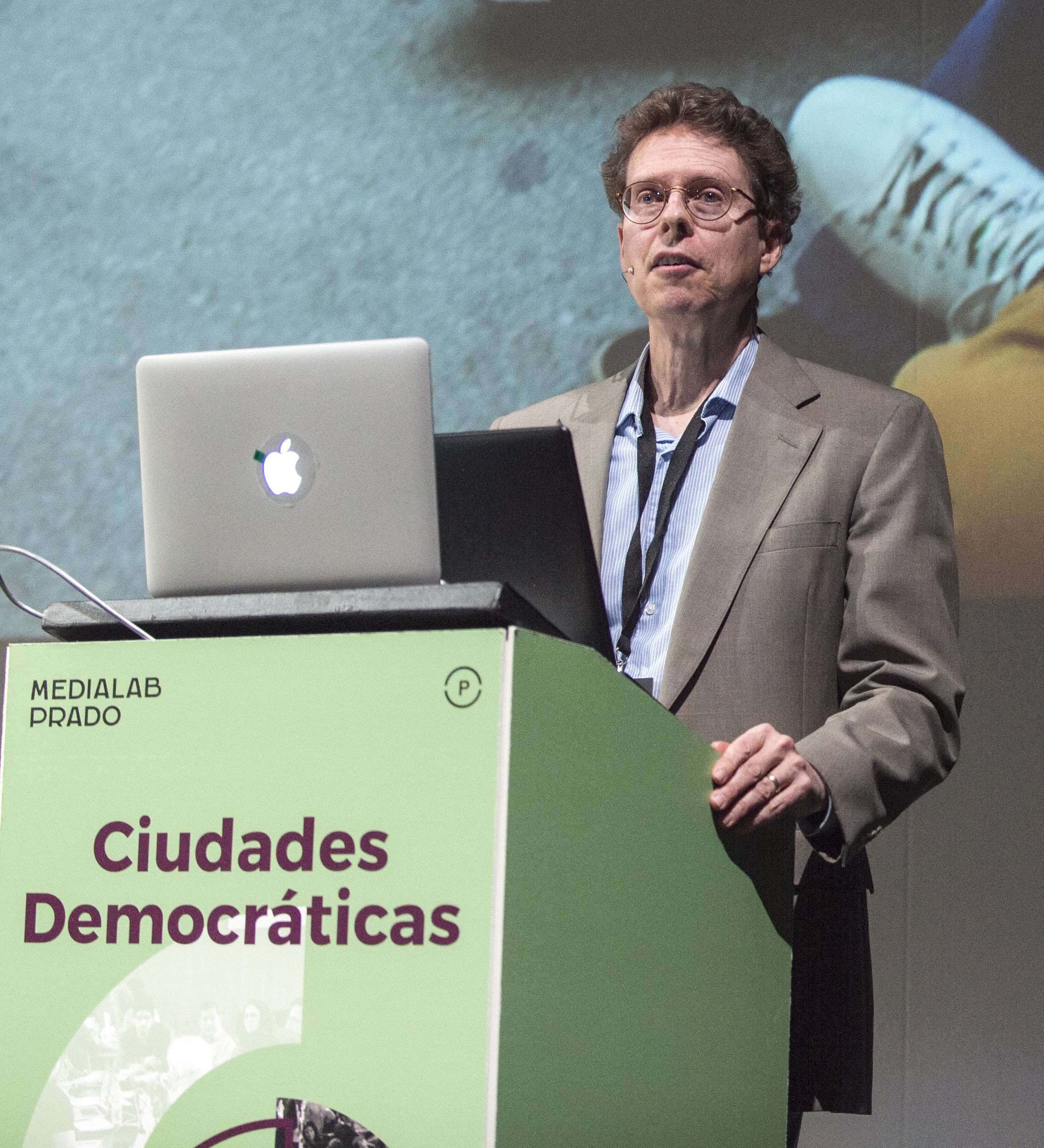

Member of the Vermont House of Representatives from the Chittenden-7-4 district
- In office January 9, 1991 – 2001
- Preceded by: Ben Truman
- Succeeded by: Carina Driscoll

President of the Burlington, Vermont city council
- In office 1984–1985
- Succeeded by: William Skelton

Member of the Burlington, Vermont city council from the 2nd district
- In office April 6, 1981 – 1991
- Preceded by: Marion Fisher

Chair of the Liberty Union Party
- In office 1977–1978
- Preceded by: Bernie Sanders
- Succeeded by: Jack Craven

Personal details
- Born: March 27, 1954 (age 72) New Mexico, U.S.
- Party: Liberty Union (before 1980); Democratic (1980); Citizens (1980–1985); Vermont Progressive (after 1985)
- Spouse: Catherine Lamb
- Children: 2
- Education: Middlebury College (BA)

Terrill G. Bouricius (born March 27, 1954) is an American politician who served in the Vermont House of Representatives from the Chittenden-7-4 district from 1991 to 2001, as a member of the Vermont Progressive Party. Prior to his tenure in the state house, he served on the city council in Burlington, Vermont, from 1981 to 1991, from the 2nd district, and served as president of the city council.

Bouricius was born in New Mexico, and educated at Middlebury College. He entered politics with his activity in the Liberty Union Party, where he served as chair of the Addison County affiliate and the statewide party, and ran for a seat in the Vermont Senate twice with their nomination. He left the Liberty Union Party to aid in the creation of the Citizens Party, and ran for state senate and lieutenant governor.

Bouricius was elected to the city council in Burlington, becoming the first member of the Citizens Party elected in the United States. He was an ally to Mayor Bernie Sanders, and served one term as president of the city council. He ran for a seat in the state house in 1986, and lost by six votes to Ben Truman, but later defeated Truman in the 1990 election and served until his retirement in 2000. He and Tom Smith were the first members of the Progressive Coalition elected to the state house.

== Early life and education ==
Terrill G. Bouricius was born in New Mexico on March 27, 1954. He graduated from Middlebury College with a Bachelor of Arts degree in political science in 1976. He married Catherine Lamb, with whom he had two children.

== Career ==
=== Early campaigns ===
Bouricius announced that he would run for a seat in the Vermont Senate from Addison County with the nomination of the Liberty Union Party during the 1976 election, but placed fifth out of five candidates. Bouricius ran for one of six seats to the state senate from Chittenden County with the Liberty Union Party's nomination, but placed last. During the 1980 election he ran for the Democratic nomination for a seat in the state senate from Chittenden County, but lost in the primary. However, the Citizens Party later gave him their nomination to run, but he placed eighth out of nine candidates.

Bouricius served as chair of the Liberty Union Party in Addison County. Bouricius was selected to serve as chair of the Liberty Union Party after Bernie Sanders left the party in 1977, and served until he was replaced by Jack Craven following his resignation in 1978. In 1980, Earl Gardner, John Franco, and Bouricius, who were all former members of the Liberty Union Party, aided in the creation of the Citizens Party in Vermont.

Bouricius ran for lieutenant governor in the 1982 election and was endorsed by the party at its state convention. He won the Citizens nomination without opposition, but lost in the election won by Republican nominee Peter Plympton Smith. He was the Citizens' candidate to receive the most support statewide in the 1982 election, but the party lost major party status, which it had gained after the 1980 election, as none of their statewide candidates received more than 5% of the popular vote.

=== Local politics ===
==== Elections ====
Bouricius was given the Citizens nomination to run for a seat on the city council in Burlington, Vermont, from the 2nd district in 1981. Marion Fisher, the incumbent Democratic member of the city council, refused to debate Bouricius. Bouricius defeated Fisher in the election becoming the first member of the Citizens Party elected to office in the United States.

He won reelection in the 1983 election against Democratic nominee Esther Sorrell, a former member of the state senate, after spending $617 against Sorrell's $641. He won reelection in the 1985 election against Democratic nominee John H. Bartlett Jr. with the nomination of the Progressive Coalition. He won reelection in the 1987 election against Democratic nominee Rick Sharp after raising $1,630, spending $2,088, and having a remaining debt of $458. Bouricius sought reelection to the city council instead of seeking the mayoralty in the 1989 election and defeated Democratic nominee Ian C. Galbraith and Liberty Union nominee Ian Garth Diamondstone. Dana Clark was elected in the 1991 election to succeed Bouricius.

Bouricius, Jonathan Leopold, the city treasurer, and Peter Clavelle, the Community and Economic Development Director, were considered the most likely candidates for the coalition's nomination for the 1989 mayoral election. Gene Bergman, the chair of the coalition, stated that he believed the choices at the caucus would be Leopold, Bouricius, and Clavelle. Bouricius offered his name for consideration, but did not actively campaign for the endorsement of the coalition. Bouricius gave a speech at the caucus giving his support to Clavelle who won the coalition's nomination.

==== Tenure ====
Bernie Sanders, who had been endorsed by the Citizens Party, defeated incumbent Democratic Mayor Gordon Paquette by ten votes in the 1981 mayoral election. Following his victory in the 1981 election Sanders faced difficulties with the city council due to eleven of the thirteen members of the board of alderman opposing Sanders. The council would oppose measures proposed by Sanders and override his vetoes on legislation. Bouricius and Sadie White were the only members of the city council aligned with Sanders.

After the 1982 elections there were five pro-Sanders members on the thirteen-member city council. However, the Republicans and Democratic members of the city council united to select Robert Paterson, a Republican, as president of the city council instead of Sadie White, a Sanders supporter, by a vote of eight to five after six ballots and to prevent the pro-Sanders members of the city council from receiving positions.

The pro-Sanders members gained one seat from the Democratic Party during the 1984 city council elections bringing the composition of the city council to six Progressive members, five Republican members, and two Democratic members. Bouricius was selected to serve as president of the city council after thirty-one ballots and served until 1985. Bouricius was the only member of the Progressive Coalition to serve as president during Sanders' administration. Bouricius announced on December 26, 1984, that he would seek reelection to the city council and that he would seek another term as president. After the 1985 elections William Skelton, a Republican member of the city council, was selected to serve as president of the city council against the Progressive-backed Zoe Breiner as Bouricius had dropped out.

During his tenure on the city council Bouricius served as chair of the Civil Defense committee. He was selected to serve on the executive committee of the Progressive Coalition in 1988. Bouricius worked as Sanders' treasurer for his campaign for a seat in the United States House of Representatives in the 1988 election.

=== Vermont House of Representatives ===
==== Elections ====
On June 25, 1986, Bouricius announced that he would run for a seat in the Vermont House of Representatives from the Chittenden 7-4 district to succeed Democratic Representative Howard Dean. He ran as an independent candidate, but was defeated by Democratic nominee Ben Truman by one vote. Bouricius filed for a recount no November 8, but Truman's victory was increased to six votes by the recount. He requested for a new election to be held, but Judge Matthew Katz rejected the request.

Bouricius announced that he would run for a seat in the state house in the 1990 election against incumbent Representative Truman. During the campaign Bouricius had been endorsed by Sanders, the Vermont Progressive Alliance, and the Rainbow Coalition. Bouricius defeated Truman in the election. Bouricius and Tom Smith were the first members of the Progressive Coalition elected to the state house and the first members of a third-party elected to the state legislature in seventy-four years.

He won reelection without opposition in the 1992, 1996, and 1998 elections. He defeated Democratic nominee Thomas C. Nuovo in the 1994 election. Bouricius did not run for reelection to the state house in the 2000 election and was succeeded by Progressive nominee Carina Driscoll.

==== Tenure ====
Bouricius supported Ralph G. Wright for Speaker of the House in 1991. During his tenure in the state house Bouricius served on the Commerce, Ways and Means, and Agriculture committees, but he stated that he was placed on the Agriculture committee as punishment for trying to get other Progressives elected.

== Later life ==
During the 2002 gubernatorial election Bouricius supported Progressive nominee Michael Badamo. He became a policy analyst for FairVote. He endorsed David Zuckerman for lieutenant governor during the 2016 election. During the 2019 elections he supported Perri Freeman for a seat on the Burlington city council.

Bouricius refers to himself as a "recovering politician" and has become an outspoken critic of electoral democracy. His experiences in office and as an electoral reform analyst at FairVote convinced him that electoral democracy is fundamentally undemocratic, as it excludes all but a small political class the opportunity to participate formally in government policy.

== Political positions ==
In 1992, Bouricius sponsored legislation to increase the minimum wage in Vermont from $4.25 to $5.50. Bouricius supported legislation to ban smoking in public areas in 1993. He supported the creation of a single-payer healthcare system. In 2000, the state house voted seventy-six to sixty-nine, with Bouricius in favor, in favor of legislation to allow same-sex couples to have marriage benefits through civil unions.

=== Foreign policy ===
Fergus O'Hare, a civil rights activist from Northern Ireland, asked for members of the city council to introduce a resolution calling for the British government to give prisoners in the H-Block wing of the Maze Prison political status. Bouricius introduced the resolution for O'Hare. In 1983, the city council voted eight to five, with Bouricius in favor, against a resolution protesting the United States Department of State's decision to ban Soviet diplomats, journalists, and businessmen from entering Chittenden County. Bouricius opposed President Ronald Reagan's decision to implement an embargo against Nicaragua. Bouricius criticized President George H. W. Bush's plan to send $3 million to anti-Sandinista National Liberation Front candidates in Nicaragua's 1990 elections.

=== Government ===
Bouricius proposed a change to Burlington's city charter which would have changed the Board of Aldermen to the gender-neutral city council which the city council voted nine to four in favor of the legislation and was approved by a referendum. He supported the abolition of the Vermont Senate.

== Electoral history ==
Terry Bouricius electoral history

1976 Vermont Senate Addison County election
Party	Candidate	Votes	%
Republican	Arthur Gibb (incumbent)	608	33.63%
Republican	S. Seeley Reynolds (incumbent)	595	32.91%
Democratic	John Angier	308	17.04%
Democratic	Marguerite Stebbins	258	14.27%
Liberty Union	Terry Bouricius	39	2.16%
Total votes		1,808	100.00%

1980 Vermont Senate Chittenden County election
Party	Candidate	Votes	%
Democratic	Thomas M. Crowley	26,807	14.67%
Democratic	Sarah T. Soule	24,842	13.59%
Democratic	Esther Sorrell	24,723	13.53%
Democratic	Robert V. Daniels	24,020	13.15%
Democratic	Mark A. Kaplan	23,780	13.01%
Democratic	E. Douglas McSweeney (incumbent)	23,125	12.66%
Republican	J. Dennis Delaney	23,044	12.61%
Citizens	Terry Bouricius	6,346	3.47%
Citizens	Gary C. Widrick	6,042	3.31%
Total votes		182,729	100.00%

1981 Burlington, Vermont city council 2nd district election
Party	Candidate	Votes	%
Citizens	Terry Bouricius	517	51.86%
Democratic	Marion Fisher (incumbent)	480	48.14%
Total votes		997	100.00%

1982 Vermont lieutenant gubernatorial Citizens primary
Party	Candidate	Votes	%
Citizens	Terry Bouricius	272	94.77%
Write-in		15	5.23%
Total votes		287	100.00%

1982 Vermont lieutenant gubernatorial election
Party	Candidate	Votes	%
Republican	Peter Plympton Smith	93,212	57.60%
Democratic	Thomas C. Ryan	57,976	35.83%
Citizens	Terry Bouricius	6,192	3.83%
Liberty Union	Nancy Egan Sternbach	4,237	2.62%
Write-in		212	0.13%
Total votes		161,829	100.00%

1983 Burlington, Vermont city council 2nd district election
Party	Candidate	Votes	%	±%
Citizens	Terry Bouricius (incumbent)	1,038	59.38%	+7.52%
Democratic	Esther Sorrell	710	40.62%	−7.52%
Total votes		1,748	100.00%	

1985 Burlington, Vermont city council 2nd district election
Party	Candidate	Votes	%	±%
Progressive	Terry Bouricius (incumbent)	765	66.70%	+7.32%
Democratic	John H. Bartlett Jr.	382	33.30%	−7.32%
Total votes		1,147	100.00%	

1986 Vermont House of Representatives Chittenden 7-4 district election
Party	Candidate	Votes	%
Democratic	Ben Truman	524	50.29%
Independent	Terry Bouricius	518	49.71%
Total votes		1,042	100.00%

1987 Burlington, Vermont city council 2nd district election
Party	Candidate	Votes	%	±%
Progressive	Terry Bouricius (incumbent)	906	54.32%	−12.38%
Democratic	Rick Sharp	762	45.68%	+12.38%
Total votes		1,668	100.00%	

1989 Burlington, Vermont city council 2nd district election
Party	Candidate	Votes	%	±%
Progressive	Terry Bouricius (incumbent)	728	62.76%	+8.44%
Democratic	Ian C. Galbraith	367	31.64%	−14.04%
Liberty Union	Ian Garth Diamondstone	65	5.60%	+5.60%
Total votes		1,160	100.00%	

1990 Vermont House of Representatives Chittenden 7-4 district election
Party	Candidate	Votes	%
Progressive	Terry Bouricius	587	52.18%
Democratic	Ben Truman (incumbent)	533	47.38%
Write-in		5	0.44%
Total votes		1,125	100.00%

1992 Vermont House of Representatives Chittenden 7-4 district election
Party	Candidate	Votes	%	±%
Progressive	Terry Bouricius (incumbent)	1,097	100.00%	+47.82%
Total votes		1,097	100.00%	

1994 Vermont House of Representatives Chittenden 7-4 district election
Party	Candidate	Votes	%	±%
Progressive	Terry Bouricius (incumbent)	580	54.98%	−45.02%
Democratic	Thomas C. Nuovo	475	45.02%	+45.02%
Total votes		1,055	100.00%	

1996 Vermont House of Representatives Chittenden 7-4 district election
Party	Candidate	Votes	%	±%
Progressive	Terry Bouricius (incumbent)	1,097	92.10%	+37.12%
Write-in		76	7.90%	+7.90%
Total votes		962	100.00%	

1998 Vermont House of Representatives Chittenden 7-4 district election
Party	Candidate	Votes	%	±%
Progressive	Terry Bouricius (incumbent)	561	94.60%	+2.50%
Write-in		32	5.40%	-2.50%
Total votes		593	100.00%	

== See also ==
- Sortition

== Bibliography ==
- (2013) Democracy through Multi-body Sortition .
- (2013) An Idealized Design for the Legislative Branch of Government .
- (2014) An Idealized Design for Government .
- (2018) Why Hybrid Bicameralism is Not Right for Sortition .
- (2026) Democracy Without Politicians: Government By The People
