= 1988 United States House of Representatives election in Vermont =

- November 8, 1988
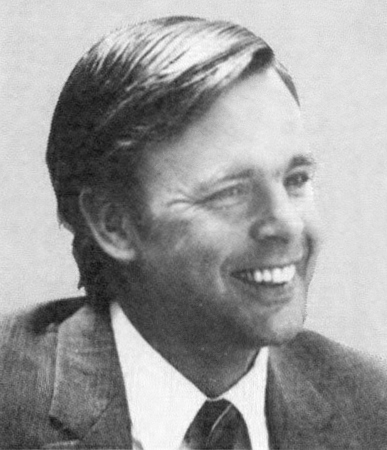

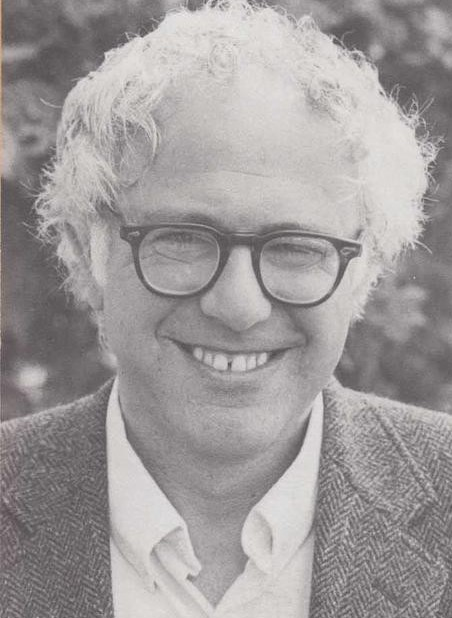

Nominee	Peter Plympton Smith	Bernie Sanders	Paul N. Poirier
Party	Republican	Independent	Democratic
Popular vote	98,937	90,026	45,330
Percentage	41.20%	37.49%	18.88%
- Smith 30–40% 40–50% 50–60% 60–70% 70–80% 80–90% Sanders 30–40% 40–50% 50–60% 60–70% 70–80% Poirier 30–40% 40–50%
Representative before election
Jim Jeffords
Republican
Elected Representative
Peter Plympton Smith
Republican

The 1988 United States House of Representatives election in Vermont was held on November 8, 1988. Republican nominee Peter Plympton Smith defeated Independent candidate Bernie Sanders and Democratic nominee Paul N. Poirier.

Incumbent Republican Representative Jim Jeffords chose to run for a seat in the United States Senate instead of seeking reelection to the United States House of Representatives. Former Lieutenant Governor Peter Plympton Smith won the Republican nomination against David Gates. State Representative Paul N. Poirier won the Democratic nomination against Peter Welch, James A. Guest and Dolores Sandoval. Sanders, the Mayor of Burlington, ran as an Independent candidate.

This is the most recent election in which a Republican was elected to the U.S. House of Representatives from Vermont's at-large congressional district. With the results in the concurrent presidential and Senate elections, it is also the most recent election in which Vermont voted Republican in all three federal statewide offices simultaneously.

== Background ==
From 1854 to 1958, the Vermont Republican Party won every statewide election in Vermont. William H. Meyer became the first member of the Democratic Party to win a statewide election in Vermont since 1853, when he won election to the United States House of Representatives from Vermont's at-large congressional district in the 1958 election.

Jim Jeffords, a member of the Republican Party, was elected from Vermont's at-large district in the 1974 election and served for fourteen years. In the 1986 election he faced no Democratic opponent and won with 89.12% of the popular vote against three other candidates.

== Republican primary ==
=== Candidates ===
- David Gates
- Peter Plympton Smith former Lieutenant Governor of Vermont and Republican nominee for Governor in 1986

==== Declined ====
- Jim Jeffords, incumbent U.S. Representative (ran for U.S. Senate)

=== Campaign ===
Senator Robert Stafford, who had been appointed to the United States Senate in 1971, announced on April 10, 1987, that he would not seek reelection in the 1988 election. Representative Jeffords announced that he would seek the Republican nomination to succeed Stafford in the United States Senate instead of seeking reelection to the United States House of Representatives.

Dennis Delaney, a member of the Vermont Senate, considered running in a congressional, gubernatorial, or lieutenant gubernatorial election.

Smith had run in the 1986 gubernatorial election with the Republican nomination, but placed second to Democratic Governor Madeleine Kunin in the popular vote and in the Vermont General Assembly vote as no candidate had received more than 50% of the popular vote. David Dillon served as Smith's campaign manager.

Smith defeated David Gates in the primary with 77.60% of the popular vote.

=== Results ===
1988 Vermont Republican congressional primary
Party	Candidate	Votes	%
Republican	Peter Plympton Smith	37,230	77.60%
Republican	David Gates	9,964	20.77%
Write-in		784	1.63%
Total votes		47,978	100.00%

== Democratic primary ==
=== Candidates ===
- James A. Guest, former Secretary of State of Vermont and nominee for U.S. Senate in 1982
- Paul N. Poirier, Majority Leader of the Vermont House of Representatives from Barre
- Dolores Sandoval, University of Vermont professor
- Peter Welch, President pro tempore of the Vermont Senate from Windsor County

=== Campaign ===
On April 8, 1987, Paul N. Poirier, the Majority Leader of the Vermont House of Representatives, announced that he would seek the Democratic nomination for congressional election. He faced Peter Welch, the president pro tempore of the Vermont Senate, James A. Guest, the former Secretary of State of Vermont, and Dolores Sandoval, a professor at the University of Vermont.

=== Results ===
Poirier defeated Welch, Guest, and Sandoval in the primary with 33.98% of the popular vote.

1988 Vermont Democratic congressional primary
Party	Candidate	Votes	%
Democratic	Paul N. Poirier	11,024	33.98%
Democratic	Peter Welch	10,758	33.16%
Democratic	James A. Guest	8,301	25.58%
Democratic	Dolores Sandoval	2,131	6.57%
Write-in		231	0.71%
Total votes		32,445	100.00%

== Minor parties and other candidates ==
=== Bernie Sanders ===
Bernie Sanders won election as Mayor of Burlington, Vermont, in the 1981 mayoral election as an independent and won reelection in the 1983, 1985, and 1987 elections. Sanders had run for governor in the 1986 election and had received 14.45% of the popular vote in the election and support from one member of the state legislature. During the 1987 campaign Sanders stated that he would not seek reelection in 1989, stating that "eight years is enough and I think it is time for new leadership, which does exist within the coalition, to come up". Sanders announced on March 10, 1988, that he would run in the Congressional election as an independent candidate. Terry Bouricius served as Sanders' campaign treasurer. During the campaign he received the support of the Rainbow Coalition.

=== Other parties ===
Jim Hedbor announced that he would run in the election with the Libertarian nomination on February 25, 1988, at a press conference in Montpelier, Vermont. Hedbor won the Libertarian primary without opposition.

Peter Diamondstone, who had unsuccessfully ran for a seat in the United States House of Representatives five times, announced on June 3, 1988, that he would run in the election with the nomination of the Liberty Union Party. Diamondstone faced no opposition in the party's primary. Diamondstone also sought the position of Vermont Attorney General during the 1988 election. During the campaign he accused his opponents of excluding the candidates of smaller parties from debates and forums.

Morris Earle, who had unsuccessfully ran in five elections including for Vermont's at-large congressional district in 1986, announced that he would run and appeared on the Small Is Beautiful ballot line.

1988 Vermont at-large congressional district Libertarian primary
Party	Candidate	Votes	%
Libertarian	Jim Hedbor	80	84.21%
Libertarian	Write-ins	15	15.79%
Total votes		95	100.00%

1988 Vermont at-large congressional district Liberty Union primary
Party	Candidate	Votes	%
Liberty Union	Peter Diamondstone	124	92.54%
Liberty Union	Write-ins	10	7.46%
Total votes		134	100.00%

== General election ==
=== Campaign ===
Three debates was held during the campaign which were attended by all of the candidates. Two candidates forums were held with one on foreign policy and the other on elderly issues. Smith accused Poirier of conducting a negative campaign while Poirier questioned Smith's statements that he had founded and served as president of the Community College of Vermont.

A straw poll of the six candidates was conducted during one of the debates in which they were asked who they would support if they were not on the ballot. Smith and Earle stated that they would support Poirier, Sanders stated that he would support Earle, Poirier stated that he would support Sanders, and Diamondstone refused to vote.

Smith won in the general election with 41.20% of the popular vote against Sanders' 37.49% and Poirier's 18.88%. Smith won the popular vote in eight counties while Sanders won the popular vote in five counties. Smith's victory was the last time that a member of the Republican Party was elected to the United States House of Representatives from Vermont.

=== Polling ===
Poll source	Date(s)	Sample size	Margin of Error	Smith	Sanders	Poirier	Hedbor	Diamondstone	Earle	Undecided
Terry Bouricius (internal Sanders poll)	April 11–12, 1988	424 voters	± 5%	32%'	30%	7%	2%	N/A	N/A	29%
Rutland Herald; Barre Montpelier Times Argus; University of Vermont	October 6–9, 1988	502 registered voters	± 4.5%	40%'	25%	17%	0%	0%	0%	16%

=== Endorsements ===
Paul N. Poirier (D)

Organizations

- Vermont National Education Association
Bernie Sanders (I)

Organizations

- Rainbow Coalition
Peter Plympton Smith (R)

Organizations

- NRA Political Victory Fund

=== Results ===
1988 Vermont at-large congressional district election
Party	Candidate	Votes	%	±%
Republican	Peter Plympton Smith	98,937	41.20%	−47.92%
Independent	Bernie Sanders	90,026	37.49%	+37.49%
Democratic	Paul N. Poirier	45,330	18.88%	+18.88%
Libertarian	Jim Hedbor	3,110	1.30%	+1.30%
Liberty Union	Peter Diamondstone	1,455	0.61%	−3.13%
Small is Beautiful	Morris Earle	1,070	0.45%	−2.65%
Independent	Write-in	203	0.08%	−0.05%
Total votes		240,131	100.00%	

=== Results by county ===
County	Peter Plympton Smith	Votes	Bernie Sanders	Votes	Paul N. Poirier	Votes	Jim Hedbor	Votes	Peter Diamondstone	Votes	Morris Earle	Votes	Scattering	Votes	Total
	Republican		Independent		Democratic		Libertarian		Liberty Union		Small is Beautiful		Write-in		
Addison	39.53%	5,430	44.33%	6,089	12.57%	1,726	1.53%	210	0.39%	53	1.63%	224	0.02%	3	13,735
Bennington	48.33%	7,341	21.89%	3,325	26.78%	4,067	0.74%	113	1.35%	205	0.87%	132	0.03%	5	15,188
Caledonia	49.96%	5,552	35.95%	3,996	12.37%	1,375	1.01%	112	0.49%	55	1.01%	112	0.04%	5	11,114
Chittenden	38.09%	21,675	42.12%	23,968	17.61%	10,023	1.60%	908	0.39%	151	0.27%	114	0.12%	67	56,906
Essex	54.59%	1,272	23.86%	556	19.66%	458	0.47%	11	0.69%	16	0.73%	17	0.00%	0	2,330
Franklin	34.90%	5,140	39.53%	5,823	23.45%	3,454	1.61%	237	0.29%	43	0.17%	25	0.05%	7	14,729
Grand Isle	37.91%	1,094	38.57%	1,113	17.12%	494	6.03%	174	0.10%	3	0.28%	8	0.00%	0	2,886
Lamoille	42.78%	3,456	43.69%	3,529	11.09%	896	1.63%	132	0.41%	33	0.40%	32	0.00%	0	8,078
Orange	42.97%	4,776	38.20%	4,246	16.72%	1,858	1.44%	160	0.34%	38	0.30%	33	0.03%	3	11,114
Orleans	42.29%	4,026	38.90%	3,703	16.65%	1,585	1.27%	121	0.57%	54	0.27%	26	0.05%	5	9,520
Rutland	41.99%	10,838	40.35%	10,415	15.35%	3,961	1.30%	336	0.49%	127	0.42%	109	0.09%	24	25,810
Washington	38.31%	9,972	36.51%	9,503	23.44%	6,101	1.11%	289	0.34%	88	0.27%	69	0.03%	8	26,030
Windham	42.83%	7,782	28.58%	5,193	24.87%	4,519	0.51%	93	2.47%	448	0.68%	124	0.06%	11	18,170
Windsor	43.29%	10,583	35.05%	8,567	19.69%	4,813	0.87%	213	0.58%	141	0.44%	108	0.08%	19	24,444
Total	41.20%	98,937	37.49%	90,026	18.88%	45,330	1.29%	3,109	0.61%	1,455	0.47%	1,133	0.07%	157	240,147

=== Results by municipality ===
Municipality	Peter Plympton Smith	Votes	Bernie Sanders	Votes	Paul N. Poirier	Votes	Jim Hedbor	Votes	Peter Diamondstone	Votes	Morris Earle	Votes	Scattering	Votes	Total	Reference
	Republican		Independent		Democratic		Libertarian		Liberty Union		Small is Beautiful		Write-in			
Addison	56.94%	287	30.16%	152	7.14%	36	4.17%	21	0.20%	1	1.39%	7	0.00%	0	504	
Albany	42.31%	143	43.20%	146	11.24%	38	2.37%	8	0.30%	1	0.59%	2	0.00%	0	338	
