= Carina Driscoll =

American politician

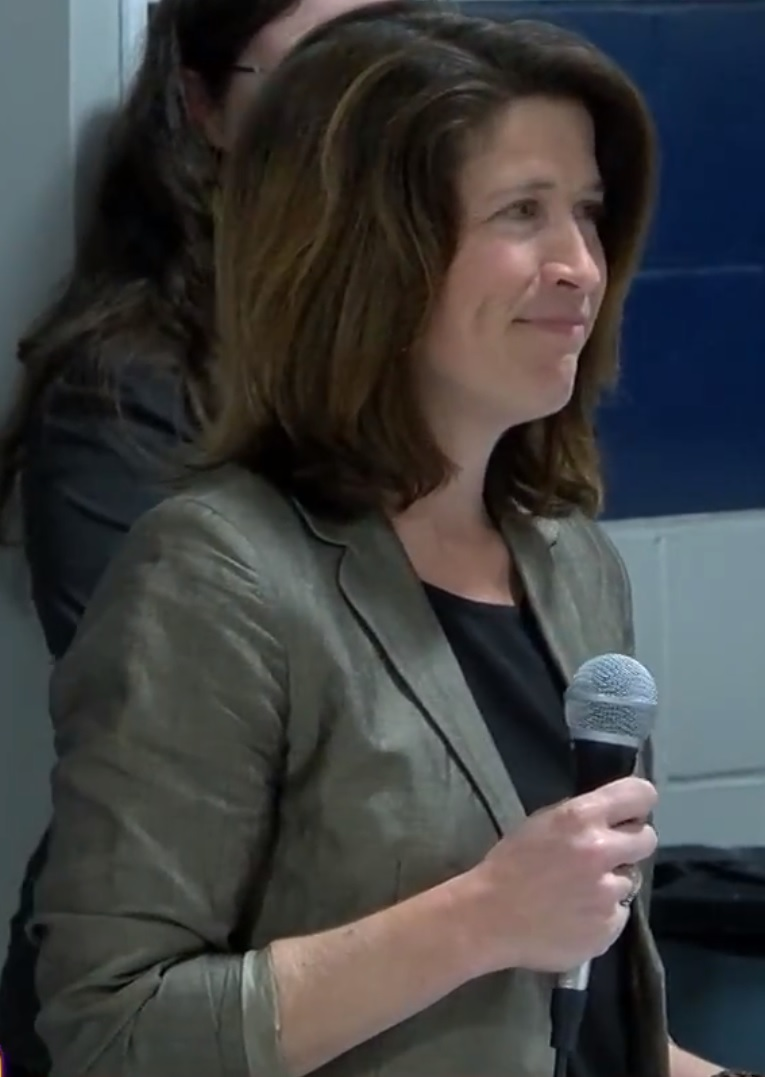
- Driscoll at the 2017 Burlington Progressive Party Caucus

Member of the Burlington, Vermont city council from the 3rd district
- In office April 7, 2003 – May 2004
- Preceded by: Doug Dunbebin
- Succeeded by: Tim Ashe

Member of the Vermont House of Representatives from the Chittenden-7-4 district
- In office 2001–2003
- Preceded by: Terry Bouricius
- Succeeded by: District eliminated

Personal details
- Born: Carina Nicole Driscoll
- Party: Vermont Progressive
- Other political affiliations: Democratic
- Spouse: Blake Anders Ewoldsen
- Children: 2
- Parent: Jane Sanders (mother)
- Relatives: Bernie Sanders (step-father); Larry Sanders (step-uncle)
- Education: University of Vermont

Carina Nicole Driscoll (born 1974) is an American politician who served in the Vermont House of Representatives from Chittenden County from 2001 to 2003, as a member of the Vermont Progressive Party. She also served on the city council in Burlington, Vermont, and unsuccessfully sought the city's mayoralty in the 2018 election.

Driscoll was educated in the Burlington School District and the University of Vermont. Her mother, Jane Sanders, married Burlington Mayor Bernie Sanders in 1988. She became active in politics during her step-father's campaigns, with her serving as Sanders' campaign, fund-raising, office, and database manager.

She entered electoral politics with her election to the Burlington school board in 2000. She was then elected to the state house, where she served one term, before winning election to a seat on the Burlington city council. She partially served one term before resigning to focus on her first child, but unsuccessfully attempted to win election to the city council in 2011. She ran against Miro Weinberger in the 2018 mayoral election, after having supported him and worked for him, but lost.

== Early life ==
Carina Nicole Driscoll was born to Jane Sanders and David Martin Driscoll. When she was 14 years-old, Driscol secured her first job at the Burlington Bagel Bakery, having been rejected on two other occasions over the belief that she was too young to work there. She graduated from Burlington School District, where she was an honors student, in 1992. She initially attended Smith College, but later transferred to the University of Montana, where she studied sociology and political science. Driscoll married Blake Anders Ewoldsen, with whom she had two children, on April 19, 2003. In 2007, she established the Vermont Woodworking School.

Her mother married Bernie Sanders, who was serving as Mayor of Burlington, Vermont, in 1988. She worked as Sanders' campaign manager during the 2000 United States House of Representatives election. She later worked as his fundraiser, office, and database manager. She earned $65,002 while working for her step-father from 2000 to 2004. She volunteered for her step-father's presidential campaign during the 2016 presidential election.

== Career ==
=== Vermont House of Representatives ===
Representative Terry Bouricius did not run for reelection to the Vermont House of Representatives from the Chittenden-7-4 district in the 2000 election. Driscoll won the nomination of the Vermont Progressive Party to run in the Chittenden-7-4 district. She defeated Grassroots nominee Matthew Hogg in the general election.

The Chittenden-7-4 district was eliminated after redistricting in 2002, and Driscoll was redistricted into a two-member district where both of the representatives were also members of the Vermont Progressive Party.

During her tenure in the state house she served on the Fish, Wildlife and Water Resources committee.

=== Local politics ===
Mary Lou Gross, a member of the Burlington School Board from the 4th district, did not seek reelection in the 2000 election. Driscoll won in the election to succeed her without opposition.

Driscoll ran for a seat on the Burlington city council from the 3rd district in the 2003 election to succeed Doug Dunbebin, who was a member of the Progressive Party. During the campaign she was endorsed by Auditor Elizabeth M. Ready, who was a member of the Democratic Party, instead of Democratic nominee Gail Compton and by Mayor Peter Clavelle. She defeated Compton and Republican nominee Kevin Ryan. She resigned from the city council in May 2004, so that she could focus on the birth on her first child. Progressive nominee Tim Ashe won in the special election to succeed her.

Driscoll participated in the Democratic caucus and supported Hinda Miller for mayor during the 2006 election, but stated that she did so because the Progressives seemed to not have a candidate. During the 2011 election Driscoll ran for the Democratic nomination for a seat on the city council from the 5th district, but was defeated by John Shannon. During the 2012 mayoral election she supported Bram Kranichfeld and later served as an adviser to Miro Weinberger as a part of his budget team. She also served as one of two assistants to Weinberger while he served as mayor.

=== Mayoral campaign ===
Driscoll, announced that she was considering running a campaign for mayor of Burlington in 2017. She announced that she would run as an independent candidate in the 2018 mayoral election on December 4, 2017. At the Vermont Progressive Party's caucus Driscoll won the party's endorsement with 116 votes against Infinite Culcleasure's 84 votes after Representative Selene Colburn nominated her for the party's endorsement. Driscoll declined to seek the endorsement of the Democratic and Republican parties. Elise Greaves served as Driscoll's campaign manager.

During the campaign Driscoll attempted to unite her and Culcleasure's campaigns stating that “I think there is a ton of overlap and shared common ground with who we want to represent and the work we want to do". She also attempted to unite the campaigns as due to Burlington's usage of first-past-the-post voting "the mayor can win on a plurality". However, Culcleasure refused to drop out of the election stating that "Being coerced to drop out of a campaign for public office has been one of the most anti-democratic adventures I have ever experienced".

Weinberger won in the general election with 48.38% of the popular vote against Driscoll's 34.96% and Culcleasure's 16.07%. During the campaign Weinberger raised over $107,000, Driscoll raised over $47,000, and Culcleasure raised over $10,000.

== Political positions ==
The state house voted seventy-eight to fifty-five, with Driscoll against, in favor of legislation requiring teenage girls to notify their parent or guardian that they are getting an abortion forty-eight hours in advance. The state house voted 72 to 69, with Driscoll against, in favor of legislation to repeal civil unions in Vermont and replace them with reciprocal partnerships. The state house voted 113 to 23, with Driscoll voting against, in favor of a resolution calling for the protection of the United States' flag. Driscoll voted against the resolution as she believed that a constitutional amendment prohibiting flag burning would weaken the First Amendment.

== Electoral history ==
2000 Vermont House of Representatives Chittenden-7-4 district election
Party	Candidate	Votes	%
Progressive	Carina Driscoll	863	76.30%
Grassroots	Matthew Hogg	268	23.70%
Total votes		1,131	100.00%

2011 Burlington, Vermont city council 5th district Democratic caucus
Party	Candidate	Votes	%
Democratic	Joan Shannon	94	61.44%
Democratic	Carina Driscoll	59	38.56%
Total votes		153	100.00%

2018 Burlington, Vermont Vermont Progressive caucus
Party	Candidate	Votes	%
Progressive	Carina Driscoll	116	58.00%
Progressive	Infinite Culcleasure	84	42.00%
Total votes		200	100.00%

2018 Burlington, Vermont mayoral election
Party	Candidate	Votes	%	±%
Democratic	Miro Weinberger (incumbent)	5,749	48.38%	−19.89%
Independent	Carina Driscoll	4,155	34.96%	+34.96%
Independent	Infinite Culcleasure	1,910	16.07%	+16.07%
Total votes		11,884	100.00%	
