= James A. Guest =

American politician (born 1940)

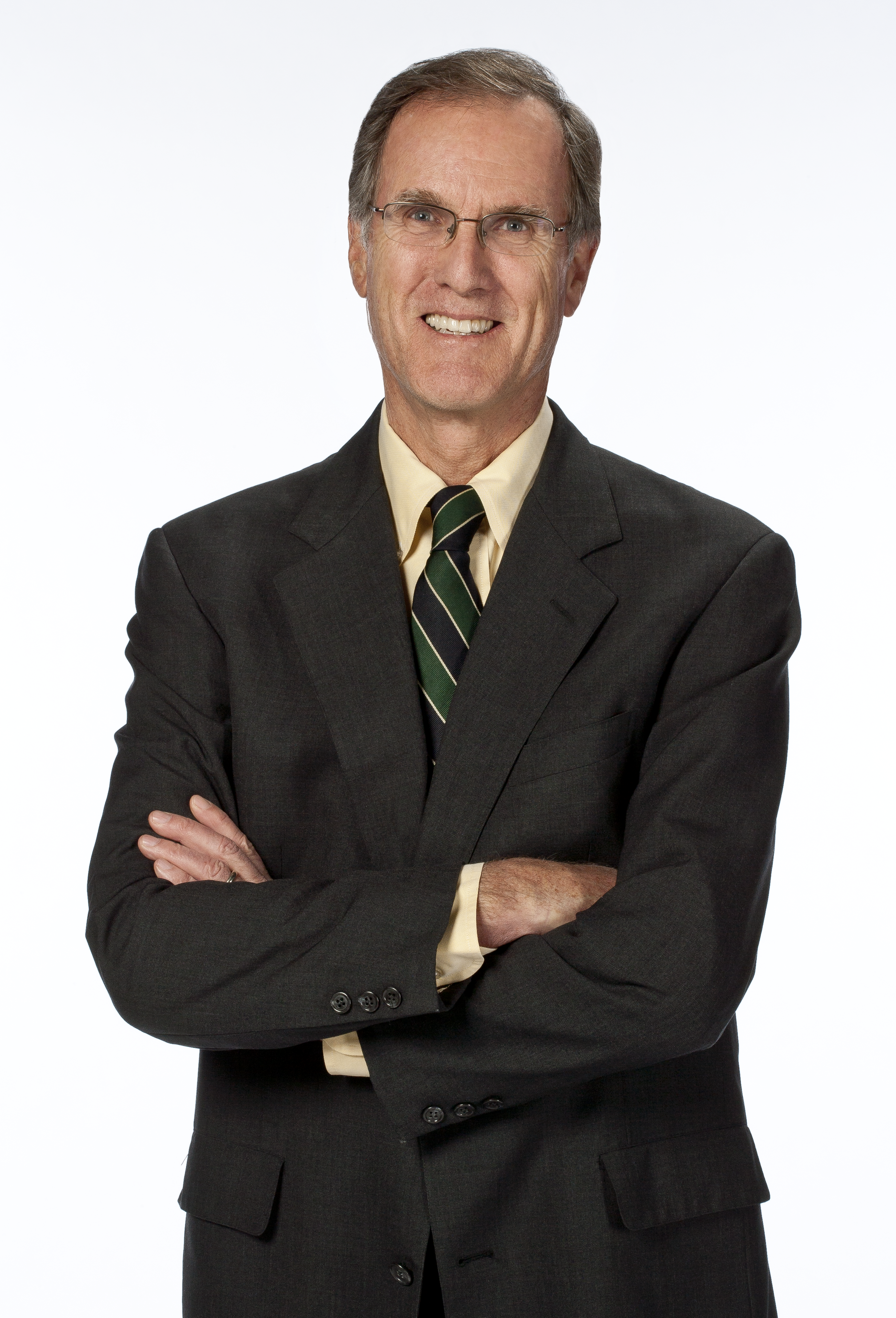
James A. Guest, 2016

James Alfred "Jim" Guest (born December 25, 1940) is an American lawyer, consumer advocate and former politician. A member of the Democratic Party, he served as the 33rd Secretary of State of Vermont from 1977 to 1981. From 2001 to 2014, Guest was the president and chief executive officer of Consumer Reports, a position he was appointed to after serving as Chairman of the Board of the Consumers Union from 1976 to 1994, with 21 of those 22 years as chair.

Guest unsuccessfully ran for the U.S. Senate in 1982 and the U.S. House of Representatives in 1988.

== Early life and education ==
James Alfred Guest was born on December 25, 1940, in Montclair, New Jersey. He graduated from Amherst College in 1962. He was a Woodrow Wilson Fellow in Economics at MIT and graduated from Harvard Law School.

== Career ==
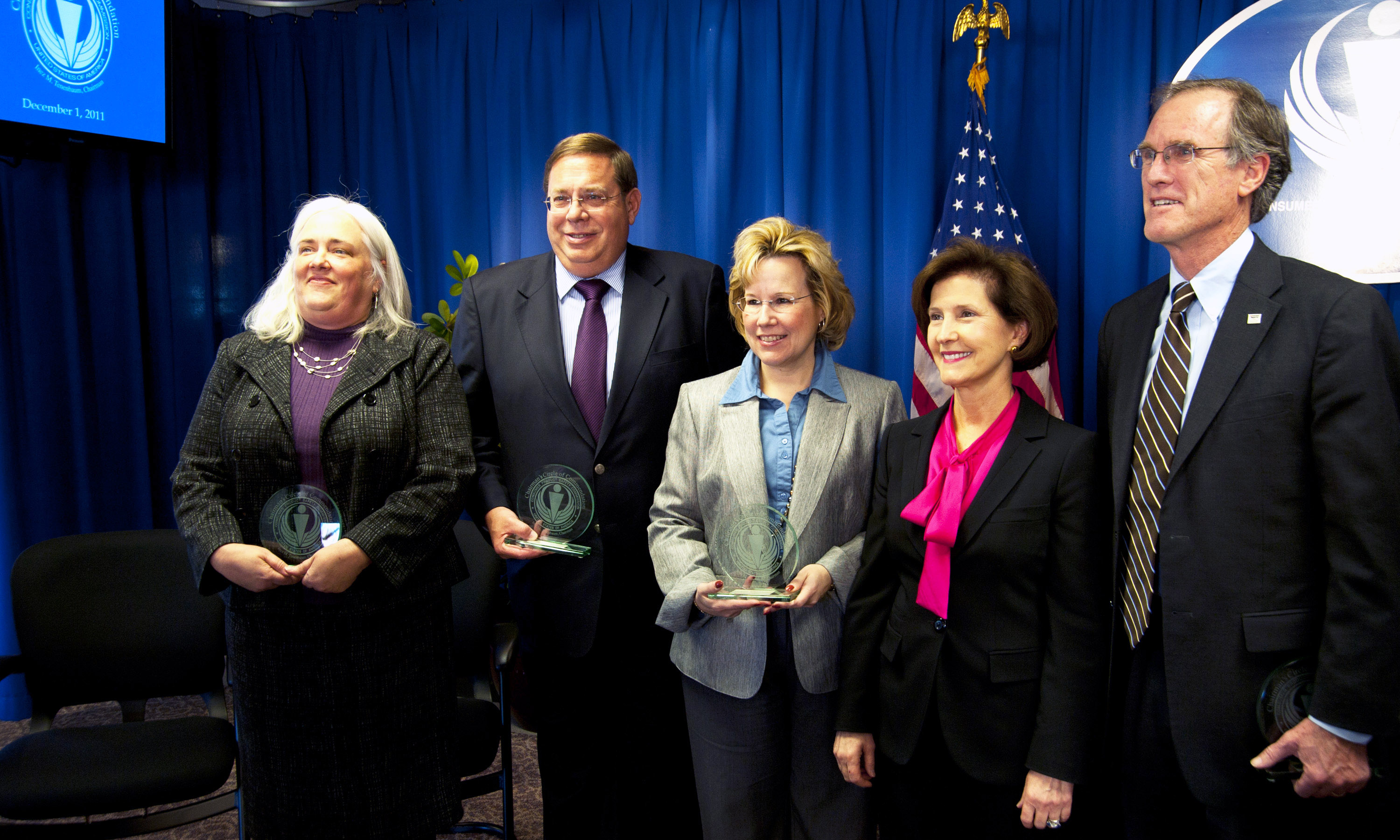
James A. Guest (far right), shown accepting an award from the Consumer Product Safety Commission in 2011.

Guest served as a legislative assistant to U.S. Senator Edward M. Kennedy of Massachusetts.

In the early 1970s, Guest moved to Vermont, where he served as State Commissioner of Banking and Insurance for three years before becoming Secretary of State of Vermont in January 1977, later becoming State Secretary of Commerce.

Guest was the Democratic nominee for the U.S. Senate in the 1982 election, in which he failed to deny incumbent Republican Senator Robert Stafford a third term in office. He unsuccessfully sought election to the U.S. House of Representatives in the 1988 election for the Vermont seat; he was part of a four-way primary race for the Democratic nomination, against State Representative Paul N. Poirier of Barre, State Senate President Peter Welch of Windsor County, and political newcomer Dolores Sandoval, a University of Vermont professor. Guest came in third place with 25% of the vote, behind winner Poirier and runner-up Welch.

From 2001 to 2014, Guest was the president and chief executive officer of Consumer Reports, a position he was appointed to after serving as Chairman of the Board of the Consumers Union from 1976 to 1994, with 21 of those 22 years as chair. In 2009, as president and CEO of the Consumer Union, Guest appeared in the 72-year-old organization's first-ever television advertisement, urging Congress to pass the Affordable Care Act. NPR described Guest as a "quietly influential figure" who was mostly unknown to Americans but exercised influence through the widely read Consumer Reports magazine and website. He ranked #11 of "the 100 most powerful people in health care" compiled by the trade publication Modern Healthcare.

Guest noted that the Consumers Union had favored health care reform since 1939, "taking the position that everybody in the country ought to have insurance coverage."

Guest has led several advocacy and other groups, including Handgun Control Inc., the Center to Prevent Handgun Violence, and Planned Parenthood of Maryland. He is also the founding executive director of the American Pain Foundation.

== Personal life ==
Guest is married to Priscilla Frances Beach; they have two children.

== Notes ==
Party political offices
Preceded by Stuart St. Peter	Democratic nominee for Secretary of State of Vermont; 1976, 1978	Succeeded by Robert S. Babcock Jr.
Preceded by Thomas P. Salmon	Democratic nominee for U.S. Senator from Vermont (Class 1); 1982	Succeeded by William B. Gray
Political offices
Preceded by Richard C. Thomas	Secretary of State of Vermont; 1977–1981	Succeeded by James H. Douglas
