= 1988 United States Senate election in Vermont =

- November 8, 1988
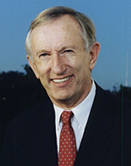

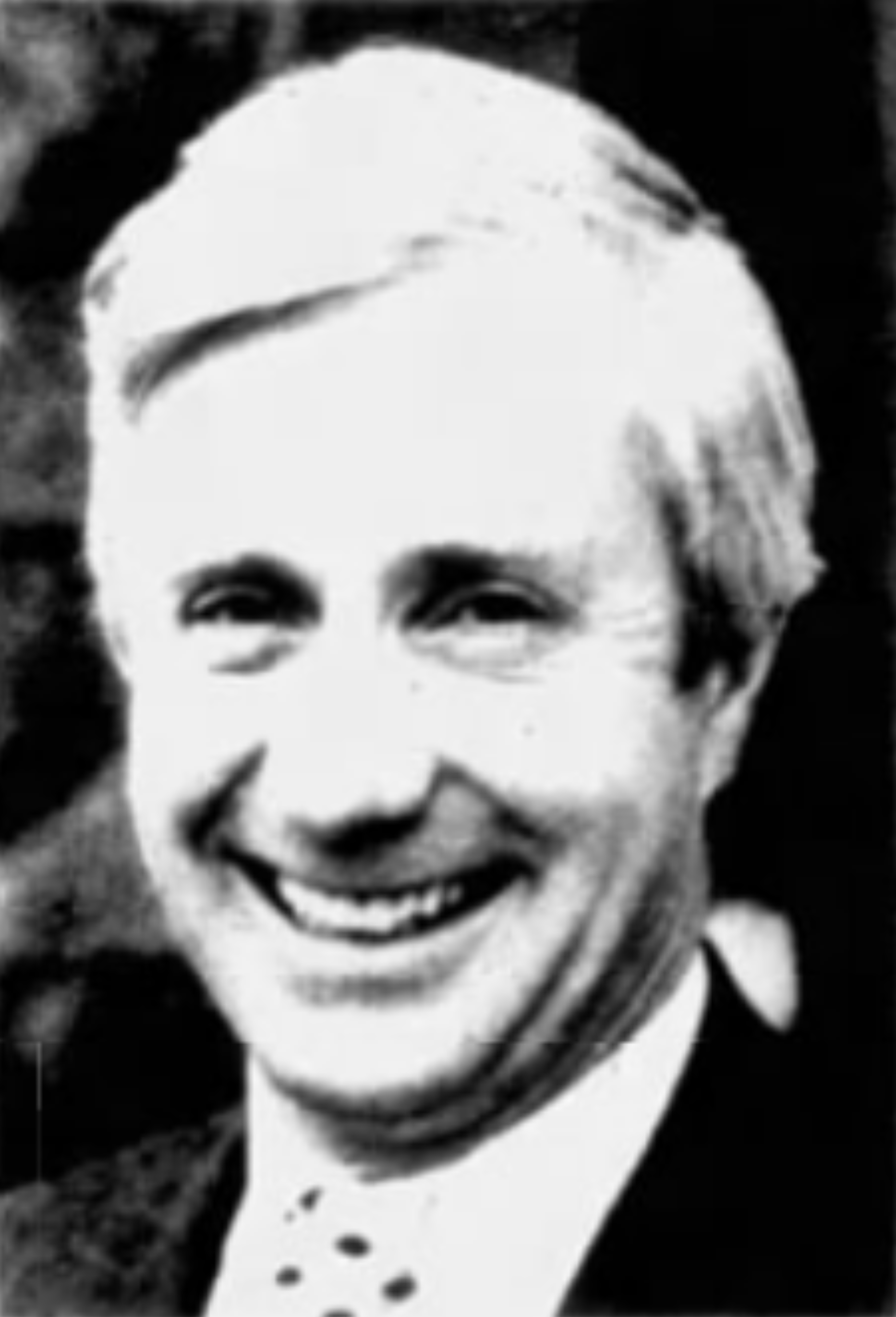
Nominee	Jim Jeffords	Bill Gray
Party	Republican	Democratic
Popular vote	163,203	71,469
Percentage	67.97%	29.76%
- Jeffords: 50–60% 60–70% 70–80% 80–90% Gray: 40–50%
U.S. senator before election
Robert Stafford
Republican
Elected U.S. Senator
Jim Jeffords
Republican

The 1988 United States Senate election in Vermont took place on November 8, 1988. Incumbent Republican Robert Stafford did not run for re-election to another term in the United States Senate. Republican candidate Jim Jeffords defeated Democratic candidate Bill Gray to succeed him.

With the results in the concurrent presidential and House elections, it is the last time that Vermont voted Republican in all three federal statewide offices simultaneously.

== Republican primary ==
=== Results ===
Republican primary results
Party	Candidate	Votes	%
Republican	Jim Jeffords	30,555	60.8
Republican	Mike Griffes	19,593	38.9
Republican	Other	128	0.3
Total votes		50,276	100.0

== Democratic primary ==
=== Results ===
Democratic primary results
Party	Candidate	Votes	%
Democratic	Bill Gray	23,138	91.5
Democratic	Other	2,149	8.5
Total votes		25,287	100.0

== General election ==
=== Candidates ===
- William B. Gray, former U.S. Attorney for the District of Vermont (Democratic)
- Jim Jeffords, U.S. Representative for Vermont at-large (Republican)
- Jerry Levy (Liberty Union)
- King Milne (Independent)

=== Polling ===
Poll source	Date(s)	Sample size	Margin of Error	Jeffords	Gray	Levy	Milne	Undecided
Rutland Herald; Barre Montpelier Times Argus; University of Vermont	October 6–9, 1988	502 registered voters	± 4.5%	63%'	19%	2%	0%	16%

=== Results ===
United States Senate election in Vermont, 1988
Party	Candidate	Votes	%
Republican	Jim Jeffords	163,203	67.97%
Democratic	Bill Gray	71,469	29.76%
Liberty Union	Jerry Levy	2,506	1.04%
Independent	King Milne	2,424	1.01%
N/A	Other	509	0.21%
Total votes		240,111	100.00%
Republican hold			

== See also ==
- 1988 United States Senate elections
- 1988 United States House of Representatives election in Vermont
- 1988 United States presidential election in Vermont
- 1988 Vermont gubernatorial election
