= Ethan Allen Institute =

American research organization

- Founder: John McClaughry
- Established: 1993
- Chair: Jack MacMullen
- Budget: Revenue: $287,000; Expenses: $368,000 (FYE December 2023)
- Address: 4836 Kirby Mountain Rd. Concord, VT 05824
- Coordinates: 44.4997°N 71.9102°W
- Interactive map of Ethan Allen Institute
- Website: www.ethanallen.org

Ethan Allen Institute (EAI), founded in 1993, is a public policy research and education organization in Vermont focused on free-market solutions. It is named after the 18th-century Vermont military leader Ethan Allen.

== Mission ==
The organization's stated mission is to "influence public policy in Vermont by helping its people to better understand and put into practice the fundamentals of a free society: individual liberty, private property, competitive free enterprise, limited government, strong local communities, personal responsibility, and expanded opportunity for human endeavor."

== History ==
EAI was founded in 1993 by John McClaughry. He served as president from 1993 to 2009, and as acting president in 2010. Currently he is EAI's vice president. Educated as a physicist and nuclear engineer, McClaughry served as a senior policy advisor in Ronald Reagan's presidential campaign of 1980, and subsequently in the White House Office of Policy Development until March 1982. He also served in the Vermont House of Representatives and Vermont State Senate. In 1992, he was the Republican candidate for Governor, ultimately losing to incumbent Democrat Howard Dean.

EAI is governed by a ten-member Board of Directors.

In 2022, Meg Hansen became president. She left in early 2023.

Myers Mermel became president in 2023. He was removed from the position by the board after serving 10 months.

On September 6, 2023, the State Policy Network suspended its affiliation with the institute.

== Activities ==
EAI sponsors policy discussions, round tables and debates; hosts an annual Jefferson Day event each April; and issues a number of publications including a monthly digital newsletter and quarterly print newsletter. Commentaries and policy analyses written by the EAI team are published by most Vermont newspapers and several broadcast outlets.

Current concerns are the state's demographic and fiscal future, economic and business climate, education, health care, energy, transportation, property rights, and constitutionalism.

In cooperation with the liberal Public Assets Institute, EAI in 2009 created a Vermont transparency web site to bring information and data about Vermont state government to interested citizens.

In 2010, EAI launched an Energy Education Project to help Vermonters understand the economics of energy choices. EAI also sponsors Common Sense Radio, a weekday talk show program that airs on WDEV.
