= John McClaughry =

American politician

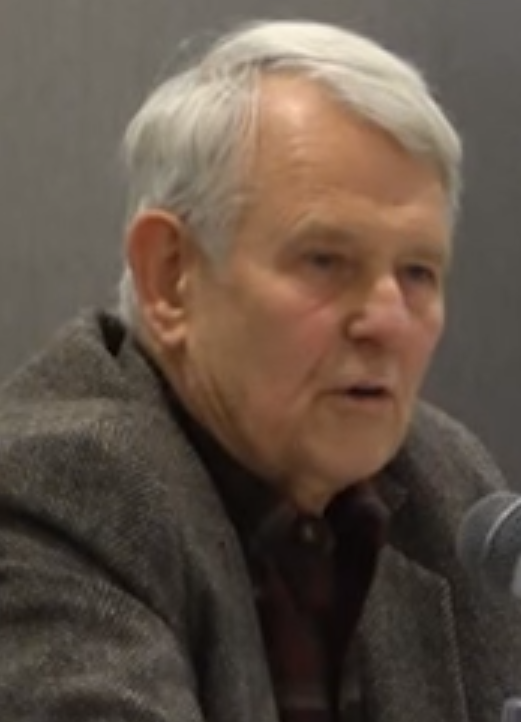

Member of the Vermont Senate from the Caledonia district
- In office 1989–1993 Serving with Joseph M. Sherman
- Preceded by: Gerald Morse
- Succeeded by: Julius D. Canns

Member of the Vermont House of Representatives from the 26th district
- In office 1969–1973 Serving with Harry U. Lawrence
- Preceded by: W. Arthur Simpson
- Succeeded by: Cola Hudson

Personal details
- Party: Republican
- Education: Miami University (AB); Columbia University (MA); University of California, Berkeley (MA)

John McClaughry (born September 15, 1937) is an American author and politician. He served in the Vermont House of Representatives from 1969 to 1972 and the Vermont State Senate from 1989 to 1992.

== Early life and education ==
McClaughry grew up in Paris, Illinois. In 1958, he earned an AB in physics and mathematics from Miami University. In 1960, he earned an MS in nuclear engineering from Columbia University. In 1963, he earned a MA in political science from University of California, Berkeley. From 1962 to 1965, McClaughry spent time living as a hobo and hopped trains, traveling in boxcars about 5,000 miles across 19 states.

== Career ==
McClaughry moved to Washington, D.C., where he worked at the moderate Republican magazine Advance. In 1968, John F. Osborne in The New Republic called McClaughry "a remarkable white Republican activist" who was working "to promote black opportunity and black control of black communities." He moved to Vermont permanently in 1970. In 1968, McClaughry was elected to a seat in the Vermont House of Representatives. He served from 1969 through 1973.

McClaughry served as a senior policy advisor in Ronald Reagan's presidential campaign of 1980. Afterwards, he served in the White House Office of Policy Development until March 1982. McClaughry ran for senate in the 1982 United States Senate election in Vermont. He placed third in the Republican primary. In 1989, McClaughry was elected to the Vermont State Senate where he served until 1992.

In 1992, he was the Republican candidate for Governor of Vermont, ultimately losing to incumbent Democrat Howard Dean. McClaughry had been the Town meeting day moderator in Kirby, Vermont, since 1967. In 1993, McClaughry founded the Ethan Allen Institute. He served as president from 1993 to 2009, and as acting president in 2010, then vice president to retirement in 2023.

== Books ==
- Expanded Ownership (Sabre Foundation, 1972)
- with Frank M. Bryan, The Vermont Papers: Recreating Democracy on a Human Scale (Chelsea Green, 1989)
- A Better Path - From Welfare to Work (Ethan Allen Institute, 1993)
- Promoting Civil Society Among the Heathen, Institute for Liberty and Community, 2013.
