= 1992 Vermont gubernatorial election =

- November 3, 1992
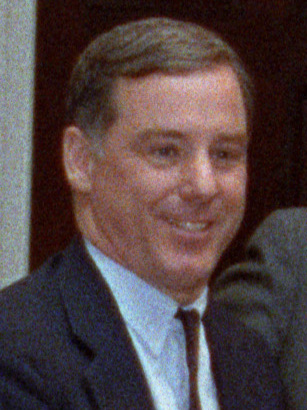

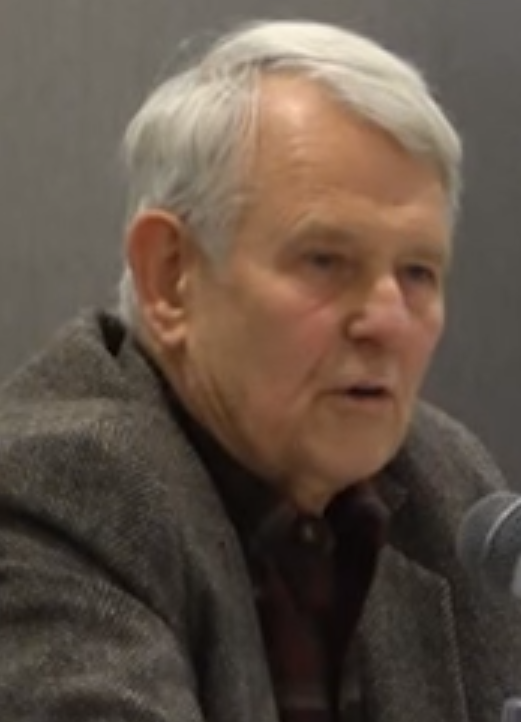
Nominee	Howard Dean	John McClaughry
Party	Democratic	Republican
Popular vote	213,523	65,837
Percentage	74.73%	23.04%
- Dean: 40–50% 50–60% 60–70% 70–80% 80–90% McClaughry: 40–50% 50–60% 60–70% 70–80%
Governor before election
Howard Dean
Democratic
Elected Governor
Howard Dean
Democratic

The 1992 Vermont gubernatorial election took place on November 3, 1992. After Republican Governor Richard Snelling died in office on August 13, 1991, Lieutenant Governor Howard Dean, a Democrat, took over for the remainder of his term. Dean ran successfully for election to a full term as Governor of Vermont, defeating Republican candidate John McClaughry. Dean's 74.7% of the vote is the best Democratic performance for governor in the history of the state.

== Democratic primary ==
=== Results ===
Democratic primary results
Party	Candidate	Votes	%	±%
Democratic	Howard Dean (incumbent)	25,504	98.5	
Democratic	Other	398	1.5	
Total votes		25,902	100.0	

== Republican primary ==
=== Results ===
Republican primary results
Party	Candidate	Votes	%	±%
Republican	John McClaughry	28,026	92.5	
Republican	Other	2,277	7.5	
Total votes		30,303	100.0	

== Liberty Union primary ==
=== Results ===
Liberty Union primary results
Party	Candidate	Votes	%	±%
Liberty Union	Richard F. Gottlieb	300	69.3	
Liberty Union	Other	133	30.7	
Total votes		433	100.0	

== General election ==
=== Results ===
1992 Vermont gubernatorial election
Party	Candidate	Votes	%	±%
Democratic	Howard Dean (incumbent)	213,523	74.73	+28.70
Republican	John McClaughry	65,837	23.04	−28.77
Liberty Union	Richard F. Gottlieb	3,120	1.09	+0.43
Natural Law	August Jaccaci	2,834	0.99	
Write-in		414	0.14	+0.05
Total votes		285,728	100.00	
