= Burlington College =

Liberal arts college in Vermont, 1972–2016

Coordinates: 44.4912°N 73.2282°W

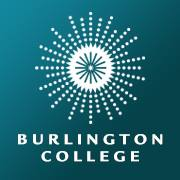
- Seal of Burlington College
- Motto: "Start a fire."
- Type: Private college
- Active: 1972; 54 years ago–May 27, 2016; 10 years ago
- Location: Burlington, Vermont, U.S.
- Campus: 32.4-acre (13.1 ha) campus in Burlington
- Website: www.burlington.edu (defunct)

Burlington College was a private college in Burlington, Vermont. It offered associate, bachelor's, and master's degrees, as well as several professional certificates. Although regionally accredited by the New England Association of Schools and Colleges, the college was placed on probation in July 2014 for failing to meet the accreditor's standards regarding financial resources. The college ceased operations in 2016.

== History ==
Burlington College started in 1972 as the Vermont Institute of Community Involvement. A handful of students met in the living room of founder Dr. Steward LaCasce. It originally served adult learners and veterans.

In 2007, the college had 204 students at its main campus in buildings in downtown Burlington. Since most were part-time, this worked out to 130 "full-time equivalents." An additional 30 students studied off-campus.

In 2010, Jane O'Meara Sanders oversaw the purchase of 33 acres (13 ha) of property to be used for college expansion, with the resulting significant debt to be covered by already pledged donations and tuition from planned increased enrollment over five years. Sanders departed shortly after, with Christine Plunkett assuming the position of president.

In 2014, the regional accreditor of the college placed it on probation because of its financial condition, and votes of no confidence were given to Plunkett from organizations representing students, faculty, and staff. She resigned shortly thereafter. In 2015, the college sold 27.5 acres (11.1 ha) of the land it had purchased a few years prior.

In May 2016, the college board of trustees decided to close the school. According to David A. Graham, writing in The Atlantic, some of the school's financial difficulties dated back to 2010 when the board of directors and Sanders purchased the property. The original $11 million of debt had been worked down to about $2 million, but because of remaining debt and "insufficient financial resources," the school's bank declined to renew their $1 million line of credit, and the school was facing the loss of their accreditation. Local Burlington developer Eric Farrell planned to purchase the campus from the bank to develop a park and housing.

=== Presidents ===
1. 1972–1994: J. Steward LaCasce
2. 1994–2002: Daniel Casey
3. 2002–2003: Mary Clancy
4. 2004–2011: Jane O'Meara Sanders
5. 2012–2014: Christine Plunkett
6. 2014: Michael Smith (interim)
7. 2014–2016: Carol A. Moore

== Campus ==
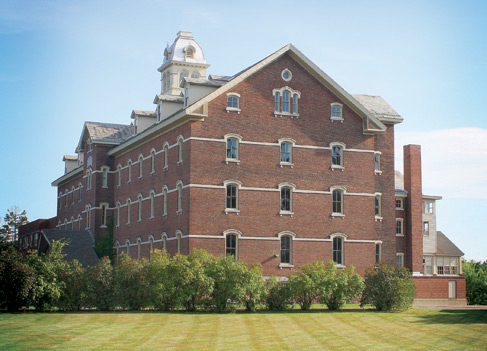
Main Campus, Burlington College

In 2011, the college sold its original campus to the Committee for Temporary Shelter, a welfare agency, and purchased 32.4 acres (13.1 ha) of waterfront property from the Roman Catholic Diocese of Burlington for use as its main campus. This new campus was located on North Avenue.

In 2015, the college sold a parcel of land, as well as the former diocesan orphanage attached to the office and classroom building, to a local developer, Farrell Real Estate. The developer drafted a master plan to convert the orphanage into student housing. The college retained the original diocese building for classrooms, studios, art rooms, film and radio, laboratories, and other facilities.

At the press conference announcing the closure, the school stated that the developer would purchase the rest of the college's campus from the bank.

== Academics ==
Burlington College offered a range of undergraduate programs in the arts, writing and literature, film studies, photography, fine arts, legal studies, transpersonal psychology/psychology, human services, media activism, and graphic design. It also provided individualized undergraduate and graduate degree programs. The college offered study-abroad options in Europe, and in 2008, Burlington College became one of the few universities in the United States to offer a study-abroad program in Havana, Cuba in conjunction with the University of Havana. Students could spend a semester at the university or participate in one of several one-week trips offered throughout the academic year. Burlington College joined several other universities in the United States by offering students the option of a narrative evaluation in addition to traditional transcripts.

In connection with the undergraduate legal studies program, Burlington College had an articulation agreement with Vermont Law School that allowed Burlington College graduates to proceed into the Juris Doctor and joint Juris Doctor programs at Vermont Law School upon successful completion of their undergraduate studies. Burlington College also had an affiliation with the Vermont Woodworking School in Fairfax. Courses in woodworking and fine craftsmanship were offered for credit to support both Associate of Arts and Bachelor of Fine Arts degree programs. In addition to woodworking skills, students took the usual general education requirements of the college. The degree could be pursued on campus, at a distance, or in combination.

Burlington College also offered a low-residency Master of Arts degree. This degree was individualized and tailored to meet the academic needs and focus of individual graduate students.

=== Rankings ===
In August 2011, The Daily Beast and Newsweek ranked Burlington College as the number one school in the United States for free-spirited students. They defined free-spirited schools as those where "there are no mandatory classes, tests, or official letter or number grades".

In October 2013, Newsweek named Burlington College as one of the 10 colleges in the United States with the highest rate of student participation in internships in their field of study.
