= Jane Sanders =

American social worker (born 1950)

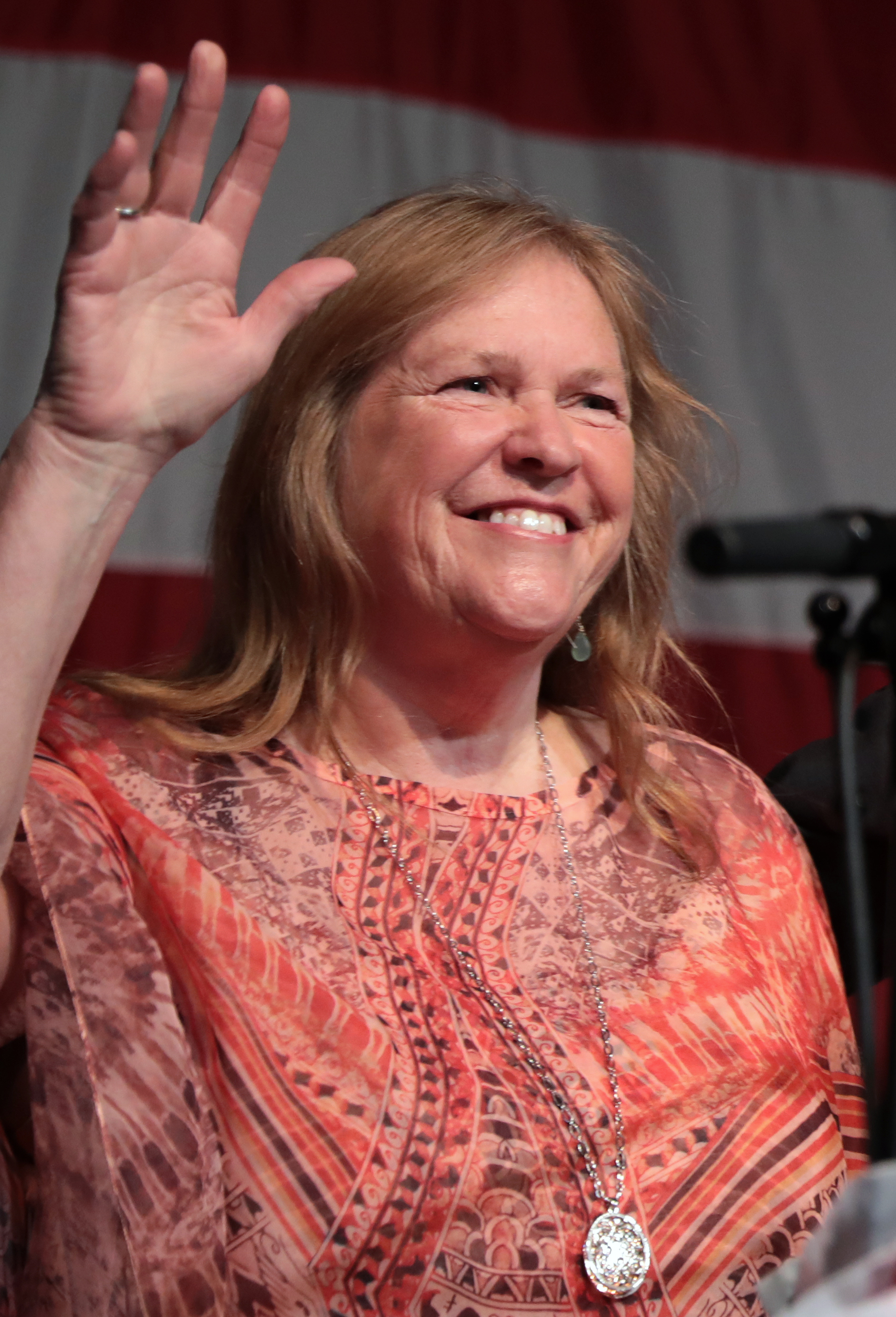
- Sanders in 2019

4th President of Burlington College
- In office March 2004 – September 2011
- Preceded by: Mary Clancy
- Succeeded by: Christine Plunkett

President of Goddard College
- In office 1996–1997
- Preceded by: Richard Greene
- Succeeded by: Barbara Mossberg

Personal details
- Born: Mary Jane O'Meara; January 3, 1950 (age 76) New York City, U.S.
- Spouses: Dave Driscoll (div. 1980) Bernie Sanders (m. 1988)
- Children: 3, including Carina
- Relatives: Larry Sanders (brother-in-law)
- Education: Goddard College (BA); Union Institute and University (MA, PhD)

Mary Jane Sanders (née O'Meara, formerly Driscoll; born January 3, 1950) is an American social worker, college administrator, activist, and political strategist. She was provost and interim president of Goddard College from 1996 to 1997 and president of Burlington College from 2004 to 2011. In 2017, Sanders founded the think tank The Sanders Institute. She has been married to U.S. Senator Bernie Sanders since 1988. She has also served as first lady of Burlington, Vermont, during her second husband's term as mayor.

== Early life, education, and personal life ==
Sanders was born Mary Jane O'Meara on January 3, 1950, and grew up in Brooklyn, New York City, as one of the five children of Bernadette Joan (Sheridan) and Benedict P. O'Meara. She is of Irish descent and was raised Catholic. O'Meara continues to observe Catholicism as of 2020. She attended Catholic schools, including Saint Saviour High School, before attending the University of Tennessee. O'Meara dropped out of school and moved back to Brooklyn with her first husband, David Driscoll. In 1975, they moved to Vermont when Driscoll's employer, IBM, transferred him. The couple divorced in 1980. She has three children: Heather Titus, Carina Driscoll, and David Driscoll from her marriage with Driscoll, who were later adopted by Sanders.

O'Meara finished her college degree at Goddard College in Plainfield, Vermont, with a bachelor's in social work. She met Bernie Sanders in 1981, ten days before his first campaign victory as Mayor of Burlington, and again at his victory party. The couple married in 1988.

In 1996, she earned a doctorate in leadership studies in politics and education from Union Institute & University headquartered in Cincinnati, Ohio.

== Career ==
Early in her career, Sanders worked in the Juvenile Division of the Burlington Police Department, then was a community organizer with the King Street Area Youth Center, and then was a volunteer with AmeriCorps VISTA.

From 1981 to 1991, Sanders served as founding director of the Mayor's Youth Office and Department Head in the City of Burlington. She was also active in K-12 education, was elected as a school board commissioner, and was a founding member of the Women's Council & the Film Commission. In 1991, her husband, Bernie Sanders, was elected to U.S. Congress. From 1991 to 1995, she worked in his office on a volunteer basis.

In 1996, Sanders was appointed provost and interim president of her alma mater, Goddard College, to help the college through a difficult period. The board, faculty, staff, students, and Sanders worked together to improve the accreditation, finances, and governance of the institution.

From 2004 through 2011, Sanders was president of Burlington College, a small liberal arts college founded in 1972 for non-traditional students. It closed due to financial problems in 2016.

As senior partner in Burlington-based consulting firm Leadership Strategies, O'Meara served as a political and educational consultant for federal, state, and local political campaigns.

Sanders was instrumental in founding the Sanders Institute, a progressive think tank that launched in June 2017, and is one of its 11 original fellows. Like the other fellows, she does not receive payment for her work, although she does receive compensation for travel expenses.

=== Adviser and aide to Bernie Sanders ===
Bernie Sanders has described his wife as "one of [his] key advisers", and he has employed her at various times as "an administrative assistant, spokeswoman, policy adviser, chief of staff, and media buyer". In a 1996 article in The Washington Post, she was credited with helping him draft "more than 50 pieces of legislation".

She has served in Sanders's Congressional office as Chief of Staff and as Policy and Press Adviser, and also serves as an Alternate Commissioner for the Texas Low Level Radioactive Waste Disposal Compact Commission.

=== Burlington College presidency ===
In 2004, Sanders was named President of Burlington College, a private, non-profit liberal arts school founded in 1972 in Vermont. She increased the small college's fundraising. During her tenure as President, Burlington had an endowment of "about $150,000", and fundraising revenue had increased from about $25,000 when Sanders first arrived to $1.25 million by 2011. In 2010, Sanders oversaw the purchase of property formerly owned and occupied by the Roman Catholic Diocese of Burlington. The College based the real estate purchase on projections that enrollment would rapidly grow from fewer than 200 to as many as 750 students, with a corresponding income increase from tuition fees.

In 2011, the College's Board of Trustees, while crediting Sanders with acquiring a permanent campus for the 200‑student college, called a meeting for September 2011 and accepted Sanders's resignation. "We reached a decision which I believe is best for both the College and me," Sanders said after the meeting, "The board and I have different visions for the future and that's perfectly fine." On departure, she received the title of President Emeritus and a $200,000 severance, consisting of one year's pay, along with certain retirement and bonus payments. With the College unable to collect on some promised pledges after Sanders had resigned, and the enrollment increase plans failing, the Diocese settled the loan debt with the College in 2015 for $996,000, less than the agreed amount, and with $1 million of the repayment made in shares of an unidentified LLC company.
