= 1982 United States Senate election in Vermont =

- November 2, 1982
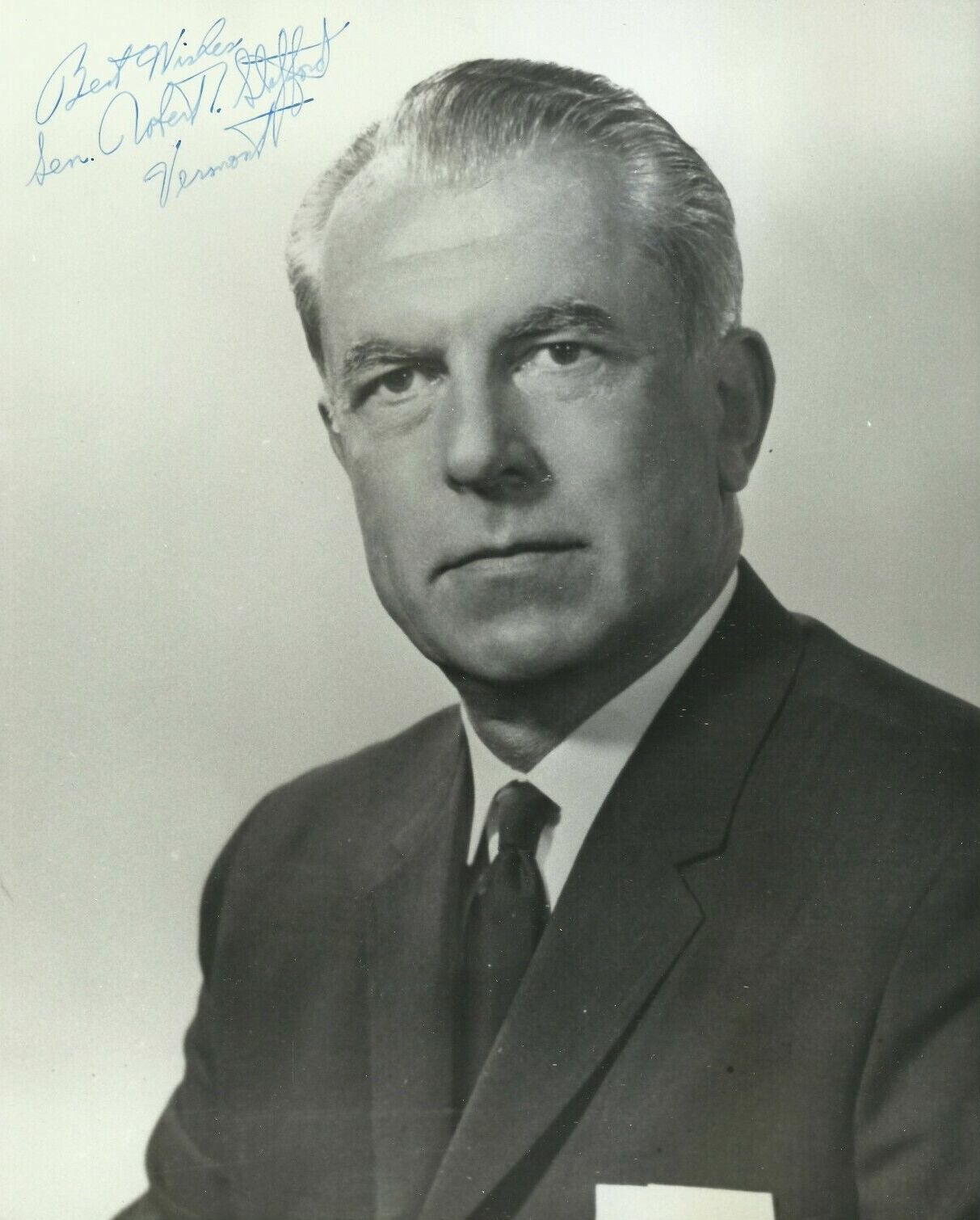

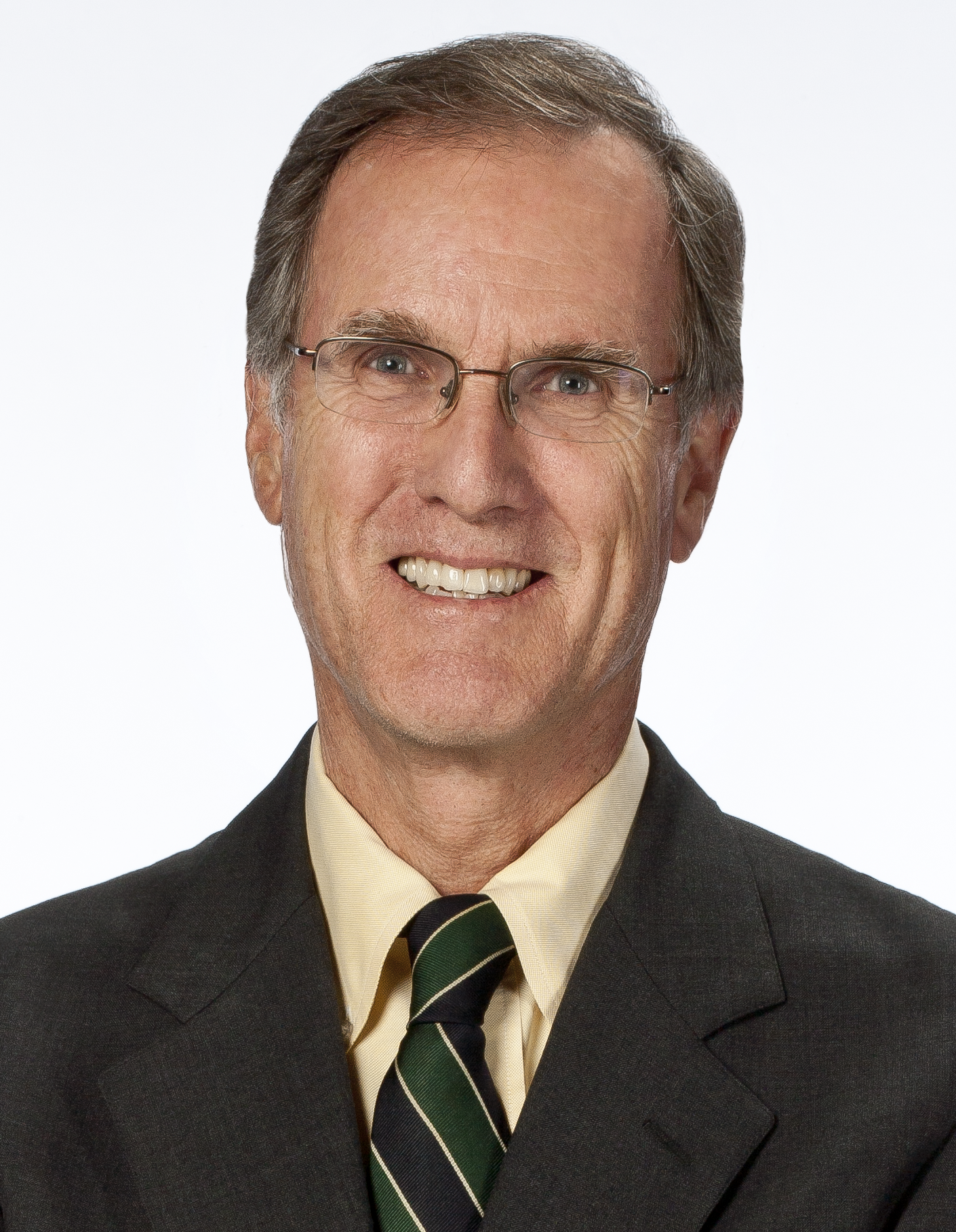
Nominee	Robert Stafford	James A. Guest
Party	Republican	Democratic
Popular vote	84,450	79,340
Percentage	50.27%	47.23%
- Stafford: 30–40% 40–50% 50–60% 60–70% 70–80% 80–90% Guest: 40–50% 50–60% 60–70%
U.S. senator before election
Robert Stafford
Republican
Elected U.S. Senator
Robert Stafford
Republican

The 1982 United States Senate election in Vermont took place on November 2, 1982. Incumbent Republican Senator Robert Stafford successfully ran for re-election to a third term in office, defeating Democratic candidate and former Vermont Secretary of State James A. Guest.

This election marks the last time a Democrat won any counties in a race for Vermont's Class 1 U.S. Senate seat, as well as the last time the winner of the seat did not win every county in the state until 2024.

== Republican primary ==
=== Candidates ===
- Stewart M. Ledbetter, former Vermont banking and insurance commissioner and nominee for Senate in 1980
- John McClaughry, staffer in the White House Office of Policy Development and former state representative from Caledonia County
- Robert Stafford, incumbent U.S. senator

=== Results ===
Republican primary results
Party	Candidate	Votes	%
Republican	Robert Stafford (incumbent)	26,323	46.2%
Republican	Stewart M. Ledbetter	19,743	34.7%
Republican	John McClaughry	10,692	18.8%
Write-in		162	0.3%
Total votes		65,920	100.00

== Democratic primary ==
=== Results ===
Democratic primary results
Party	Candidate	Votes	%
Democratic	James A. Guest	11,352	67.1
Democratic	Thomas E. McGregor	3,749	22.2
Democratic	Earl S. Gardner	1,281	7.6
Democratic	Other	536	3.2
Total votes		16,918	100

== General election ==
=== Results ===
United States Senate election in Vermont, 1982
Party	Candidate	Votes	%
Republican	Robert Stafford (incumbent)	84,450	50.27%
Democratic	James A. Guest	79,340	47.23%
Independent	Michael Edward Hackett	1,463	0.87%
Independent	Ion Laskaris	897	0.53%
Libertarian	Bo Adlerbert	892	0.53%
N/A	Other	961	0.57%
Total votes		168,003	100.00%

== See also ==
- 1982 United States Senate elections
