= Paul N. Poirier =

American politician (born 1948)

Paul N. Poirier (born September 30, 1948) is an American politician from Vermont who served several terms in the Vermont House of Representatives.

== Early life and start of career ==
Poirier was born in Lewiston, Maine on September 30, 1948. He was educated at private schools in Maine and Norwich University, where he received a Bachelor of Science degree in 1970 and a Master of Education degree in history and government in 1973. Poirier was also a member of the Norwich ice hockey team, and was one of the school's all-time top 10 leading scorers.

After college, Poirier became a social studies and physical education teacher at Spaulding High School in Barre. In addition, he was the coach of the varsity ice hockey team, which won the 1980 Division 1 state championship, Spaulding's first title in nearly 20 years.

== Vermont House of Representatives ==
Originally a Democrat, in 1980 Poirier was a successful candidate for election to the Vermont House of Representatives, defeating 15-year incumbent Republican Lucille Molinaroli. He was reelected in 1982, 1984, and 1986, and served from January 1981 to January 1989. During his House tenure, Poirier became assistant minority leader and worked with Ralph G. Wright, the Speaker of the House, to build a Democratic majority. (Wright had become Speaker with the support of Democrats and a small number of Republicans.) When Democrats attained the majority in 1987, Poirier became majority leader, and served until 1989. His House career also included service as vice chair of the Rules Committee, member of the Joint Rules Committee, and chairman of Select House Committee on Economic Growth.

== U.S. House of Representatives campaign ==
In 1988 Poirier was a candidate for Vermont's lone seat in the United States House of Representatives, which was being vacated by Jim Jeffords, who was a candidate for the U.S. Senate seat of the retiring Robert Stafford. Poirier won the Democratic nomination in a close contest over Peter Welch and James A. Guest. The general election was a three-way contest between Poirier, Republican candidate Peter Smith, and Independent Bernie Sanders. Smith won with a plurality, taking 41.2 percent of the vote to 37.5 for Sanders and 18.9 for Poirier. Sanders' strong showing proved a harbinger; in 1990, he ran again, and defeated Smith 56 percent to 39.5.

== Continued career ==
After his House campaign, Poirier continued his career as the manager of Community Relations for the Green Mountain Power company, a position he accepted while still serving in the Vermont House, and later worked for Vermont Protection and Advocacy as the public advocate for patients at the Vermont State Hospital and inmates at the Chittenden Correctional Facility. In 1990 he won election to the Barre City Council, a nonpartisan position, and he served until 1999. Also in 1990, Poirier ran unsuccessfully for a seat in the Vermont State Senate.

From 1991 to 1997 he was a member of the Environmental Commission for District 5, which includes Barre City. In 1994, he was again an unsuccessful candidate for the Vermont State Senate. Poirier returned to the Vermont House after winning election in 1996, and he served two terms, January 1997 to January 2001. During his second House tenure, he was chairman of the House Health and Welfare Committee, a member of the Health Oversight Committee, and chairman of the House Select Committee on Health Care Reform. In 2000, he was again an unsuccessful candidate for the Vermont Senate.

== Later career ==
In 2006, Poirier was again elected to the Vermont House of Representatives. He was reelected in 2008, 2010, 2012, 2014, and 2016, and served from January 2007 to January 2019. During his third period of service in the House, Poirier was a member of the Committee on Health Care, and he changed his political affiliation from Democratic to Independent. In explaining his decision to leave the Democratic Party, Poirier indicated he could better work on issues of importance to him, including topics related to social justice and labor, if he did not feel compelled to vote a certain way because a party leader requested it.

Poirier was again elected to the Barre City Council in 2008, and also became a member of the board of trustees for the Aldrich Public Library. In December 2016, he resigned from the city council, citing health concerns and a desire to concentrate on his work in the Vermont House.

In 2018, Poirier was defeated for reelection in his two-member district, with the two Democratic nominees, incumbent Tommy Walz and former Barre Mayor Peter Anthony finishing ahead of him. During the campaign, Poirier made headlines for confronting city council member Brandon Batham at a council meeting. Batham, a staff member for the Vermont Democratic Party, endorsed Poirier's opponents in an online post that identified Batham as a city council member. In addition to objecting to what he said were Batham's misrepresentations of his record, Poirier criticized Batham for identifying himself as a council member, since municipal offices in Barre are officially nonpartisan.

In addition to his Vermont House and city council service, Poirier served as president of the Green Mountain United Way and executive director of the Turning Point Center of Central Vermont, a substance abuse recovery facility.

== Family ==
Poirier is married to Lesley (McLeod) Poirier, and they are the parents of two grown children, Aimee and Jeffrey.
