= Citizens Party (United States) =

1980s political party in the US

- Founded: November 2, 1979
- Dissolved: ~1990
- Preceded by: People's Party
- Succeeded by: New Party; Progressive Dane; Progressive State Parties (Washington, Oregon, Minnesota, Vermont)
- Ideology: Environmentalism; Progressivism; Green politics Social justice Left-libertarianism
- Political position: Left-wing
- Colors: Green

The Citizens Party was a political party in the United States. It was founded in Washington, D.C., by Barry Commoner, who aimed to create a nationwide political coalition of progressive, environmentalist and liberal groups, many of which were unsatisfied with President Jimmy Carter's administration, for the first time since the dissolution of the national Progressive Party in the 1960s. The Citizens Party registered with the Federal Election Commission at the end of 1979. Commoner, a professor of environmental science at Washington University in St. Louis, was the head of the Center for the Biology of Natural Systems in St. Louis, Missouri and editor of Science Illustrated magazine.

The Citizens Party was a progressive, pro-science, and environmentalist party that advocated for stronger union rights, a national health service, and the expansion of cooperatives.

== History ==
=== 1980 election cycle ===
The first Citizens Party National Convention met in Cleveland, Ohio, in the Cleveland Plaza Hotel from April 10 to 13, 1980. There were 260 delegates from 30 states present. The "proposals presented at the convention reportedly numbered some 300 items, a list largely irreducible to a manageable platform ... Units of the party organization on the state level thus became more or less responsible for delineating their own briefer versions of the list of goals" (Kruschke, p. 46). The party nominated Barry Commoner and LaDonna Harris (then, at that time, the wife of Democratic senator Fred Harris of Oklahoma) for president and vice president respectively. La Donna Harris was "a leading feminist and a Comanche Indian [who] labeled herself as 'a woman of color.'"

In order to increase public awareness of its existence, the Citizens Party ran a commercial on 600 radio stations which used profanity (the advertisement began with an actor exclaiming: "Bullshit! ... Carter, Reagan and Anderson, it's all bullshit!"). Several of the radio stations tried to remove the profanity, but the Federal Communications Commission forbade them to do so.

As the party's presidential candidate in 1980, Commoner achieved ballot status in 29 states (22 and DC under the Citizens Party label, six as an Independent, and in Pennsylvania with the Consumer Party), although his major activity was centered in the large states of California, Illinois, Michigan, New York, and Pennsylvania.

In addition to the national ticket in the presidential election, twenty-two other Citizens candidates appeared on the ballot in various states, including three for the U.S. Senate and eleven for the U.S. House. Commoner received 221,083 votes. Although Commoner did not garner more than one percent in any state, the party received enough support to be the first minor party to qualify for federal matching funds (about $157,000) for the 1984 elections.

=== 1982 election cycle ===
In 1981, the Citizens Party won an election for the first time when Terry Bouricius was elected to the board of Aldermen in Burlington, Vermont. In 1982, the Citizens Party fielded two candidates for governorships (Pennsylvania and Texas), three candidates for the Senate (Pennsylvania, Texas, and Vermont), and 15 candidates for the U.S. House.

=== 1984 election cycle ===
In 1984, the Citizens Party held its second national convention at Hamline University in St. Paul, Minnesota, from August 10 to 12, 1984. There were 125 delegates from 30 states present. The convention nominated Sonia Johnson of Virginia, “a radical feminist,” for president and Richard Walton of Rhode Island for vice president. Johnson had been excommunicated from the LDS Church in 1979 as a result of her outspoken support of the Equal Rights Amendment. In 1982 Johnson undertook a publicized 37-day fast which was meant to encourage the Illinois legislature to ratify the ERA.

Two other minor parties endorsed the Citizens ticket in 1984. The Socialist Party USA National Convention in New York City from September 3 to 5, 1983 voted to try to run a joint ticket with the Citizens Party, and the Peace and Freedom Party in California endorsed Johnson for president (although it ran Emma Wong Mar for vice president).

Despite the two additional endorsements, the Citizens Party suffered serious setbacks during 1984. It ran fewer candidates for office: one for the Senate (Illinois), one for Governor (Vermont), and two for the U.S. House. Johnson appeared on the ballot in thirteen states as the Citizens candidate, two as an Independent, one (Arkansas) as the Citizens Group nominee, and one (Pennsylvania) as the Consumer nominee. The Citizens Party vote fell by two thirds, to 72,153, although Johnson significantly improved upon Commoner's totals in Pennsylvania and Louisiana.

=== 1986 election cycle and party dissolution ===
In the 1986 election, the Citizens Party once again offered four candidates: two for governor (Pennsylvania and Rhode Island), one for the Senate (Pennsylvania), and one for the U.S. House (Minnesota). The Pennsylvania candidates used the Consumer Party label.

After the disappointing number of votes cast in favor of the Citizens Party nominees, it dissolved. The 1987 Socialist Party USA National Convention nominated its own ticket of Willa Kenoyer (a former co-chair of the Citizens Party) and Ron Ehrenreich for the 1988 presidential election, while the Consumer Party in Pennsylvania resumed its separate existence, picking up the remaining pieces of the Citizens Party.

=== Presidential election summary ===
| Year | Presidential candidate | Vice presidential candidate | Popular votes | % | Electoral votes | Result | Ballot access | Notes | Ref |
|---|---|---|---|---|---|---|---|---|---|
| 1980 | Barry Commoner | LaDonna Harris | 234,294 | 0.27% | 0 | Lost | 26 / 51 | Wretha Hanson was the candidate for vice-president in Ohio | |
| 1984 | Sonia Johnson | Richard Walton | 72,161 | 0.08% | 0 | Lost | 19 / 51 | also endorsed by the Socialist Party USA (SPUSA) | |

== See also ==
- 1980 United States presidential election
- 1984 United States presidential election
- Citizens Party of the United States (2011–present)
