= Gordon Paquette =

American politician (1916–1995)

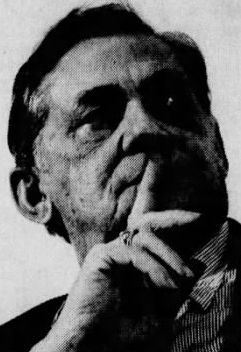

36th Mayor of Burlington
- In office April 5, 1971 – April 6, 1981
- Preceded by: Francis J. Cain
- Succeeded by: Bernie Sanders

Personal details
- Born: November 25, 1916 Burlington, Vermont, U.S.
- Died: March 15, 1995 (aged 78) Burlington, Vermont, U.S.
- Party: Democratic
- Spouse: Mary Hallihan
- Children: 5

Gordon H. Paquette (November 25, 1916 – March 15, 1995) was an American politician who served as the 36th Mayor of Burlington, Vermont from 1971 to 1981, when he was defeated by future United States Senator and presidential candidate Bernie Sanders in the latter's first electoral victory.

== Early life ==
Gordon Paquette was born in Burlington, Vermont, on November 25, 1916. He married Mary Hallihan, with whom he had five children, on February 19, 1945.

Paquette worked at a grocery store at age 11. He heard that the owner was going to sell the store and convinced his father to buy it so that he could maintain his job. Paquette worked for Girard Baking and rose from a truck driver to manager. Fassett's Bakery acquired Girard Baking in 1968, and Paquette remained in the company as an executive until 1975.

== Early political career ==
In 1958, Paquette was elected as an alderman from Burlington's Second Ward after defeating four-term incumbent Gordon Perkins. During the 1968 presidential election, Paquette supported Hubert Humphrey after Lyndon B. Johnson had dropped out following the New Hampshire primary and supported giving Humphrey the majority of Burlington's 82 delegates at the state's Democratic nominating convention.

In 1971, Paquette defeated Frank Dion and was elected mayor and would not face any significant opposition for another decade. In 1972 Paquette spent two days lobbying Representatives and Senators to vote to approve federal revenue sharing which was successful. Following the defeat of a proposal to increase a tax rate by 48 cents in 1976, Paquette and the Finance Board extended a hiring freeze. The city's budget was under threat of not being funded after the federal government reduced its revenue sharing to Burlington by $700,000 despite calls to increase it to $1.3 million.

Paquette declined to run for the Democratic nomination in the 1978 gubernatorial election.

== 1981 mayoral campaign ==
In 1981, incumbent Democratic Party mayor Gordon Paquette decided to run for re-election to a fifth term with his main opposition being independent socialist activist Bernie Sanders, who had run for senator and governor twice before (losing all four elections), and businessman Richard Bove. Both challengers were independents, as the Republican party saw Paquette as unobjectionable to them and chose to not run a candidate. Paquette's popularity declined due to his support of a 65 cent tax increase and opposition to a ballot vote on a fair housing committee. In a four-way race, Paquette lost to Sanders by twenty-two votes and a recount was ordered, after which the margin shrank to ten votes. Before 1981, Paquette had never lost a city election and had never lost a single ward while running for mayor. Following his defeat, he announced that he would only govern as an acting mayor and would only take action when it was demanded.

== Later life ==
Paquette died on March 15, 1995, after a short illness in the Medical Center Hospital of Vermont.
