= Judy Stephany =

American politician

Judith Stephany
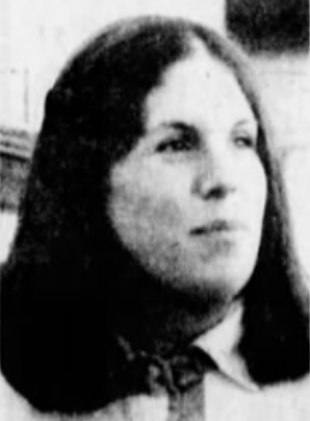
- Stephany in 1983

Member of the Vermont House of Representatives
- In office January 6, 1977 – January 30, 1983
- Governor: Richard A. Snelling
- Preceded by: James Fitzpatrick
- Succeeded by: Robert MacLellan
- Constituency: Chittenden 4-6 District

Member of the Vermont State Senate
- In office December 29, 1993 – January 17, 1995
- Governor: Howard Dean
- Preceded by: Edwin Granai
- Constituency: Chittenden Senate District

Personal details
- Born: Judith B. Stephany; May 31, 1944 (age 82)
- Party: Democratic

Judith B. Stephany Ahearn (born May 31, 1944) is an American politician who served as a member of the Vermont State Senate and the Vermont House of Representatives, and was the Democratic nominee for Mayor of Burlington in 1983, losing to independent Bernie Sanders.

== Political career ==
=== Vermont State House ===
Prior to her election to the state house Stephany served as Vice Chairwoman of the Ward 4 Democratic Committee in Burlington, Vermont. Stephany was first elected to the Vermont House of Representatives in 1976 for the Chittenden 4-6 district, taking the seat being vacated by the retiring James Fitzpatrick. She was elected Minority Leader unanimously by the Democrats in 1980, urging party unity in the face of the collapse of the bipartisan consensus surrounding Democrat Timothy J. O'Connor's position of Speaker of the Vermont House of Representatives, with Republicans taking back control of the speakership after O'Connor had retired that election cycle.

=== Burlington mayoral campaign ===
In 1981, the longtime Democratic Mayor of Burlington, Gordon Paquette, lost in an upset to independent socialist Bernie Sanders. Over the following two years Sanders and Burlington Democrats had poor relations with each other, and the party was eager to take back the mayoralty at the time of the next election in 1983. However, the Democrats faced difficulties finding a strong candidate, with several state senators and local officials refusing to run. An hour before the deadline for nominations closed Stephany announced her intent to run, after being promised $30,000 in fundraising support by the Burlington Democratic Party. She won the nomination by a margin of 3-to-1 over gas station owner William H. Williams.

Stephany initially announced her intent to remain as Minority Leader of the Vermont House while campaigning for mayor, stating that she would turn over day-to-day duties to Assistant Minority Leader Paul N. Poirier. However only a few days after winning the nomination she changed tack, announcing that she would step down from her position as Minority Leader and resign her seat in the Vermont House. Oral surgeon Robert MacLellan was appointed as her replacement.

Stephany attempted to distance herself from the mayoralty of the unpopular Paquette, aiming to project an image of "fresh liberalism". Her campaign stressed the view that Sanders was an ineffective mayor due to his disputes with the Burlington City Council, and she attempted to portray herself as the middle ground between the "anti-business" stance of Sanders and the "pro-business" stance of Republican James Gilson, who was also running for mayor.

Stephany lost the election, receiving 30% of the vote to Sanders' 52% and Gilson's 17%. This result was viewed as being "not close" according to The New York Times.

=== Executive roles ===
Following her defeat in the mayoral race, Stephany became a sex equity consultant for the Vermont Department of Education. In 1986 she was appointed by Governor of Vermont Madeleine Kunin as one of her aides, and was given the task of managing Kunin's relations with the Vermont legislature. Stephany was appointed to the role as a result of her good relations with the legislature, which was reflected in her appointment being praised by both Democratic and Republican officials. She served in this role until 1991.

=== Vermont State Senate ===
On December 29, 1993, Stephany was appointed by Governor of Vermont Howard Dean to the Vermont State Senate in order to fill a vacancy left by the retirement of incumbent Edwin Granai, representing Chittenden County. She beat out two other candidates for the appointment; attorney David Curtis and radio host Jack Barry. Stephany expressed a particular desire to work on issues of domestic violence, and also expressed opposition to the single-payer healthcare plan being advocated her by her old mayoral rival Bernie Sanders, denouncing such a plan as impractical. Stephany ran for a full state senate term in 1994 but lost re-election, with Republicans winning four of the six Chittenden County State Senate seats and the two Democratic slots being taken by Jack Barry and incumbent Jean Ankeney.

== Political positions ==
Stephany was generally regarded as a liberal Democrat, but one notable exception was her position on abortion, which she was opposed to. This belief meant that Stephany's relations with feminists were often strained.
