= Hilton Wick =

American politician

Hilton Addison Wick

Vermont State Senator
- In office 1989–1991

Personal details
- Born: February 11, 1920 Mt. Pleasant, Pennsylvania, United States
- Died: March 17, 2006 (aged 86) Burlington, Vermont
- Party: Republican
- Spouse(s): Barbara Shaw, a multigenerational native to Stowe, Vermont
- Relations: Wick family
- Children: 5
- Education: Harvard Law School

Hilton Addison Wick (February 11, 1920 – March 17, 2006) was an American politician and Vermont Senator.

== Life ==
Hilton Addison Wick was raised in Mt. Pleasant, Pennsylvania. After serving in World War II, he graduated from Maryville College and Harvard Law School, and in 1949 he moved to Vermont with his wife Barbara Shaw. He practiced law and became the President of the Chittenden Trust Co. He was a Trustee of Middlebury College from 1969 to 1984. His role as a community leader and charitable fundraiser helped to launch his political career.

In 1984, he opposed Vermont Attorney General John Easton, Jr. for the Republican nomination in the 1984 Vermont gubernatorial election, but lost the nomination to Easton. In 1988 he was elected a Senator for the Chittenden district, and served from 1989 until 1991. He then resumed his law practice with his sons until his death in 2006.

== Ancestry ==
He was a distant cousin of the Revolutionary War heroine Temperance Wick and the United States Congressman William W. Wick. In Vermont his name became proverbial for charitable fundraising, and the Hilton Wick Award, which is an annual award honoring persons who have engaged in charitable activities, is named after him.

== Wick House ==
In 2014, the Wick House in Burlington, which was originally built in 1820, was moved several hundred feet from its original site. Hilton Wick was the last member of the Wick family to own the house.
