= List of Pulitzer Prizes awarded to The Buffalo News =

Since the year of 1958, The Buffalo News, previously known as Buffalo Evening News, has won 4 Pulitzer Prizes. It is a prize awarded for excellence in journalism. Buffalo News journalists have won the Pulitzer Prize for Editorial Cartooning three times.

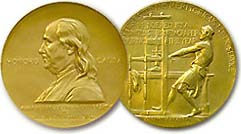
Pulitzer Prize award

== 1950s ==
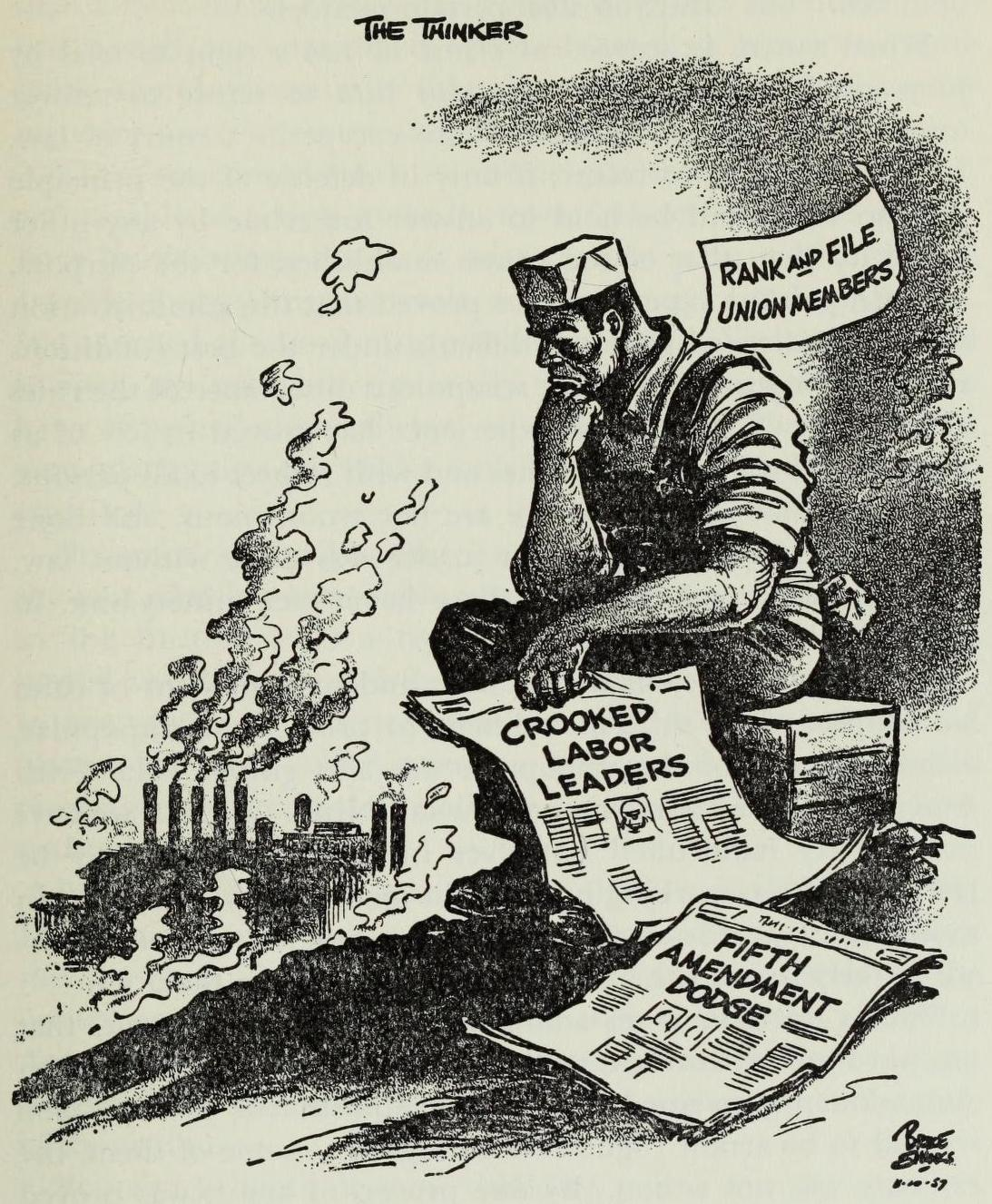
"The Thinker", winner of the 1958 prize for editorial cartooning

- 1958: Bruce Shanks won the Pulitzer Prize for Editorial Cartooning for "'The Thinker' that was published on August 10, 1957. It depicted the dilemma of union membership when it is confronted by racketeering leaders in some labor unions."

== 1960s ==
- 1960: Edgar May won the Pulitzer Prize for Investigative Reporting for his series, "Our Costly Dilemma," concerning the need for reform of New York State's welfare system. The series touched off debates about welfare reform nationwide.

== 1990s ==
- 1990: Tom Toles won the Pulitzer Prize for Editorial Cartooning for "his work during the year as exemplified by the cartoon 'First Amendment.'"

== 2010s ==
- 2015: Adam Zyglis won the Pulitzer Prize for Editorial Cartooning for using, in the committee's citation, "strong images to connect with readers while conveying layers of meaning in few words.
