= Kimberly B. Cheney =

American lawyer

21st Attorney General of Vermont
- In office 1973–1975
- Governor: Thomas P. Salmon
- Preceded by: Jim Jeffords
- Succeeded by: M. Jerome Diamond

Personal details
- Born: November 25, 1935 (age 90) Manchester, Connecticut, U.S.
- Party: Republican (1967-1975), Democratic (1975-present)
- Education: Yale University; University of Connecticut
- Profession: Attorney

Kimberly B. Cheney (born November 25, 1935, Manchester, Connecticut) is an American lawyer and politician who served as Vermont's Attorney General from 1973 to 1975.

== Early life and career ==
Cheney is one of four sons born to Kimberly Cheney and Margreta Curtis Swenson Cheney of West Hartford, Connecticut. He graduated with a BA in English from Yale University in 1957. After graduation he enlisted in the US Navy for four years of active duty, married Barbara Suter in Tokyo, Japan (with whom he had two children, Alison and Margreta), and upon discharge from the Navy enrolled in University of Connecticut Law School transferring to, and graduating from, Yale Law School in 1964. Barbara earned a MA degree in Social work at the University of Connecticut at that time. Cheney wrote an article relating to both professions. He left the Navy reserve as a Lieutenant USNR in 1967.

From 1964 to 1967, he practiced law in New Haven Connecticut with the firm of Gumbart, Corbin, Tyler and Cooper. In 1967, the Cheney family relocated to Montpelier, Vermont, where Cheney was appointed an Assistant Attorney General, the first to be assigned to the Vermont Department of Education. In 1968 he resigned as an Assistant Attorney General and ran for election as a Republican and was elected to be the first full time Washington County State's Attorney.

In 1972 he was elected as Vermont Attorney General, and was appointed as Deputy Attorney General. In 1973 he was sworn in as Attorney General. He is most remembered for processing the litigation against the State of New York and the US Environmental Agency for polluting Lake Champlain, writing an open records law, and particularly for an Attorney General's tongue-in-cheek opinion allowing him to keep his dog, Hector, in the office arguing that dogs had rights as well as humans to pursue happiness. He was defeated for reelection in 1974 by about 500 votes after Republicans lost electoral favor following Richard Nixon's resignation and subsequent pardon by Gerald Ford arising out of the Watergate affair. He left office in 1975 to open a solo law practice in Montpelier.

He and Barbara separated in 1975 and were divorced soon thereafter. She moved out of state while the children remained in Montpelier with Kim. He then married Dorothy Tod in 1977. Their son, Kimberly Benjamin Cheney, was born that year. They divorced in 1993. Dorothy moved out of Montelier. Benjamin continued to reside with his father.

In 1978, Cheney formed a law firm entitled Cheney, Brock, and Saudek, and continued practicing law with some changes in the partners, until the firm closed in 2016. Cheney then served as "of counsel" to the Barr Law Group in Stowe, Vermont, until 2019 when he retired. His litigation practice included personal injury, criminal law, professional regulation, estates, and family law.

In 1977, Governor Richard Snelling appointed him to be Chairman of the Vermont Labor Relations Board that has jurisdiction over public employee employment grievances, and unfair labor practices in public sector bargaining, including all state employees and teachers. He initiated publishing Board opinions. He wrote an article describing Vermont's unique system of grievance resolution by a public board as distinguished from the usual practice of private arbitration. He became a voluntary labor law arbitrator on panels maintained by the American Arbitration Association, (which awarded him the Whitney North Seymour Sr. Arbitration Medal in 1983, "in recognition of outstanding contributions to the responsible use of arbitrations"), and the New York Public Employment Relations Board. Cheney resigned from the Labor Board in 1986.

In addition to practicing law, Cheney participated in several civic boards, often becoming chairman. These include the Committee to Advise the Vermont Supreme Court on Criminal Rules of Procedure, the Vermont Advisory Committee to the US Civil Rights Commission, the Vermont State Employees Credit Union. He was elected to the Montpelier School Board and served as Chair of the Montpelier Planning Commission. Cheney ran unsuccessfully as a Democrat for a seat in the State Senate in 2002, 2004, and 2008, finishing 231 votes short of Republican Governor Phil Scott, then an incumbent, for a seat.

In 1983, Cheney's family law practice inspired him to form a legislative panel with Trine Beck Esq. to reform the criteria for judges to decide child custody cases. The law requires judges to determine the best interests of the children by considering which parent best provided the child with love, affection, and guidance, fostered the child's safety, met the child's developmental needs, and was best able to communicate with the other parent, among other factors. That project was inspired by a series of cases in which one judge routinely awarded custody to the husband on the theory that women were responsible for holding the family together and having failed at that could not have custody. Cheney's work in family law concluded in 1986, by forming a Task Force to reform Vermont Adoption Law, resulting in substantial changes in adoption practice including clarity in relinquishments, requiring realistic parental consents, and enlarging the ability of adoptees to search for their birth parents.

Upon retirement Cheney wrote a memoir entitled A Lawyer's Life to Live. Therein he recounts learning about criminal law and the functions of county prosecuting attorney in navigating the policy issues resulting from the social upheaval caused by the Vietnam War and the "War on Drugs." Plus his anger caused by a "dirty cop" working in drug enforcement, the moral laxity of his own Assistant Attorney General, and the malevolence of the Commissioner of the State Police in covering up that officer's scheme to make multiple self-aggrandizing fraudulent arrests. He summarizes his various legislative initiatives.

== Publications ==
- Cheney, Kimberley B. (1994). Labor and employment in Vermont: A complete desktop guide to employment law. Carlsbad, CA: Butterworths. ISBN 0-88063-789-7. OCLC 32113288.
- Cheney, Kimberly B. (2021). A lawyer's life to live. Montpelier, VT: Rootstock Publishing. ISBN 978-1-57869-047-3. OCLC 1241091900.

Party political offices
Preceded by Jim Jeffords	Republican nominee for Vermont Attorney General; 1972, 1974	Succeeded by John P. Meaker
Legal offices
Preceded by Jim Jeffords	Attorney General of Vermont; 1973–1975	Succeeded by M. Jerome Diamond
