= Edwin Granai =

American politician (1931–2014)

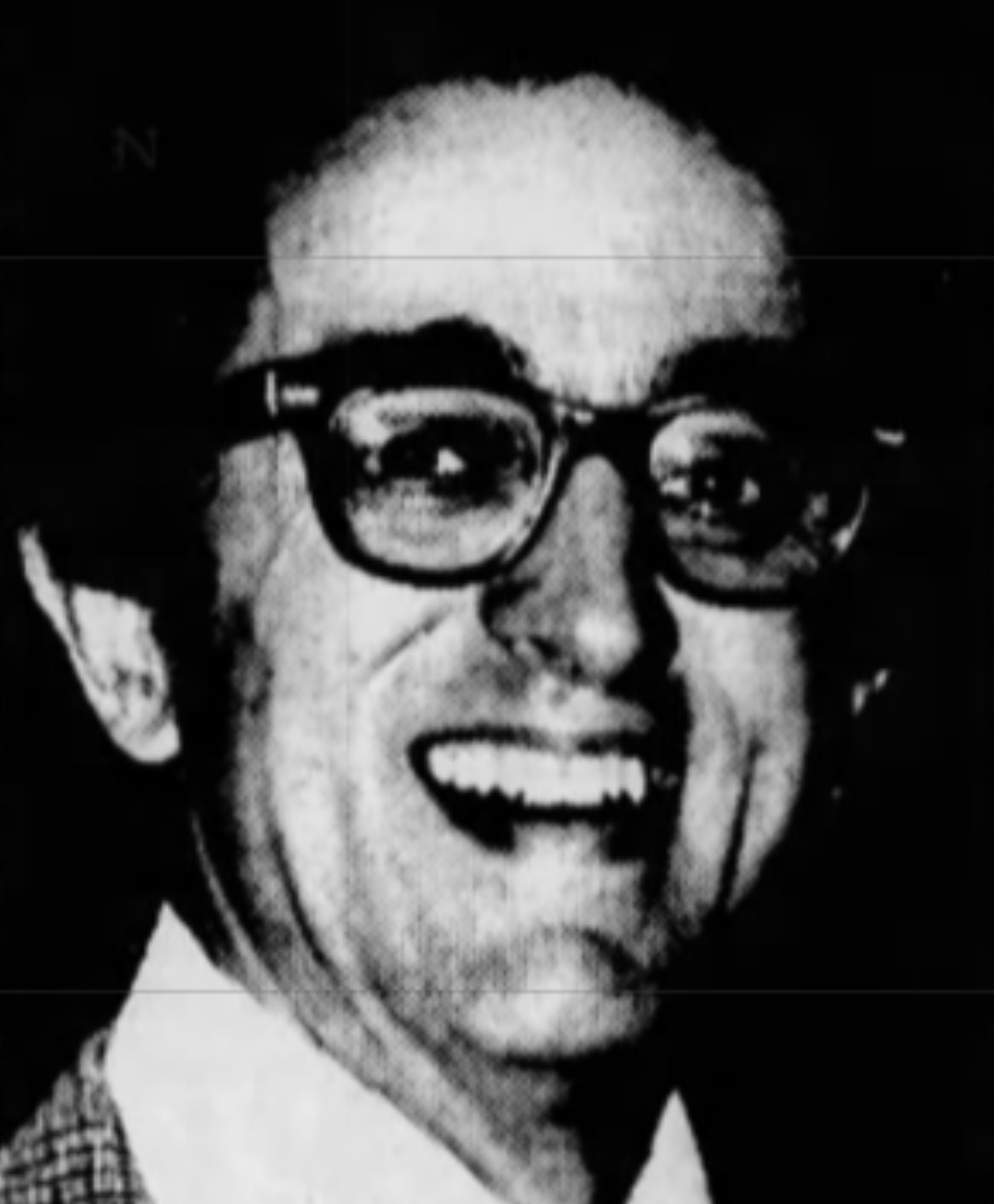
- Granai in 1978

Member of the Vermont House of Representatives
- In office January 1975 – January 10, 1979
- Governor: Thomas P. Salmon; Richard A. Snelling

Member of the Vermont State Senate
- In office January 10, 1991 – December 29, 1993
- Governor: Richard A. Snelling; Howard Dean
- Succeeded by: Judy Stephany
- Constituency: Chittenden Senate District

Personal details
- Party: Democratic Party

Edwin C. Granai (August 16, 1931 – November 17, 2014) was an American politician, businessman and minister who served as a member of the Vermont House of Representatives and the Vermont State Senate. A member of the Democratic Party, Granai was that party's nominee for Governor of Vermont in 1978, losing heavily to incumbent Republican Richard Snelling. From 1981 to 1985 he served as Chairman of the Vermont Democratic Party.
