= Attorney General Easton =

Attorney General Easton may refer to:

- John Easton (1624–1705), Attorney General of Rhode Island
- John J. Easton Jr. (born 1943), Attorney General of Vermont
- Rufus Easton (1774–1834), Attorney General of Missouri
