= M. Jerome Diamond =

American lawyer (born 1942)

Jerry Diamond
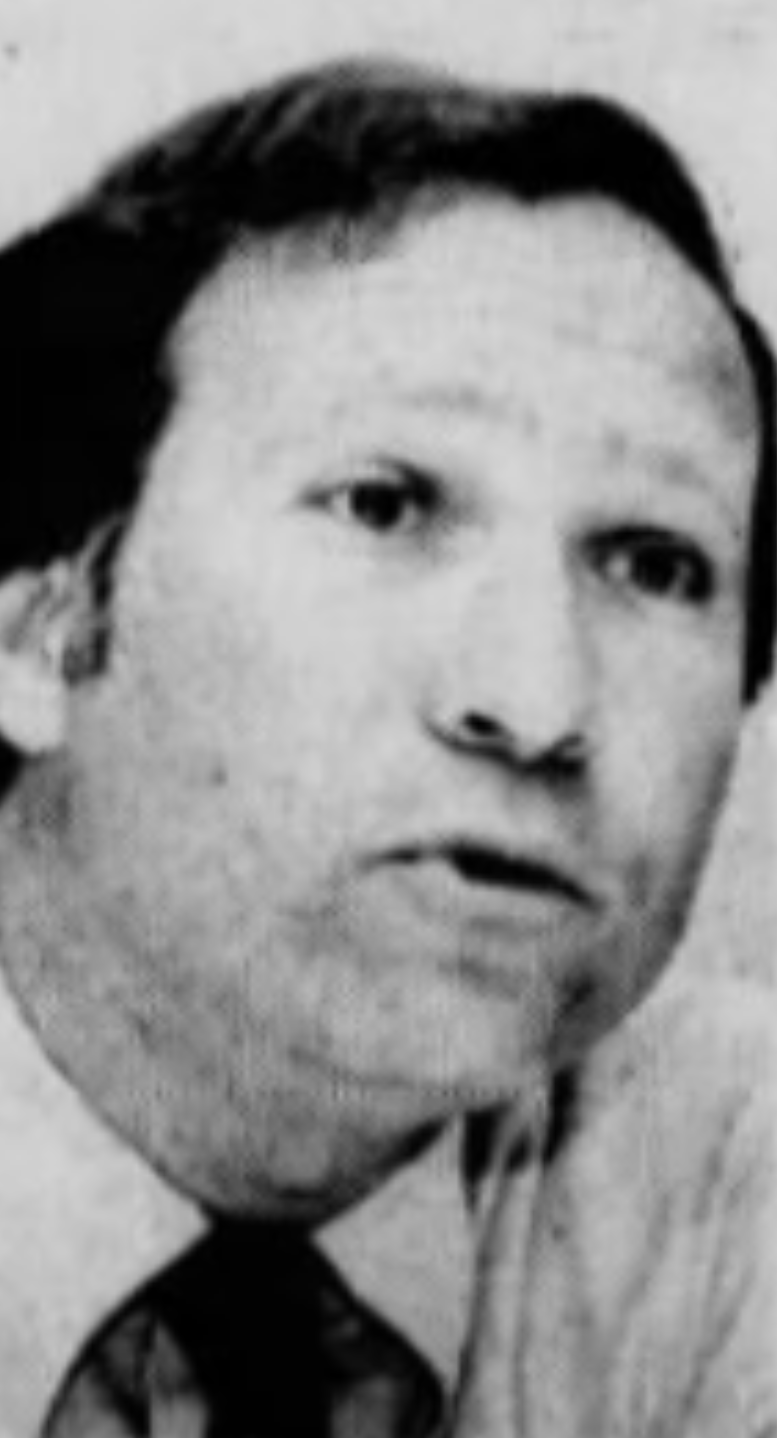

Attorney General of Vermont
- In office January 1975 – January 1981
- Governor: Thomas P. Salmon; Richard A. Snelling
- Preceded by: Kimberly B. Cheney
- Succeeded by: John J. Easton Jr.

Personal details
- Born: Michael Jerome Diamond; March 16, 1942 (age 84) Chicago, Illinois, U.S.
- Party: Democratic
- Education: George Washington University (BA); University of Tennessee (MA, JD)

Michael Jerome "Jerry" Diamond (born March 16, 1942) is an American attorney and politician. He served as Vermont Attorney General from 1975 to 1981 and was the unsuccessful Democratic nominee for Governor of Vermont in 1980.

== Biography ==
Michael Jerome "Jerry" Diamond was born in Chicago, Illinois on March 16, 1942. Diamond was raised in Tennessee, and graduated from George Washington University in 1963. He received a master's degree from the University of Tennessee in 1965 and a Juris Doctor degree from the University of Tennessee College of Law in 1968. Diamond served on the University of Tennessee faculty as a political science instructor while attending law school.

Diamond was admitted to the bar, and served as law clerk for Judge Ernest W. Gibson Jr. in 1968 and 1969. He then moved to Brattleboro to practice law.

In 1970 Governor Deane C. Davis appointed Diamond State's Attorney for Windham County, filling the vacancy created when Judge Gibson’s son, David A. Gibson resigned. Diamond won election to a full term as a Democrat later in 1970. He served from 1970 to 1975.

In 1974 Diamond was the successful Democratic nominee for Vermont Attorney General. He was reelected in 1976 and again in 1978 and served three two-year terms, 1975 to 1981. In 1980 he was the unsuccessful Democratic nominee for governor, losing to incumbent Richard A. Snelling.

After leaving the Attorney General’s office Diamond continued to practice law in Montpelier as a partner in Diamond & Robinson, a firm which includes his son and two stepsons. He served as president of the National Association of Attorneys General in 1980 and remained active with the organization after leaving office.

Diamond was a member of the Vermont Advisory Group for the United States Commission on Civil Rights from 1985 to 2009. He was chairman of the Grants Committee for the Vermont Bar Foundation from 1990 to 1993. From 1997 to 2007 he was a director of the Vermont Bar Foundation. From 1994 to 2012 Diamond was a trustee of Vermont Law School.

In 2013 Diamond represented Governor Peter Shumlin during negotiations connected to a controversial land deal between Shumlin and his East Montpelier neighbor.

== See also ==
- List of Jewish American jurists

Political offices
Preceded by Kimberly B. Cheney	Attorney General of Vermont; 1975–1981	Succeeded by John J. Easton Jr.
Party political offices
Preceded by Richard Gadbois	Democratic nominee for Vermont Attorney General; 1974, 1976, 1978	Succeeded by Scott Skinner
Preceded by Edwin Granai	Democratic nominee for Governor of Vermont; 1980	Succeeded by Madeleine Kunin
