= 1990 Vermont gubernatorial election =

- November 6, 1990
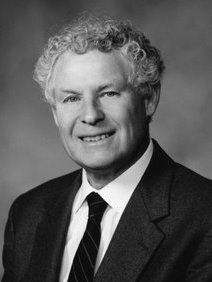

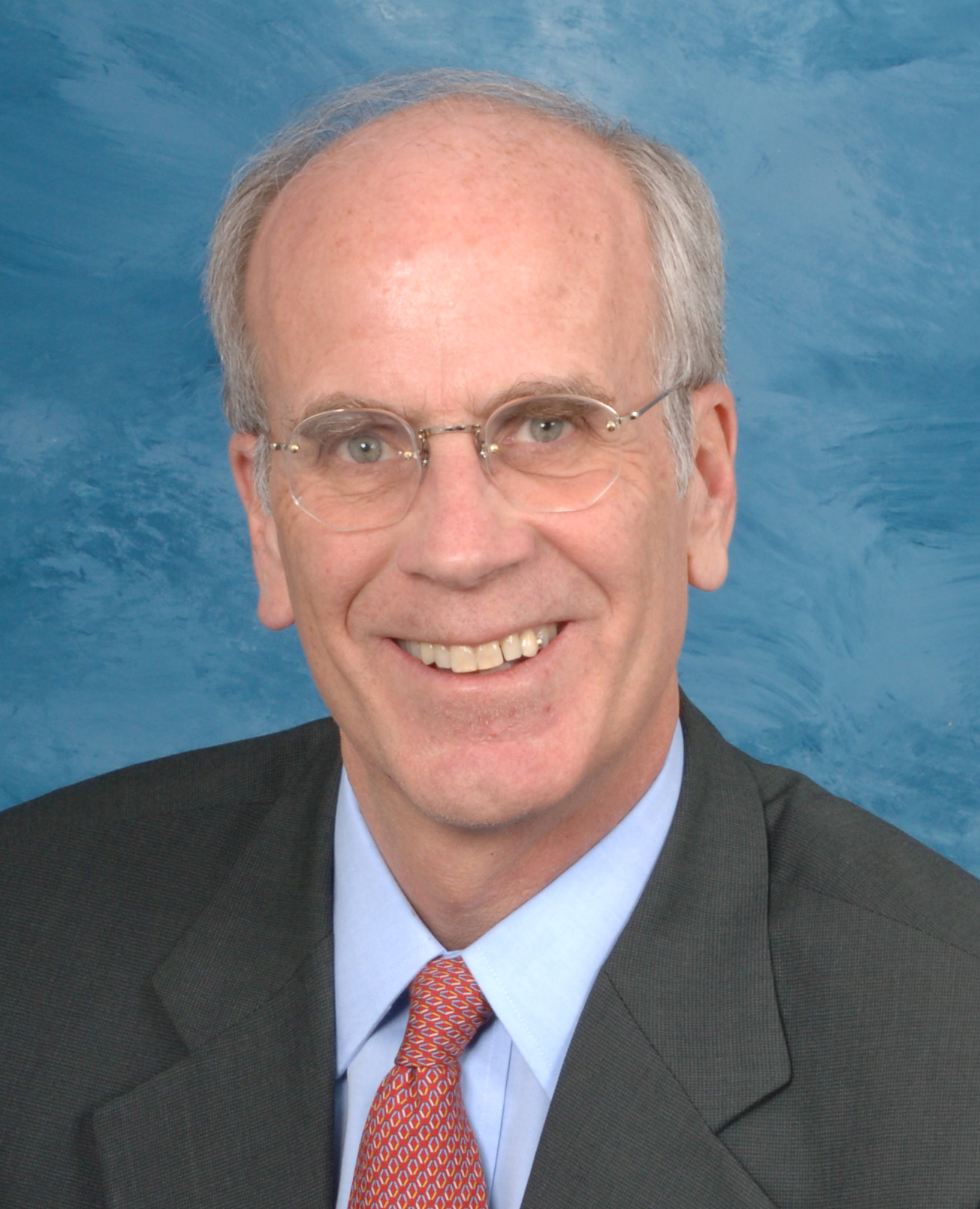
Nominee	Richard Snelling	Peter Welch
Party	Republican	Democratic
Popular vote	109,540	97,321
Percentage	51.81%	46.03%
- Snelling: 40–50% 50–60% 60–70% 70–80% 80–90% Welch: 40–50% 50–60% 60–70%
Governor before election
Madeleine Kunin
Democratic
Elected Governor
Richard Snelling
Republican

The 1990 Vermont gubernatorial election took place on November 6, 1990. Incumbent Governor Madeleine Kunin, a Democrat, did not seek re-election. Former Governor Republican Richard Snelling, who had previously served as governor from 1977 to 1985, defeated Democratic former State Senate President pro tempore Peter Welch in the general election. This would be the last Republican victory in a Vermont gubernatorial election until 2002.

Snelling would serve only eight months before dying in office. He was succeeded by Democratic lieutenant governor Howard Dean. Welch would go on to be elected to U.S. Congress in 2006, and the U.S. Senate in 2022.

== Democratic primary ==
=== Candidates ===
- Peter Welch, former State Senate President pro tempore and candidate for the U.S. House in 1988
- William Gwin

=== Results ===
Democratic Primary results
Party	Candidate	Votes	%
Democratic	Peter Welch	14,661	86.60
Democratic	William Gwin	1,719	10.15
Democratic	Write-ins	550	3.25
Total votes		16,930	100.00

== Republican primary ==
=== Candidates ===
- Richard Snelling, former Governor and nominee for the U.S. Senate in 1986
- Richard F. Gottlieb, perennial candidate

=== Results ===
Republican primary results
Party	Candidate	Votes	%
Republican	Richard Snelling	38,881	86.65
Republican	Richard F. Gottlieb	5,503	12.26
Republican	Write-ins	485	1.08
Total votes		44,869	100.00

== Libertarian primary ==
=== Candidates ===
- David Atkinson

=== Results ===
Libertarian primary results
Party	Candidate	Votes	%
Libertarian	David Atkinson	113	70.63
Libertarian	Write-ins	47	29.38
Total votes		160	100.00

== General election ==
=== Results ===
1990 Vermont gubernatorial election
Party	Candidate	Votes	%	±%
Republican	Richard Snelling	109,540	51.81%	+8.49%
Democratic	Peter Welch	97,321	46.03%	−9.31%
Libertarian	David Atkinson	2,777	1.31%	
Liberty Union	Richard Gottlieb	1,389	0.66%	−0.55%
Write-ins		395	0.19%	
Majority		12,219	5.78%	−6.25%
Turnout		211,422		
Republican gain from Democratic				

== See also ==
- 1990 United States gubernatorial elections
