= 1966 Vermont gubernatorial election =

- November 8, 1966
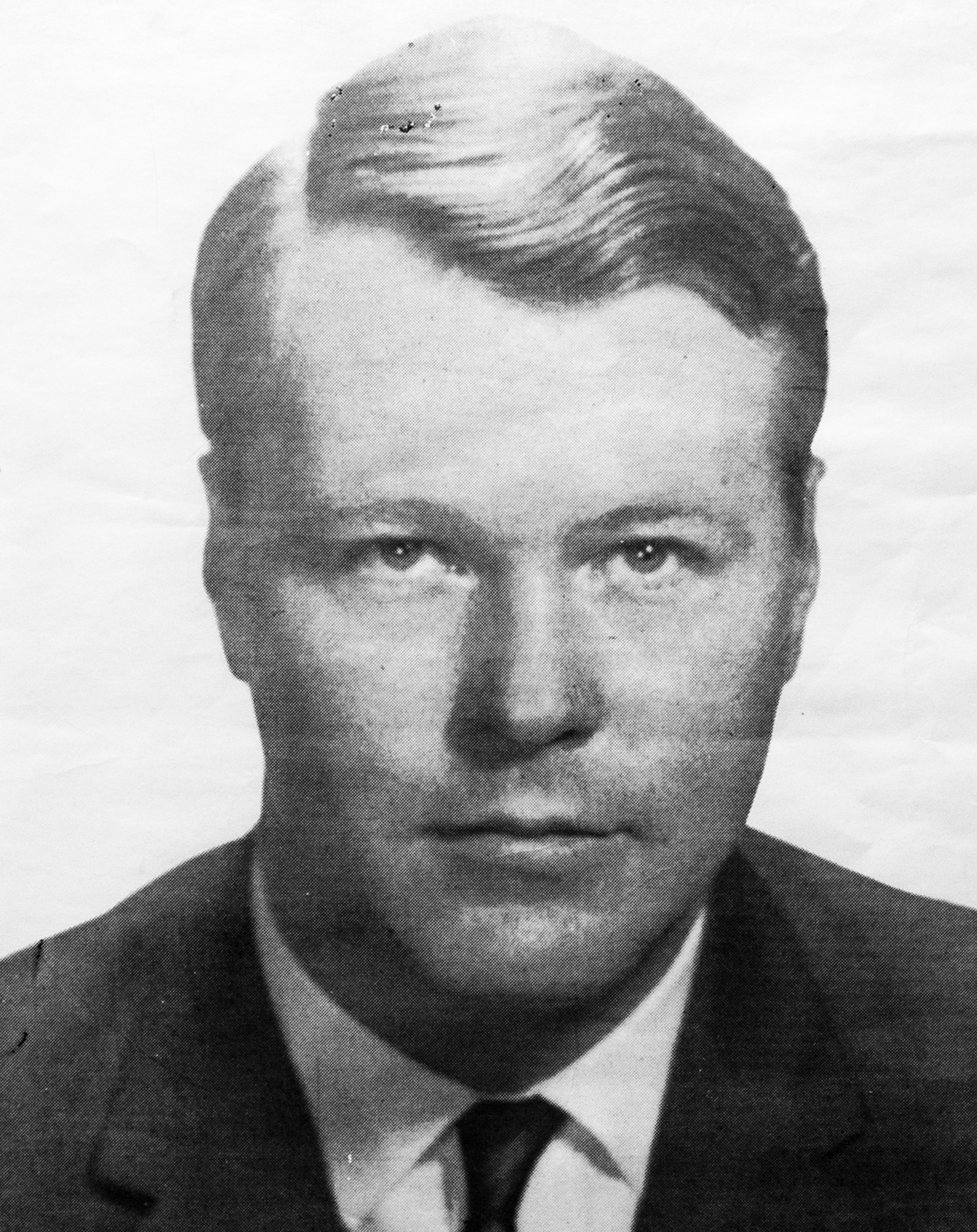

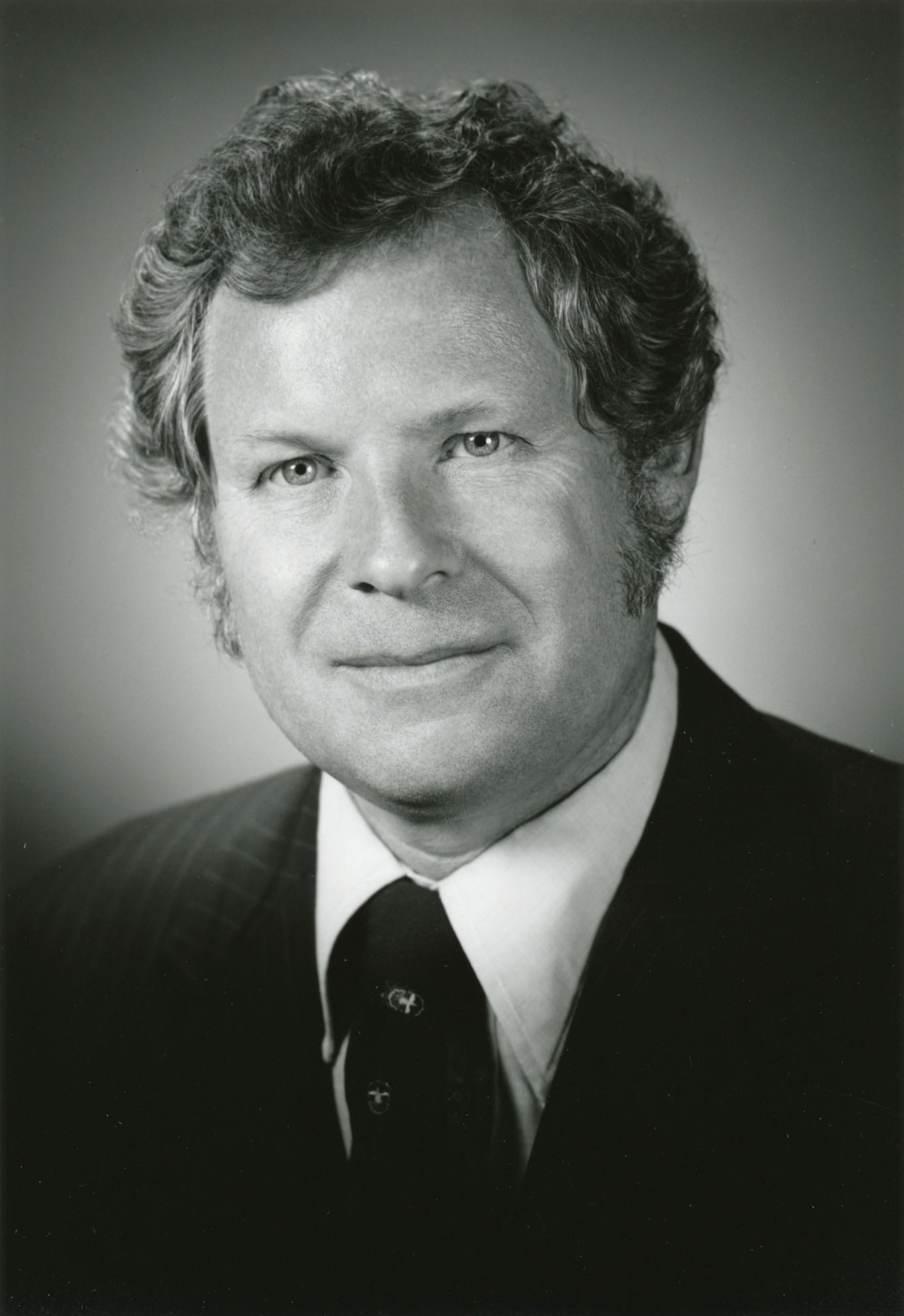
Nominee	Philip H. Hoff	Richard A. Snelling
Party	Democratic	Republican
Popular vote	78,669	57,577
Percentage	57.73%	42.26%
- County results Hoff: 50–60% 60–70% Snelling: 50–60%
Governor before election
Philip H. Hoff
Democratic
Elected Governor
Philip H. Hoff
Democratic

The 1966 Vermont gubernatorial election took place on November 8, 1966. Incumbent Democrat Philip H. Hoff ran successfully for re-election to a third term as Governor of Vermont, defeating Republican candidate Richard A. Snelling.

== Democratic primary ==
=== Results ===
Democratic primary results
Party	Candidate	Votes	%	±%
Democratic	Philip H. Hoff (inc.)	11,777	99.8	
Democratic	Other	28	0.2	
Total votes		11,805	100.0	

== Republican primary ==
=== Results ===
Republican primary results
Party	Candidate	Votes	%	±%
Republican	Richard A. Snelling	22,069	59.0	
Republican	Thomas L. Hayes	15,286	40.9	
Republican	Other	58	0.1	
Total votes		37,413	100.0	

== General election ==
=== Results ===
1966 Vermont gubernatorial election
Party	Candidate	Votes	%	±%
Democratic	Philip H. Hoff (inc.)	78,669	57.73	
Republican	Richard A. Snelling	57,577	42.26	
N/A	Other	16	0.01	
Total votes		136,262	100.0	
