= Peter Plympton Smith =

American politician (born 1945)

Peter Smith
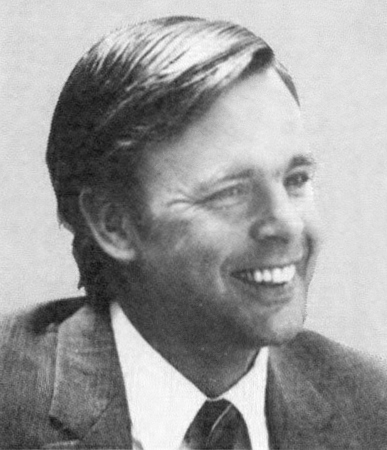

Member of the U.S. House of Representatives from Vermont's at-large district
- In office January 3, 1989 – January 3, 1991
- Preceded by: Jim Jeffords
- Succeeded by: Bernie Sanders

76th Lieutenant Governor of Vermont
- In office January 10, 1983 – January 3, 1987
- Governor: Richard Snelling; Madeleine Kunin
- Preceded by: Madeleine Kunin
- Succeeded by: Howard Dean

Personal details
- Born: Peter Plympton Smith; October 31, 1945 (age 80) Boston, Massachusetts, U.S.
- Party: Republican
- Education: Princeton University (BA); Harvard University (MA, EdD)

Peter Plympton Smith (born October 31, 1945) is an American educator and politician who served as a member of the United States House of Representatives from the U.S. state of Vermont, the 76th lieutenant governor of Vermont, and an education administrator. He served as the founding president of the Community College of Vermont, the founding president of California State University, Monterey Bay, and as assistant director general for education of the United Nations Educational, Scientific, and Cultural Organization (UNESCO).

== Early life and education ==
Smith was born in Boston, Massachusetts, and was raised in Burlington, Vermont. He is the son of Burlington banker and Vermont State Senator Frederick Plympton Smith. He graduated from Phillips Academy in 1964 and received an A.B. in history from Princeton University in 1968 after completing a senior thesis titled "Burlington, Vermont, 1791-1848: A Study of Economic Development and Social Change in a Community." In 1970, he received a M.A.T. from the Harvard University Graduate School of Education. He received his Ed.D. from the Harvard Graduate School of Education in administration, planning, and social policy in 1983.

== Career in education and politics ==
Smith served one year as an assistant to the Vermont Commissioner of Education. In 1970, he became the founding president of the Community College of Vermont, a Vermont State College. He first ran for office in 1978, defeating incumbent Lieutenant Governor of Vermont T. Garry Buckley in the Republican primary but losing the general election for Lieutenant Governor to Democrat Madeleine M. Kunin.

=== State senator ===
Between 1981 and 1983, he served as a Vermont State Senator representing the Washington County district. After Kunin chose not to run for re-election in 1982, Smith was elected to succeed her. He served two two-year terms. He ran for Governor of Vermont in 1986 but was defeated by Kunin.

=== Congress ===
After two years as Vice President of Development at Norwich University he was elected to the United States House of Representatives in 1988 for Vermont's at-large congressional district. In 1990, he was defeated in his bid for re-election by Independent Bernie Sanders.

=== Books ===
Smith wrote Your Hidden Credentials: The Value of Personal Learning Outside College, (Acropolis Books, Ltd, 1986). The book promotes college credit for life experience. Smith is also the author of The Quiet Crisis: How Higher Education Is Failing America, (Anker Publishing Company, Inc., 2004) which received juried acclaim from the American Association of Continuing Education. His third book, Harnessing America's Wasted Talent: New Dimensions for Higher Education (Jossey-Bass, 2010) was published in early 2010. His fourth book, Free-range Learning in the Digital Age: The Emerging Revolution in College, Career, and Education (SelectBooks) was published in 2018.

=== Later career ===
From 1991 to 1994, Smith served as dean of the Graduate School of Education and Human Development at George Washington University. In 1994 Smith became president of California State University, Monterey Bay, a post that he vacated in 2005. Beginning June 20, 2005, Smith served as assistant director general for education of the United Nations Educational, Scientific, and Cultural Organization (UNESCO). He left UNESCO in 2007.

In April 2016, University of Maryland University College announced that Smith had been appointed to a term as the Orkand Endowed Chair and Professor of Innovative Practices in Higher Education. In this position, Smith was responsible for identifying and implementing measures to improve the school's learning and support services delivery. He retired from that position in 2022.

In 2016 Smith was one of thirty former Republican congressmen to sign a letter opposing Donald Trump's candidacy for president.

== Bibliography ==
- Smith, Peter P. (1982) Your Hidden Credentials: the Value of Learning Outside College
- Smith, Peter P. (2004) The Quiet Crisis: How Higher Education is Failing America. Anker ISBN 1-882982-70-3
- Appearances on C-SPAN
- United States Congress. "Peter Plympton Smith (id: S000601)". Biographical Directory of the United States Congress.

Party political offices
Preceded by T. Garry Buckley	Republican nominee for Lieutenant Governor of Vermont; 1978	Succeeded by Peg Garland
Preceded by Peg Garland	Republican nominee for Lieutenant Governor of Vermont; 1982, 1984	Succeeded by Susan Auld
Preceded by John J. Easton Jr.	Republican nominee for Governor of Vermont; 1986	Succeeded by Michael Bernhardt
Political offices
Preceded by Madeleine Kunin	Lieutenant Governor of Vermont; 1983–1987	Succeeded by Howard Dean
U.S. House of Representatives
Preceded by Jim Jeffords	Member of the U.S. House of Representatives from Vermont's at-large congressional district 1989–1991	Succeeded by Bernie Sanders
U.S. order of precedence (ceremonial)
Preceded by Wiley Nickel as Former U.S. Representative	Order of precedence of the United States as Former U.S. Representative	Succeeded by Mike Ward as Former U.S. Representative
