= 1978 Vermont gubernatorial election =

- November 7, 1978
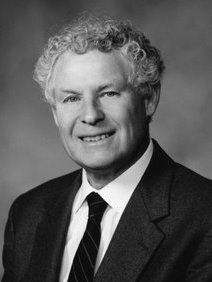

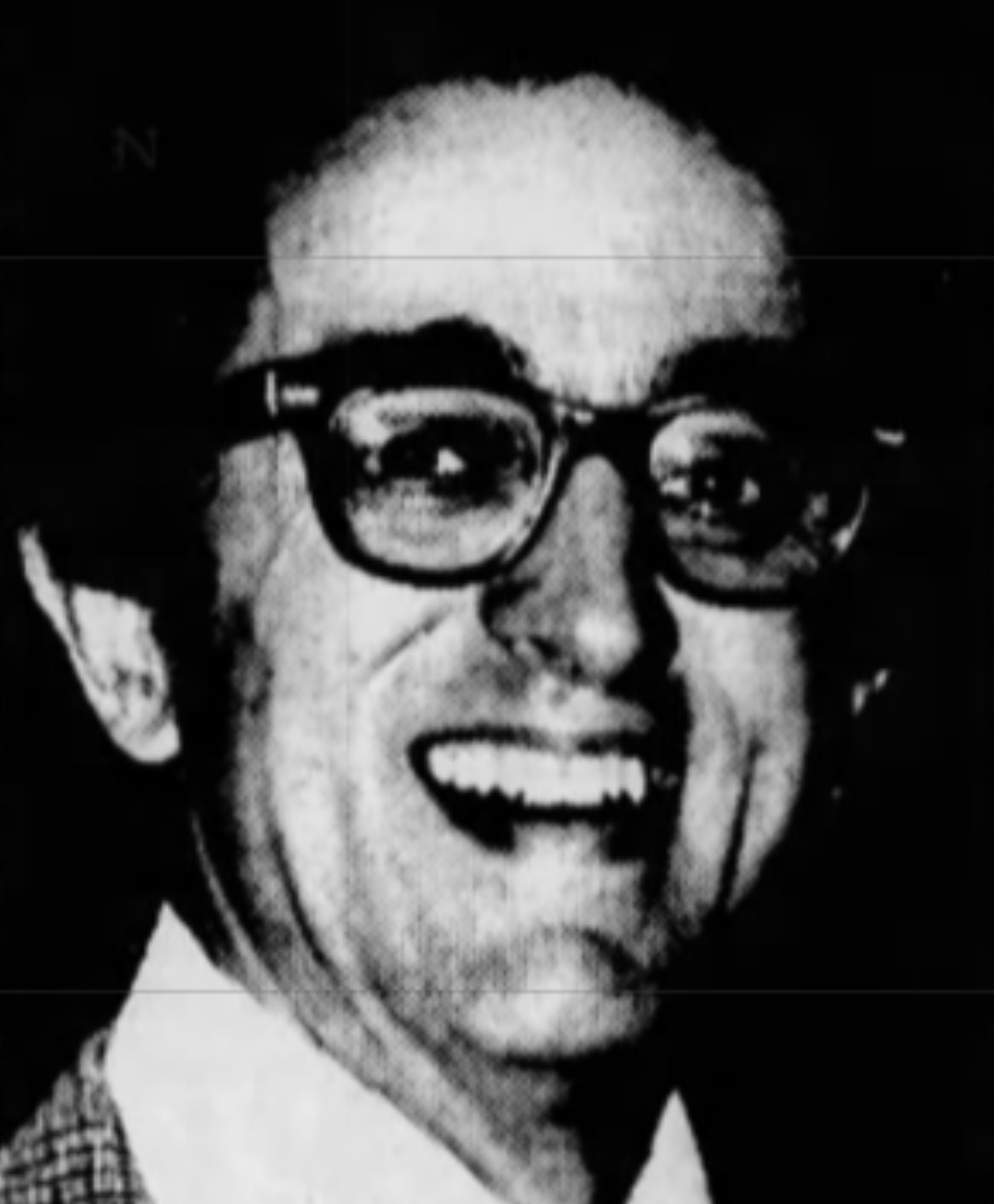
Nominee	Richard Snelling	Edwin Granai
Party	Republican	Democratic
Popular vote	78,181	42,482
Percentage	62.80%	34.13%
- Snelling: 40–50% 50–60% 60–70% 70–80% 80–90% >90% Granai: 40–50% 50–60%
Governor before election
Richard Snelling
Republican
Elected Governor
Richard Snelling
Republican

The 1978 Vermont gubernatorial election took place on November 7, 1978. Incumbent Republican Richard Snelling ran successfully for a second term as Governor of Vermont, defeating Democratic candidate Edwin Granai. As of 2014, this was the most recent Vermont gubernatorial election in which both major party candidates are now deceased.

== Republican primary ==
=== Results ===
Republican primary results
Party	Candidate	Votes	%	±%
Republican	Richard A. Snelling (inc.)	30,454	99.0	
Republican	Other	316	1.0	
Total votes		30,770	100.0	

== Democratic primary ==
=== Results ===
Democratic primary results
Party	Candidate	Votes	%	±%
Democratic	Edwin C. Granai	8,572	64.6	
Democratic	Bernard O'Shea	4,570	34.5	
Democratic	Other	121	0.9	
Total votes		13,263	100.0	

== Liberty Union primary ==
=== Results ===
Liberty Union primary results
Party	Candidate	Votes	%	±%
Liberty Union	Earl S. Gardner	174	93.0	
Liberty Union	Other	13	7.0	
Total votes		187	100.0	

== General election ==
=== Candidates ===
- Earl S. Gardner (Liberty Union)
- Edwin Granai (Democratic), state representative
- Richard A. Snelling (Republican), incumbent Governor of Vermont

=== Results ===
1978 Vermont gubernatorial election
Party	Candidate	Votes	%	±%
Republican	Richard A. Snelling (inc.)	78,181	62.80	
Democratic	Edwin C. Granai	42,482	34.13	
Liberty Union	Earl S. Gardner	3,629	2.92	
N/A	Other	190	0.15	
Total votes		124,482	100.0	
