= 1980 Vermont gubernatorial election =

- November 4, 1980
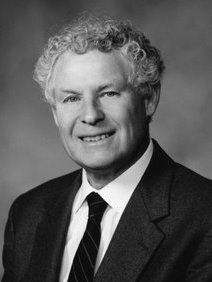

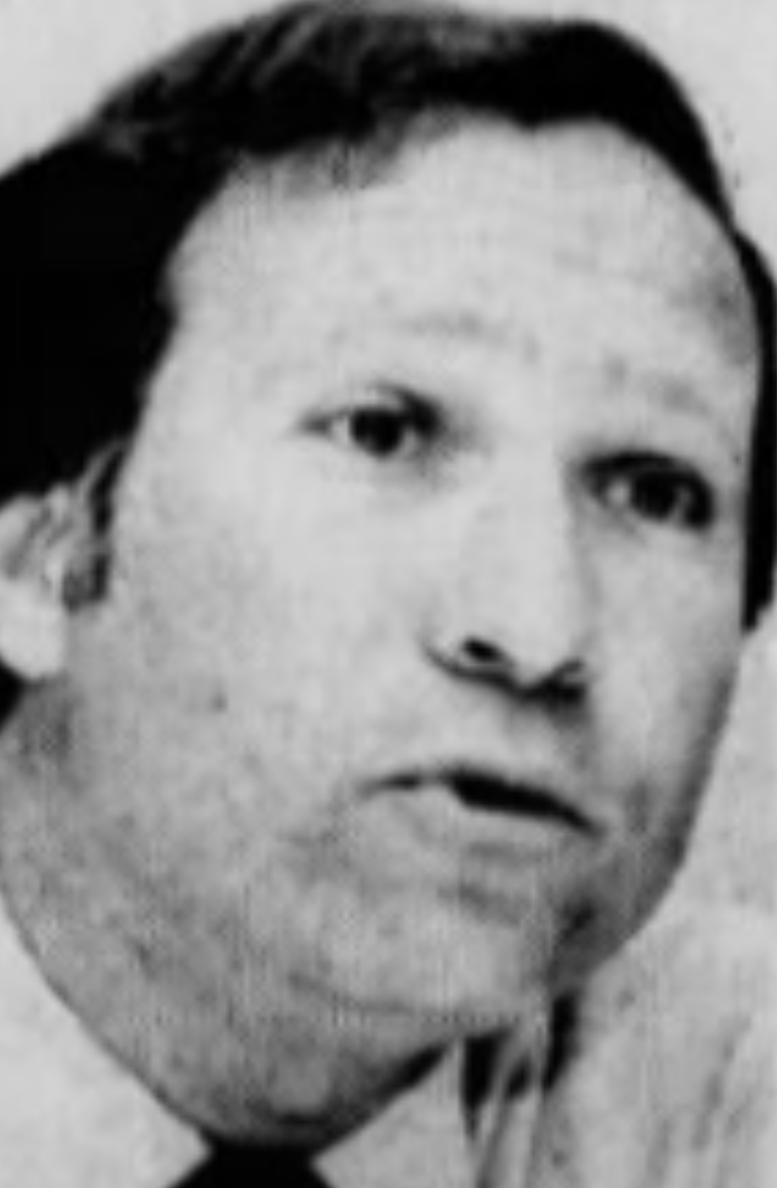
| Nominee | Richard Snelling | M. Jerome Diamond |
| Party | Republican | Democratic |
| Popular vote | 123,229 | 76,826 |
| Percentage | 58.72% | 36.61% |
- Snelling: 40–50% 50–60% 60–70% 70–80% 80–90% >90% Diamond: 40–50% 50–60% 60–70% Woodward: 50–60%
Governor before election
Richard Snelling
Republican
Elected Governor
Richard Snelling
Republican

The 1980 Vermont gubernatorial election took place on November 4, 1980. Incumbent Republican Richard A. Snelling ran successfully for a third term as Governor of Vermont, defeating Democratic candidate M. Jerome Diamond.

To date, this marks the most recent time that Republicans won the races for Governor and for president concurrently.

== Republican primary ==
=== Results ===
Republican primary results
| Party | Candidate | Votes | % | ±% |
|---|---|---|---|---|
| Republican | Richard A. Snelling (inc.) | 38,228 | 85.0 | |
| Republican | Clifford Thompson | 3,432 | 7.6 | |
| Republican | Kirk E. Faryniasz | 2,273 | 5.1 | |
| Republican | Other | 1,059 | 2.4 | |
| Total votes | | 44,992 | 100.0 | |

== Democratic primary ==
=== Results ===
Democratic primary results
| Party | Candidate | Votes | % | ±% |
|---|---|---|---|---|
| Democratic | M. Jerome Diamond | 15,738 | 50.4 | |
| Democratic | Timothy J. O'Connor | 14,857 | 47.5 | |
| Democratic | John Potthast | 406 | 1.3 | |
| Democratic | Other | 255 | 0.8 | |
| Total votes | | 31,256 | 100.0 | |

== Liberty Union primary ==
=== Results ===
Liberty Union primary results
| Party | Candidate | Votes | % | ±% |
|---|---|---|---|---|
| Liberty Union | Scattering | 80 | 100.0 | |
| Total votes | | 80 | 100.0 | |

== General election ==
=== Results ===
1980 Vermont gubernatorial election
| Party | Candidate | Votes | % | ±% |
|---|---|---|---|---|
| Republican | Richard A. Snelling (inc.) | 123,229 | 58.72 | |
| Democratic | M. Jerome Diamond | 76,826 | 36.61 | |
| Independent | Daniel E. Woodward | 5,323 | 2.54 | |
| Independent | Bruce Cullen | 2,263 | 1.08 | |
| Liberty Union | John Potthast | 1,952 | 0.93 | |
| N/A | Other | 251 | 0.12 | |
| Total votes | | 209,844 | 100.0 | |
