= 1988 Vermont gubernatorial election =

- November 8, 1988
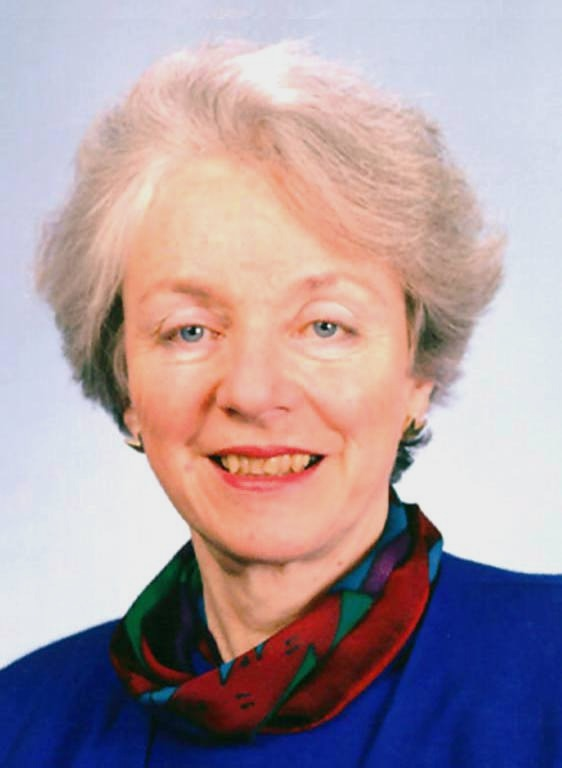

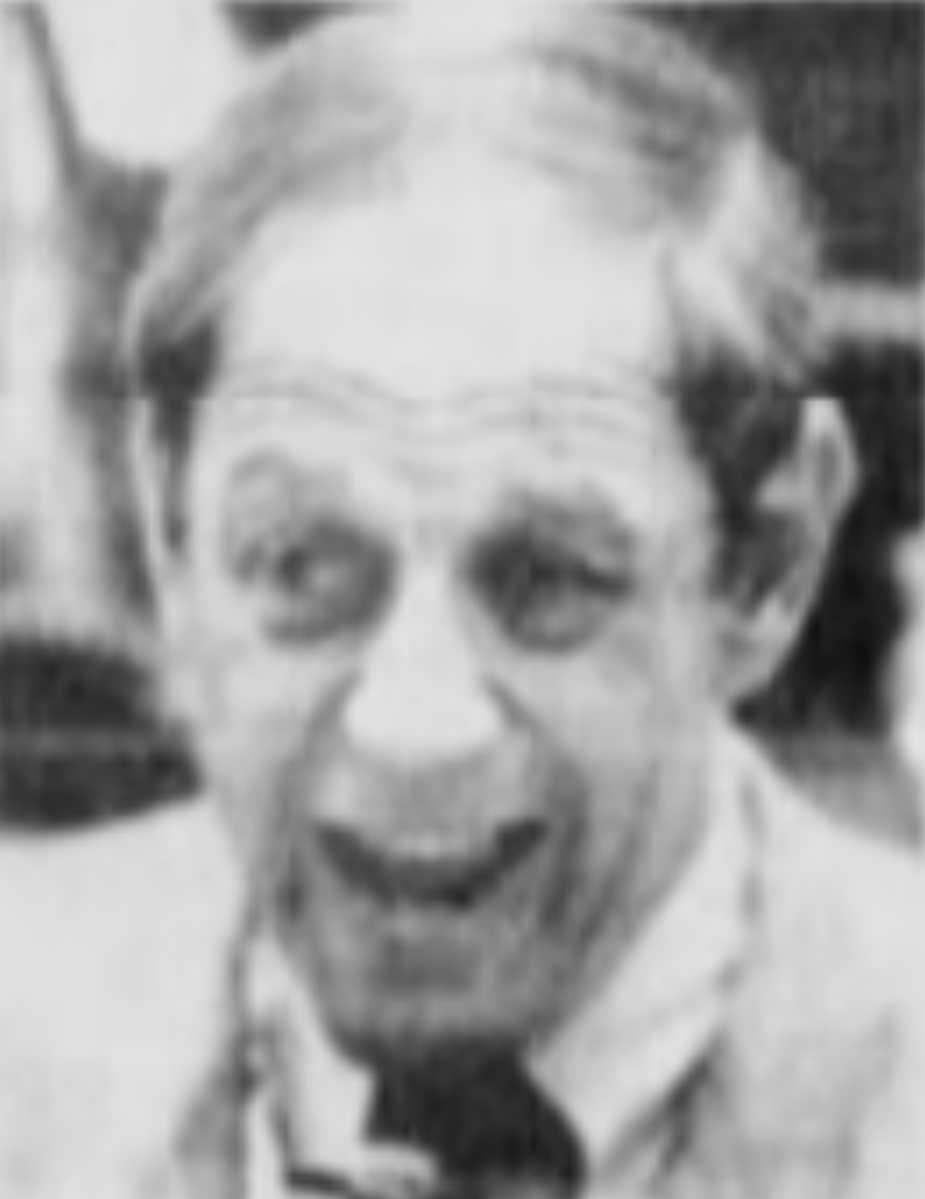
Nominee	Madeleine Kunin	Michael Bernhardt
Party	Democratic	Republican
Popular vote	134,558	105,319
Percentage	55.34%	43.32%
- Kunin: 40–50% 50–60% 60–70% 70–80% Bernhardt: 40–50% 50–60% 60–70% 70–80% 80–90%
Governor before election
Madeleine Kunin
Democratic
Elected Governor
Madeleine Kunin
Democratic

The 1988 Vermont gubernatorial election took place on November 8, 1988. Incumbent Democrat Madeleine Kunin ran successfully for re-election to a third term as Governor of Vermont, defeating Republican candidate Michael Bernhardt.

== Democratic primary ==
=== Results ===
Democratic primary results
Party	Candidate	Votes	%	±%
Democratic	Madeleine M. Kunin (inc.)	28,125	96.8	
Democratic	Other	935	3.2	
Total votes		29,060	100.0	

== Republican primary ==
=== Results ===
Republican primary results
Party	Candidate	Votes	%	±%
Republican	Michael Bernhardt	42,988	97.2	
Republican	Other	1,243	2.8	
Total votes		44,231	100.0	

== Liberty Union primary ==
=== Results ===
Liberty Union primary results
Party	Candidate	Votes	%	±%
Liberty Union	Richard F. Gottlieb	126	93.3	
Liberty Union	Other	9	6.7	
Total votes		135	100.0	

== General election ==
=== Polling ===
Poll source	Date(s)	Sample size	Margin of Error	Kunin	Bernhardt	Gottlieb	Undecided
Rutland Herald; Barre Montpelier Times Argus; University of Vermont	October 6–9, 1988	502 registered voters	± 4.5%	54%'	34%	1%	11%

=== Results ===
1988 Vermont gubernatorial election
Party	Candidate	Votes	%	±%
Democratic	Madeleine M. Kunin (inc.)	134,558	55.34	
Republican	Michael Bernhardt	105,319	43.32	
Liberty Union	Richard F. Gottlieb	2,923	1.20	
N/A	Write-ins	330	0.14	
Total votes		243,130	100.0	

== See also ==
- 1988 United States House of Representatives election in Vermont
- 1988 United States presidential election in Vermont
- 1988 United States Senate election in Vermont
