= John W. Hennessey Jr. =

American academic and educator (1925–2018)

- Born: March 25, 1925; Danville, Pennsylvania, U.S.
- Died: January 11, 2018 (aged 92); Shelburne, Vermont, U.S.
- Spouses: Jean M. Lande (m. 1948; died 2004) Madeleine M. Kunin (m. 2006)

Academic background
- Education: Princeton University

Academic work
- Discipline: Economics
- Sub-discipline: Applied and professional ethics
- Institutions: Dartmouth College; University of Vermont
- Military career
- Allegiance: United States of America
- Branch: U.S. Army
- Service years: 1943–1946
- Rank: First lieutenant
- Units: Ordinance Department, Pacific Theatre – Philippines
- Website: jhennessey.org

John W. Hennessey Jr. (March 25, 1925 – January 11, 2018) was an American academic and educator. He spent most of his life in academia, as professor, dean, and provost. He was Third Century Professor Emeritus at Dartmouth College, where he served for eight years as dean of the Tuck School of Business, during formative years at Tuck. After retiring from teaching applied and professional ethics, he became the provost of the University of Vermont, later serving as interim president

He served on more than thirty boards of nonprofit and corporate entities, often as chair. He became emeritus on the Vermont Law School board in 2007 and received an honorary Doctor of Laws degree at its 2008 commencement, at which Madeleine Kunin was the principal speaker and fellow recipient of an LL.D. degree. Then-New Hampshire Governor John Lynch proclaimed March 25, 2005, Hennessey's 80th birthday, "John W. Hennessey Jr. Day in New Hampshire". He was awarded an LL.D. degree, honoris causa, at the May 2012 Commencement of The University of Vermont.

== Pre-academia ==
His family moved to York, Pennsylvania in 1929 when he was four years old, where Hennessey attended public schools and then entered Princeton University in 1941. He volunteered for army service in 1943 and served in the Ordnance Department, rising from private to first lieutenant. His final year and a half of service was in the Philippine Islands. He returned to the United States in September 1946 and reentered Princeton the next January. In June 1948, he received his A.B. degree in economics and social institutions, magna cum laude, with election to Phi Beta Kappa.

== Personal life ==
His first wife, Jean Lande, was an international environmental commissioner and academic program manager, and she was a leading New Hampshire Democratic strategist and activist. She died in June 2004.

In February 2006, he married Madeleine Kunin, former Governor of Vermont, Ambassador to Switzerland, professor and public commentator on issues of social justice and the environment. In April 2014 the couple moved into Wake Robin, a continuing care retirement community in Shelburne, Vermont.
