= 1986 Vermont gubernatorial election =

- November 4, 1986
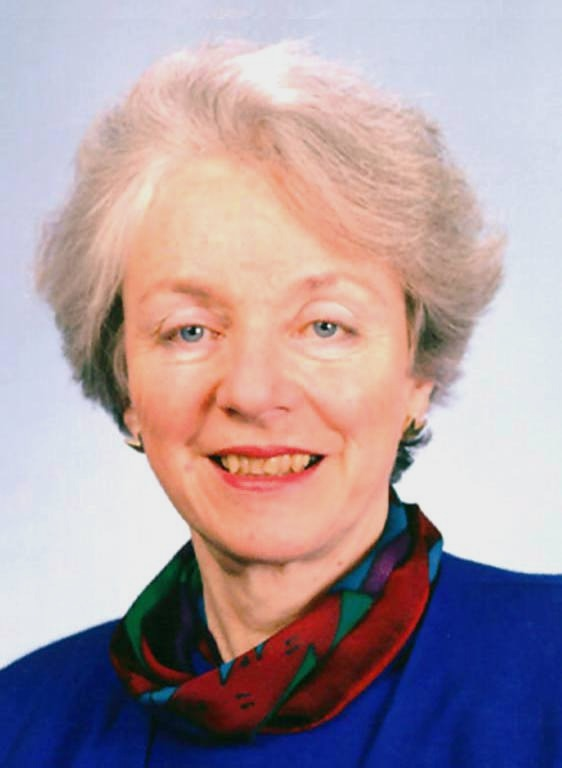

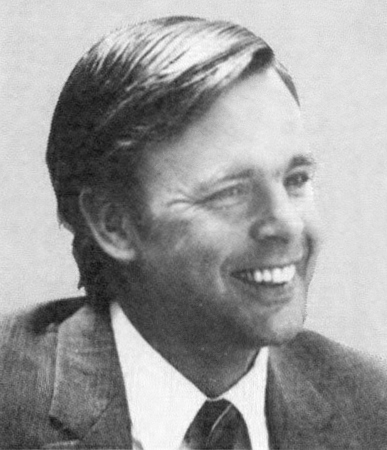

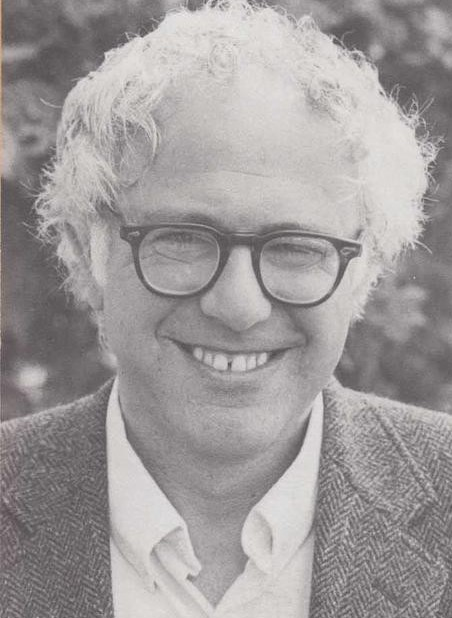
Nominee	Madeleine Kunin	Peter Smith	Bernie Sanders
Party	Democratic	Republican	Independent
Electoral vote	139	39	2
Popular vote	92,485	75,239	28,418
Percentage	47.01%	38.25%	14.45%
- Kunin: 30–40% 40–50% 50–60% 60–70% Smith: 30–40% 40–50% 50–60% 60–70%
Governor before election
Madeleine Kunin
Democratic
Elected Governor
Madeleine Kunin
Democratic

The 1986 Vermont gubernatorial election took place on November 4, 1986. Incumbent Democrat Madeleine Kunin ran successfully for re-election to a second term as Governor of Vermont, defeating Republican candidate Peter Plympton Smith, the incumbent Lieutenant Governor, and independent candidate Bernie Sanders, the mayor of Burlington, Vermont's largest city. Since no candidate won a majority of the popular vote, Kunin was elected by the Vermont General Assembly per the state constitution.

This was the first time since 1912 that none of the candidates received a majority of the vote. Along with Democrats' takeover of the state House for the first time in history, Democrats won a trifecta in the state for the first time ever.

== Democratic primary ==
=== Results ===
Democratic primary results
Party	Candidate	Votes	%
Democratic	Madeleine M. Kunin (inc.)	19,401	95.1
Democratic	Write-ins	993	4.9
Total votes		20,394	100

== Republican primary ==
=== Results ===
Republican primary results
Party	Candidate	Votes	%
Republican	Peter Plympton Smith	24,837	96.8
Republican	Write-ins	813	3.2
Total votes		25,650	100

== Liberty Union primary ==
=== Results ===
Liberty Union primary results
Party	Candidate	Votes	%
Liberty Union	Richard F. Gottlieb	135	86.0
Liberty Union	Bernie Sanders (write-in)	16	10.2
Liberty Union	Write-ins (other)	6	3.8
Total votes		157	100

== General election ==
Pamphlet for Bernie Sanders' campaign
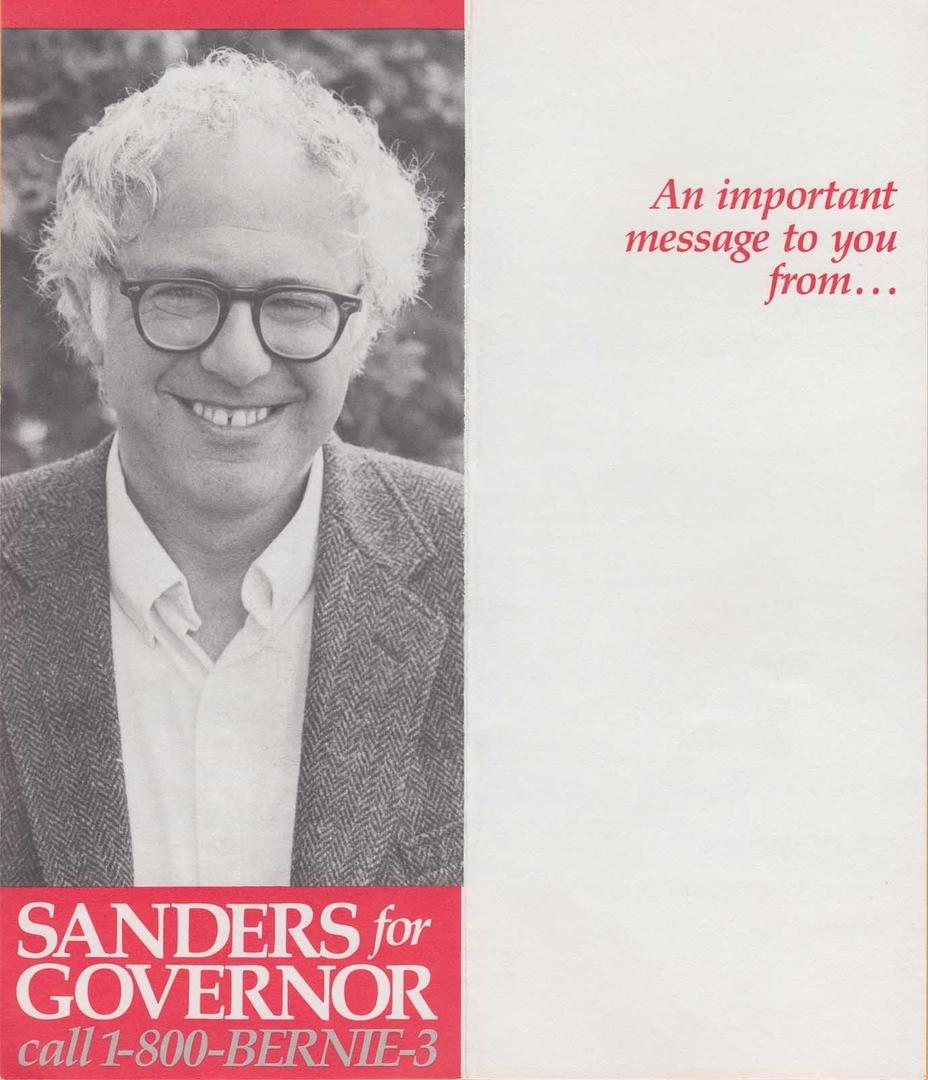
Front and back cover

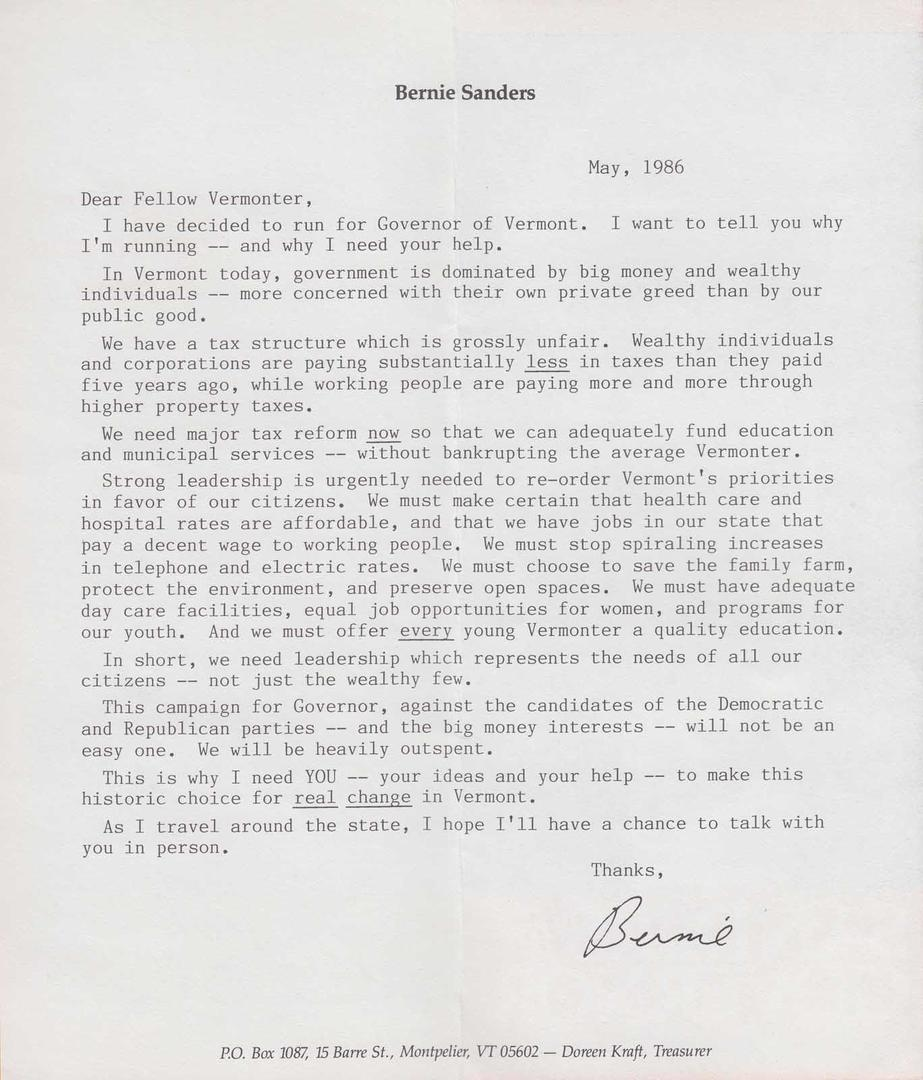
Inside

=== Candidates ===
- Madeleine M. Kunin (D), incumbent Governor of Vermont
- Peter Plympton Smith (R), Lieutenant Governor of Vermont
- Bernie Sanders (I), Mayor of Burlington, Vermont
- Richard F. Gottlieb (LU)

=== Results ===
1986 Vermont gubernatorial election
Party	Candidate	Votes	%	±%
Democratic	Madeleine M. Kunin (inc.)	92,485	47.01	−3.0
Republican	Peter Plympton Smith	75,239	38.25	−10.3
Independent	Bernie Sanders	28,418	14.45	+14.4
Liberty Union	Richard F. Gottlieb	491	0.25	−0.1
Write-in	Write-ins	83	0.04	n/a
Total votes		196,716	100	

After no candidate received a majority of the vote, the Vermont Legislature, consisting of 150 representatives and 30 senators, voted to decide the winner, per the state constitution.

Vermont legislature vote results
Party	Candidate	Votes	%
Democratic	Madeleine M. Kunin (inc.)	139	77.22
Republican	Peter Plympton Smith	39	21.66
Independent	Bernie Sanders	2	1.11
Total votes		180	100

== Works cited ==
- Doyle, William (1992). The Vermont Political Tradition: And Those Who Helped Make It. W. Doyle. ISBN 0961548614.
