= 1982 Vermont gubernatorial election =

- November 2, 1982
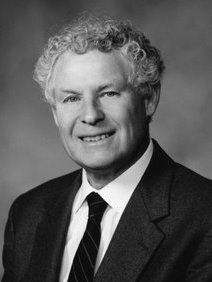

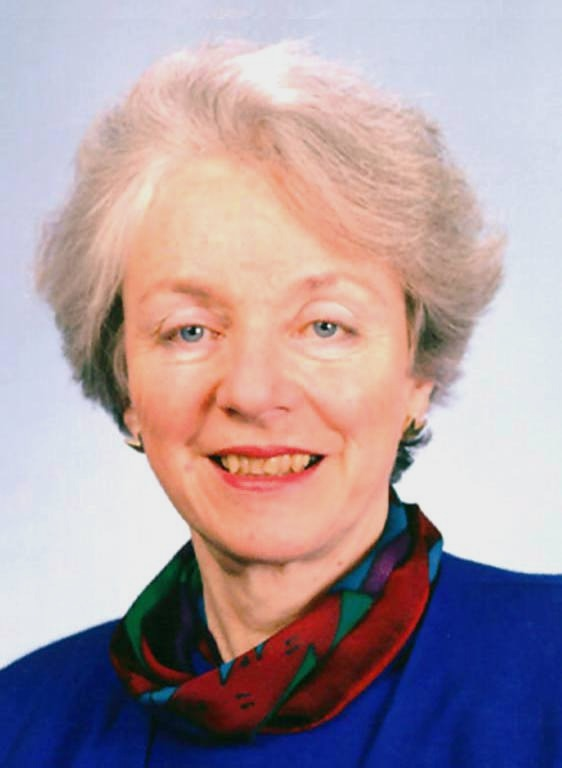
Nominee	Richard Snelling	Madeleine Kunin
Party	Republican	Democratic
Popular vote	93,111	74,394
Percentage	55.01%	43.96%
- Snelling: 40–50% 50–60% 60–70% 70–80% 80–90% Kunin: 40–50% 50–60% 60–70%
Governor before election
Richard Snelling
Republican
Elected Governor
Richard Snelling
Republican

The 1982 Vermont gubernatorial election took place on November 2, 1982. Incumbent Republican Richard A. Snelling ran successfully for a fourth term as Governor of Vermont, defeating Democratic candidate Madeleine Kunin.

== Republican primary ==
=== Results ===
Republican primary results
Party	Candidate	Votes	%	±%
Republican	Richard A. Snelling (inc.)	47,872	96.4	
Republican	Other	1,765	3.6	
Total votes		49,637	100.0	

== Democratic primary ==
=== Results ===
Democratic primary results
Party	Candidate	Votes	%	±%
Democratic	Madeleine Kunin	16,002	90.7	
Democratic	Clifford Thompson	1,433	8.1	
Democratic	Other	210	1.2	
Total votes		17,645	100.0	

== Liberty Union primary ==
=== Results ===
Liberty Union primary results
Party	Candidate	Votes	%	±%
Liberty Union	Richard F. Gottlieb	184	97.4	
Liberty Union	Other	5	2.6	
Total votes		189	100.0	

== Citizens primary ==
=== Results ===
Citizens primary results
Party	Candidate	Votes	%	±%
Citizens	Scattering	70	100.0	
Total votes		70	100.0	

== General election ==
=== Results ===
1982 Vermont gubernatorial election
Party	Candidate	Votes	%	±%
Republican	Richard A. Snelling (inc.)	93,111	55.01	
Democratic	Madeleine M. Kunin	74,394	43.96	
Liberty Union	Richard F. Gottlieb	850	0.50	
Libertarian	John L. Buttolph, III	801	0.47	
N/A	Other	95	0.06	
Total votes		169,251	100.0	
