= 1984 Vermont gubernatorial election =

- November 6, 1984
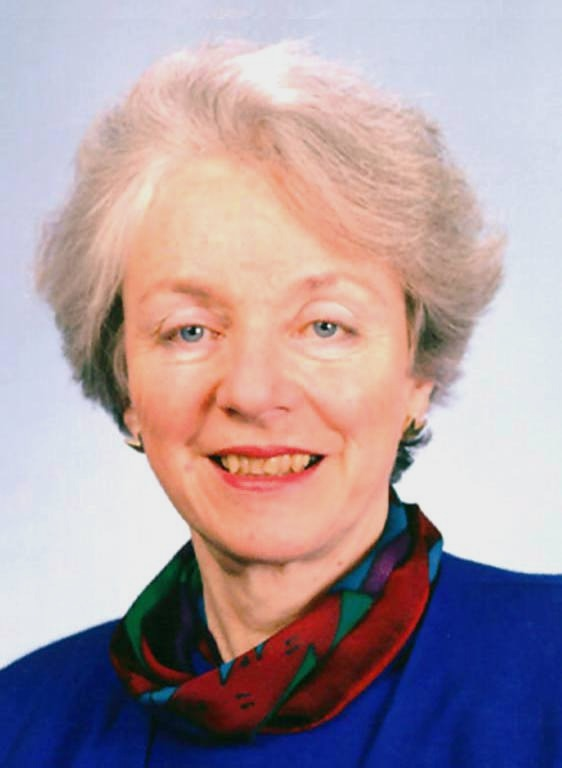

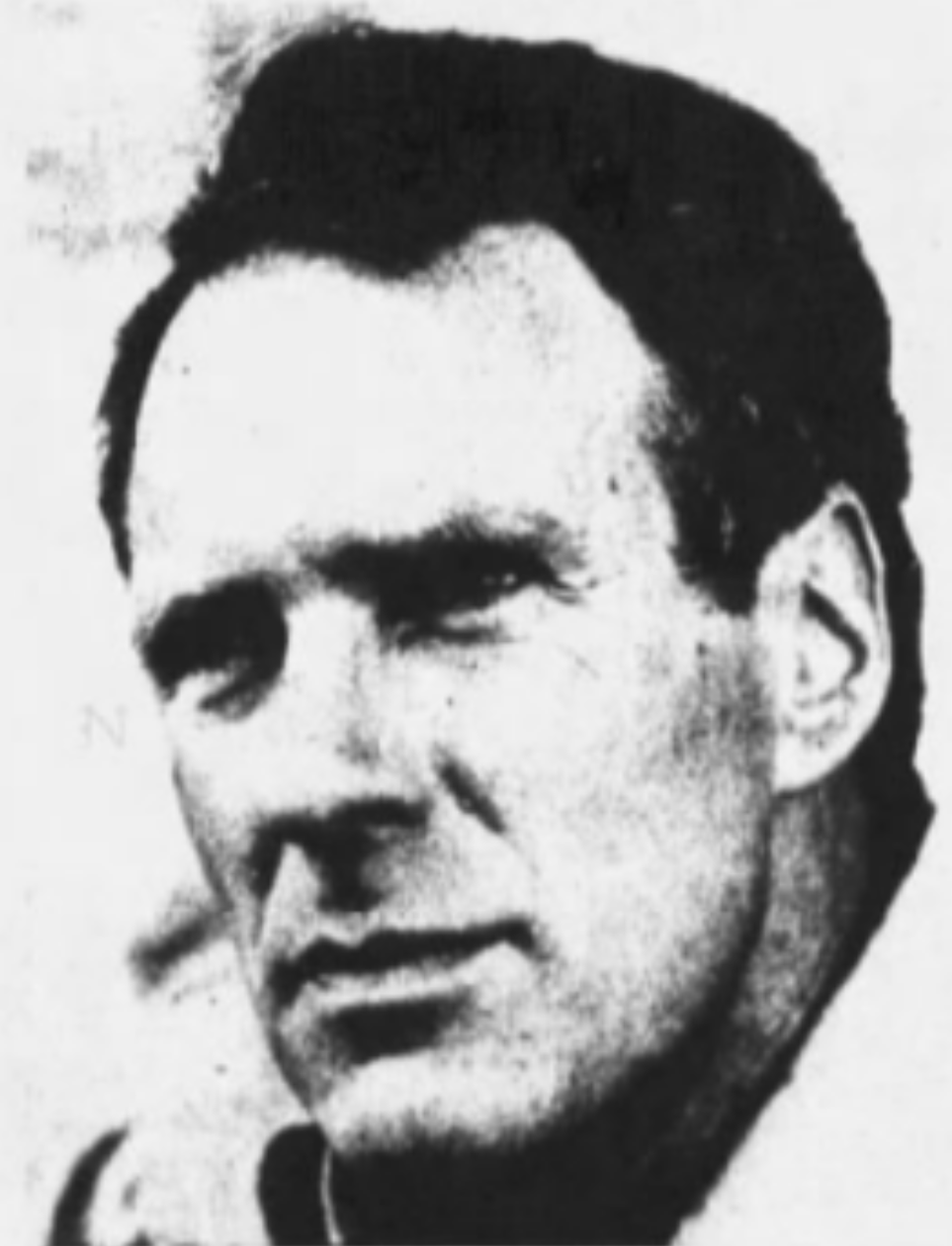
Nominee	Madeleine Kunin	John Easton Jr.
Party	Democratic	Republican
Popular vote	116,938	113,264
Percentage	50.03%	48.45%
- Kunin: 40–50% 50–60% 60–70% Easton: 40–50% 50–60% 60–70% 70–80% 80–90%
Governor before election
Richard Snelling
Republican
Elected Governor
Madeleine Kunin
Democratic

The 1984 Vermont gubernatorial election took place on November 6, 1984. Incumbent Republican Richard A. Snelling did not run for another term as Governor of Vermont. Democratic candidate Madeleine Kunin defeated Republican candidate John J. Easton Jr. to succeed him. Kunin's win coincided with the presidential election, which saw Republican Ronald Reagan win Vermont with nearly 58% of the vote.

== Republican primary ==
=== Candidates ===
- John J. Easton Jr., Vermont Attorney General since 1981
- Hilton Wick, Middlebury College trustee

=== Results ===
Republican primary results
Party	Candidate	Votes	%	±%
Republican	John J. Easton, Jr.	30,436	60.9	
Republican	Hilton Wick	19,170	38.3	
Republican	Other	382	0.8	
Total votes		49,988	100.0	

== Democratic primary ==
=== Results ===
Democratic primary results
Party	Candidate	Votes	%	±%
Democratic	Madeleine M. Kunin	17,236	97.9	
Democratic	Other	370	2.1	
Total votes		17,606	100.0	

== Liberty Union primary ==
=== Results ===
Liberty Union primary results
Party	Candidate	Votes	%	±%
Liberty Union	Richard F. Gottlieb	228	88.4	
Liberty Union	Other	30	11.6	
Total votes		258	100.0	

== General election ==
=== Results ===
1984 Vermont gubernatorial election
Party	Candidate	Votes	%	±%
Democratic	Madeleine M. Kunin	116,938	50.03	
Republican	John J. Easton, Jr.	113,264	48.45	
Libertarian	William Wicker	1,904	0.81	
Citizens	Marian Wagner	730	0.31	
Liberty Union	Richard F. Gottlieb	695	0.30	
N/A	Other	222	0.10	
Total votes		233,753	100.0	
