= Edgar May =

American politician from Vermont (1929–2012)

Edgar May (June 27, 1929 – December 27, 2012) was an American journalist and politician. He served in the Vermont House of Representatives 1973–1983 and the Vermont Senate 1983–1991 and he was the elder brother of three-term Vermont Governor Madeleine May Kunin.

== Life and career ==
May was born in Zürich, Switzerland, and moved to the United States in 1940. He was raised in New Jersey, graduating from high school in Princeton, and then worked as a clerk at The New York Times while studying at Columbia University.

During the Korean War, May served in the United States Army, assigned as a speechwriter for commanders and staff based at Fort Sheridan, Illinois. He graduated from Northwestern University with a degree in journalism in 1957.

May worked as a reporter for the Bellows Falls Times, Fitchburg Sentinel, and Buffalo Evening News. While at the Buffalo Evening News in 1960, he investigated the New York State welfare system, and won the annual Pulitzer Prize for Local Reporting, No Edition Time (a predecessor of the Investigative Reporting Prize), citing "his series of articles on New York State's public welfare services entitled, "Our Costly Dilemma", based in part on his three-month employment as a State case worker. The series brought about reforms that attracted nationwide attention." The series led to a book, The Wasted Americans: cost of our welfare dilemma, published by Harper & Row in 1964.

He worked in the Johnson administration, including assisting Sargent Shriver in operating the Peace Corps and as deputy director of the Domestic Peace Corps, which later became Volunteers in Service to America (VISTA).

May was a consultant for the Ford Foundation from 1970 to 1975, and wrote for Corrections Magazine.

A Democrat, he served in the Vermont House of Representatives from 1975 to 1983. He was a member of the Vermont Senate from 1983 to 1991, and was chairman of the Senate Appropriations Committee.

From 1993 to 1996 May was Chief Operating Officer of the Special Olympics.

In retirement May was active in several civic and municipal projects in his hometown, Springfield, Vermont.

== Death ==
May died on December 27, 2012, in Tucson, Arizona, aged 83, from complications of a stroke he had suffered three weeks earlier.
