= Madeleine Kunin =

American politician (born 1933)

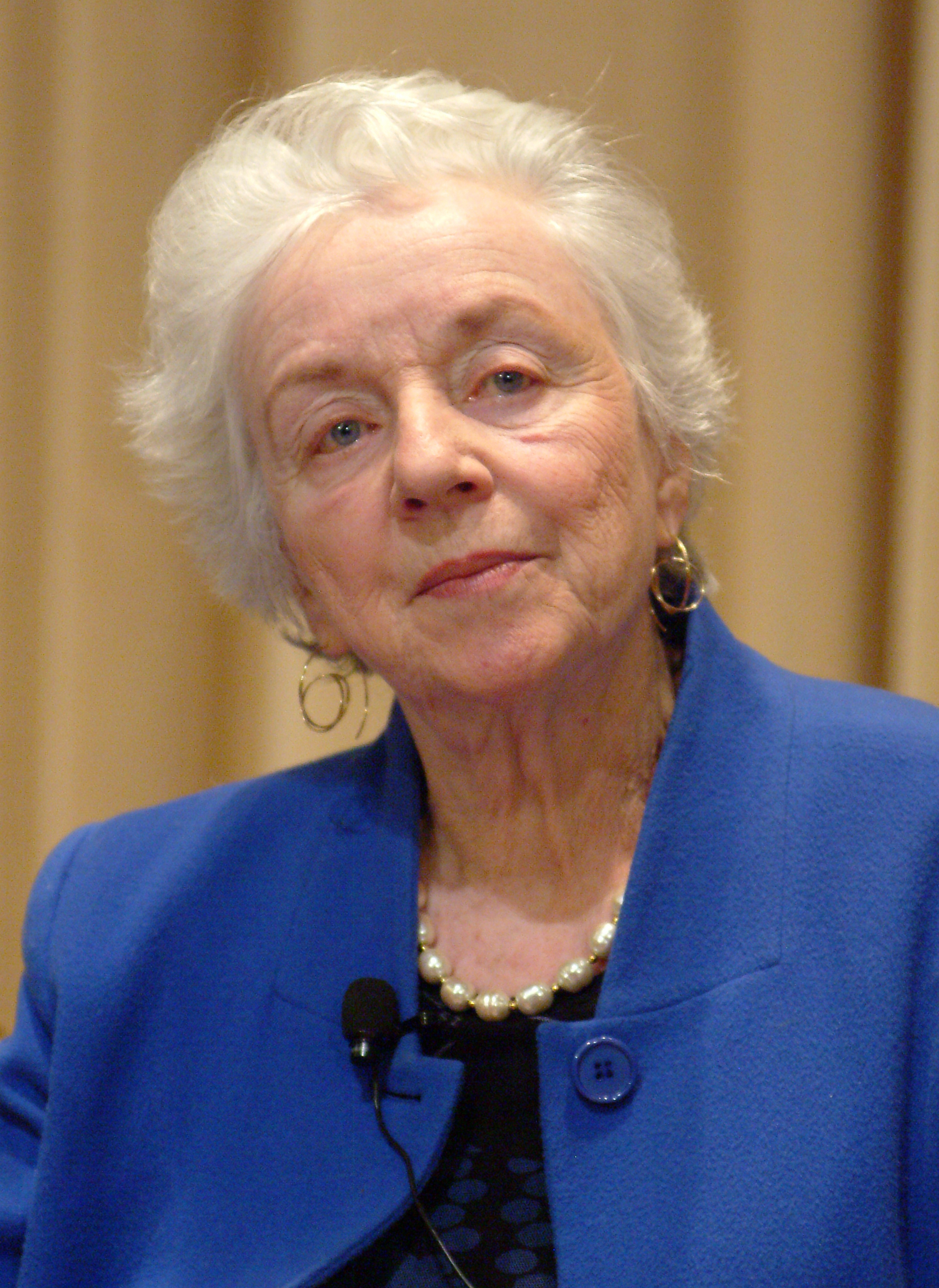

United States Ambassador to Liechtenstein
- In office March 14, 1997 – August 16, 1999
- President: Bill Clinton
- Preceded by: M. Larry Lawrence
- Succeeded by: J. Richard Fredericks

United States Ambassador to Switzerland
- In office August 19, 1996 – August 16, 1999
- President: Bill Clinton
- Preceded by: M. Larry Lawrence
- Succeeded by: J. Richard Fredericks

United States Deputy Secretary of Education
- In office 1993–1996
- President: Bill Clinton
- Preceded by: David T. Kearns
- Succeeded by: Marshall S. Smith

77th Governor of Vermont
- In office January 10, 1985 – January 10, 1991
- Lieutenant: Peter Smith; Howard Dean
- Preceded by: Richard A. Snelling
- Succeeded by: Richard A. Snelling

75th Lieutenant Governor of Vermont
- In office January 10, 1979 – January 10, 1983
- Governor: Richard A. Snelling
- Preceded by: T. Garry Buckley
- Succeeded by: Peter Smith

Member of the Vermont House of Representatives
- In office January 5, 1973 – January 5, 1979 Serving with Evelyn Jarrett (1973–1975); Mary Evelti (1975–1979)
- Preceded by: Evelyn Jarrett; George Little
- Succeeded by: Pamela Erkson; Mary Evelti
- Constituency: Chittenden 1-8 district (1973–1975); Chittenden 4-8 district (1975–1979)

Personal details
- Born: Madeleine May; September 28, 1933 (age 93) Zürich, Switzerland
- Party: Democratic
- Spouses: Arthur Kunin (m. 1959; div. 1995); John Hennessey (m. 2006; died 2018)
- Relations: Edgar May (brother)
- Education: University of Massachusetts, Amherst (BA); Columbia University (MA); University of Vermont (MA)

Madeleine Kunin (née May; born September 28, 1933) is a Swiss-born American diplomat, author, and politician. She served as the 77th governor of Vermont from 1985 until 1991, and as the United States ambassador to Switzerland from 1996 to 1999. She was Vermont's first and, to date, only female governor as well as the first Jewish governor of Vermont. She was also the first Jewish woman to be elected governor of a U.S. state. She is a member of the Democratic Party.

Kunin also served as the 75th lieutenant governor of Vermont from 1979 until 1983. She ran for governor in 1982, but lost to incumbent governor Richard Snelling.

Kunin was narrowly elected governor in 1984, won reelection in 1986, promptly after being elected by the Vermont General Assembly, and won a third term in 1988. In 1990, she did not seek reelection, and was succeeded by Snelling, who would serve for a little over seven months before he died in office. Since the death of Thomas P. Salmon on January 14, 2025, Kunin is the oldest living former governor of Vermont.

Since 2003, Kunin has been a James Marsh professor-at-large at the University of Vermont.

== Early life and education ==
Kunin was born September 28, 1933 in Zurich, Switzerland, the second of two children, to Ferdinand May (1887–1936), a merchant, and Renée May (née Bloch; 1898–1969), a school teacher, into a German Jewish family. Her older brother was Edgar May.

Her paternal family was originally from Geinsheim am Rhein (presently part of Trebur, Hesse) and her maternal family was Swiss Jewish originally from Endingen and Lengnau, Aargau. They escaped to Switzerland after the Nazi rise. Hence, Kunin grew up speaking Swiss German fluently. Kunin's father, Ferdinand May, suffered depression and died by suicide in a lake near Zurich.

She was raised in Zurich and briefly in Hergiswil on Lake Lucerne, where her mother believed they were safer in case of a Nazi invasion. In June 1940, the family ultimately emigrated to New York City. She received her bachelor's degree in history from the University of Massachusetts Amherst (1956), a master's degree from the Columbia University Graduate School of Journalism, and a master's degree in English from the University of Vermont.

== Career ==
Prior to seeking elective office, she worked as a journalist for The Burlington Free Press, as a tour guide at the World's Fair, and as a part-time college professor. She was also involved in community activities, particularly in the area of women's rights, children, and literature. In 2012 her book, The New Feminist Agenda: Defining the Next Revolution for Women, Work, and Family, was published by Chelsea Green Publishing.

=== Political career ===
In 1972, Kunin was defeated in her bid to join the Burlington Board of Aldermen. Later that year she was elected a Vermont State Representative, where in her first term she served as a member of the Government Operations Committee. Following her reelection in 1974, she was elected Minority Whip of the State House and appointed to the Appropriations Committee. After being elected to a third term in 1976, she was appointed Chairwoman of the Appropriations Committee, the first woman to assume this position. Kunin has written that when she served on the Appropriations Committee during his chairmanship, Emory A. Hebard, a conservative Republican who later served as Vermont State Treasurer, was a mentor, and gave her significant responsibilities despite her status as a member of the minority Democrats. When Hebard left the House, he successfully lobbied his former colleagues to name Kunin as chairwoman of the committee.

In 1978 she was elected to the first of two terms as the 75th Lieutenant Governor of Vermont. Serving with Republican Richard A. Snelling, Kunin primarily served as President of the State Senate and worked with citizens around the state. She produced various studies in areas such as energy and daycare and made policy recommendations to the Governor and Legislature. Kunin was a frequent speaker statewide during her time as lieutenant governor.

Kunin did not run for reelection as lieutenant governor in 1982, instead challenging Snelling for the governorship. She was unsuccessful, but in 1984 Snelling did not run for reelection, and Kunin was the successful Democratic nominee, defeating Republican John J. Easton Jr. to win the first of her three terms as governor.

In 1986 Kunin ran for her second term as governor. Her opponents were Republican Peter Plympton Smith and independent Bernie Sanders. Smith received 38 percent of the vote, Sanders 14 percent, and Kunin won with 47 percent of the vote.

Kunin is the first woman in U.S. history to have been elected governor of a U.S. state three times. As governor, she focused on the environment, education, and children's issues. She appointed the first woman to the Vermont Supreme Court and created her state's family court system. After rising unpopularity due to significant budget cuts and economic downturn within the State, Kunin declined to seek reelection in 1990.

Kunin was a member of the administration of President Bill Clinton, serving as deputy secretary of education of the United States from 1993 until 1997 when she became the ambassador to her native Switzerland, as well as to Liechtenstein. Prior to joining the Clinton Administration, she worked in Clinton's campaign as a member of the search committee for the vice presidential nominee and on the transition team. Switzerland-United States relations entered a tense phase during the World Jewish Congress lawsuit against Swiss banks starting in 1995. The U.S. federal government adopted a delicate policy of supporting the heirs of the Holocaust victims, while formally opposing sanctions against Switzerland. Ultimately, the Swiss banks agreed to a 1.25 billion dollar settlement with Holocaust survivors and their heirs in 1998. Furthermore, in the wake of the lawsuit, the Swiss government established steps to re-evaluate the role of Switzerland during World War II. One of the steps taken was the publication of the names of the owners of dormant accounts in Swiss banks, with the surprise result that Renee May, Kunin's mother deceased in 1970 was among the names.

== Personal life ==
In 1959, Kunin married Dr. Arthur S. Kunin (1925–2025), a physician, son of Elihu Kunin and Lena Kunin (née Perelman), of Brooklyn, New York. They had four children.

- Julia Madeleine Kunin (born 1961).
- Peter B. Kunin, a intellectual property lawyer, who is married to Lisa Kunin, formerly the executive assistant of Peter Shumlin, former Governor of Vermont from 2011–2017 and aid to former U.S. Senator James Jeffords.
- Adam W. Kunin, a cardiologist
- Daniel Kunin, who served as an advisor to the President of Georgia Mikheil Saakashvili in facilitating government dealings between his government and the White House.

In 1995, Kunin divorced her first husband and soon thereafter was appointed U.S. Ambassador to Switzerland and Liechtenstein in 1997. In 2006, she married John W. Hennessey Jr., a professor at Dartmouth College. Kunin is a dual citizen of the United States and Switzerland.

Kunin is the author of the books Coming of Age: My Journey to the Eighties (2018), The New Feminist Agenda: Defining the Next Revolution for Women, Work, and Family (2012), Pearls, Politics, and Power: How Women Can Win and Lead (2008) and Living a Political Life (1995) which chronicles her career prior to joining the U.S. Department of Education. She is a resident of Burlington, Vermont.

As of 2026, Kunin is a resident of Shelburne, Vermont.

== Awards and honors ==
Governor Kunin has received more than twenty honorary degrees.

In 1995, Kunin received the Foreign Language Advocacy Award from the Northeast Conference on the Teaching of Foreign Languages in recognition of her support for education, equal access for all children and equitable salaries for teachers.

== See also ==
- List of United States governors born outside the United States

Party political offices
Preceded by John Alden	Democratic nominee for Lieutenant Governor of Vermont; 1978, 1980	Succeeded by Thomas Ryan
Preceded by Jerome Diamond	Democratic nominee for Governor of Vermont; 1982, 1984, 1986, 1988	Succeeded by Peter Welch
Political offices
Preceded by Garry Buckley	Lieutenant Governor of Vermont; 1979–1983	Succeeded by Peter Smith
Preceded by Richard Snelling	Governor of Vermont; 1985–1991	Succeeded by Richard Snelling
Diplomatic posts
Preceded by Larry Lawrence	United States Ambassador to Switzerland; 1996–1999	Succeeded by Richard Fredericks
Preceded by Larry Lawrence	United States Ambassador to Liechtenstein; 1997–1999	Succeeded by Richard Fredericks
U.S. order of precedence (ceremonial)
Preceded by Martha McSally as Former U.S. Senator	Order of precedence of the United States; Within Vermont	Succeeded by Howard Dean as Former Governor
Preceded by Donald Carcieri as Former Governor	Order of precedence of the United States; Outside Vermont	Succeeded by Howard Dean as Former Governor
