= 1986 United States Senate election in Vermont =

- November 4, 1986
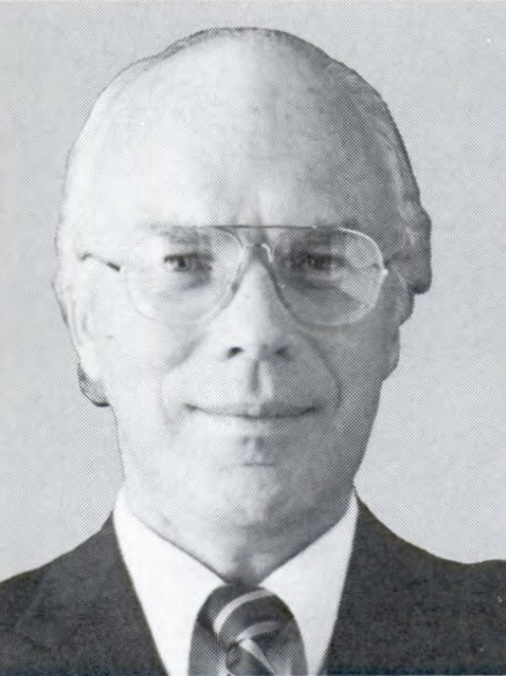

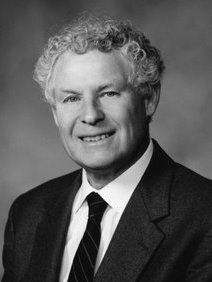
Nominee	Patrick Leahy	Richard Snelling
Party	Democratic	Republican
Popular vote	124,123	67,798
Percentage	63.16%	34.50%
- Leahy: 40–50% 50–60% 60–70% 70–80% Snelling: 40–50% 50–60% 60–70%
U.S. senator before election
Patrick Leahy
Democratic
Elected U.S. Senator
Patrick Leahy
Democratic

The 1986 United States Senate election in Vermont was held on November 4, 1986. Incumbent Democratic U.S. Senator Patrick Leahy won reelection to a third term, defeating Republican former governor Richard Snelling by a landslide margin of almost 30 points, in a race that was initially expected to be quite competitive, as Snelling was recruited to run by popular President Ronald Reagan.

== Democratic primary ==
=== Candidates ===
- Patrick Leahy, incumbent U.S. Senator

=== Results ===
Democratic primary results
Party	Candidate	Votes	%
Democratic	Patrick Leahy (incumbent)	21,255	97.63%
Democratic	Write-ins	516	2.37%
Total votes		21,771	100.00%

== Liberty Union primary ==
=== Candidates ===
- Jerry Levy, sociologist and perennial candidate

=== Results ===
Liberty Union primary results
Party	Candidate	Votes	%
Liberty Union	Jerry Levy	147	93.04%
Liberty Union	Write-ins	11	6.96%
Total votes		158	100.00%

== Republican primary ==
The popular former Governor of Vermont, Richard A. Snelling, had faced pressure from national Republicans to enter the race, but had spent the majority of 1985 convinced that he would not be a candidate. In October 1985, however, encouraged by figures such as New Mexico Senator Pete Domenici and President of the United States Ronald Reagan, Snelling changed his mind and entered the race, claiming that a lack of action over the United States national deficit had encouraged him to run.

=== Candidates ===
- Richard A. Snelling, former Governor of Vermont
- Anthony N. Doria, founder of the Vermont Law School and perennial candidate

=== Results ===
Republican primary results
Party	Candidate	Votes	%
Republican	Richard A. Snelling	21,477	75.11%
Republican	Anthony N. Doria	6,493	22.71%
Republican	Write-ins	625	2.19%
Total votes		28,595	100.00%

== General election ==
=== Campaign ===
Both Leahy and Snelling were well-respected and highly popular in Vermont, and the general feeling was that they would both make good Senators. However, Snelling was felt to be at a disadvantage for several reasons, including the fact that his main campaign plank was deficit reduction, which The Caledonian-Record noted Leahy was already a well-known advocate for, and the fact that Leahy had acquired a reputation as one of the Senate's most knowledgeable figures on the issue of nuclear proliferation, an issue which the Brattleboro Reformer noted Snelling had no experience with.

Snelling frequently attacked Leahy by calling him a "liberal" during the campaign, part of a broader strategy of negative campaigning against the incumbent.

=== Candidates ===
- Anthony Doria (C), perennial candidate
- Patrick Leahy (D), incumbent U.S. Senator
- Jerry Levy (LU), sociologist and perennial candidate
- Richard A. Snelling (R), former Governor of Vermont

=== Endorsements ===
Patrick Leahy (D)

State officials

- Tom Harkin, U.S. Senator from Iowa

Labor unions

- Vermont Nurses Association

Organizations

- Democratic Senate Campaign Committee
- Vermont Audubon Council
- Vermont Natural Resources Council
- Vermont Sierra Club
Richard Snelling (R)

Executive officials

- Ronald Reagan, President of the United States
- James Baker, U.S. Secretary of the Treasury

State officials

- John McClaughry, state senator

=== Results ===
General election results
Party	Candidate	Votes	%	±%
Democratic	Patrick Leahy (incumbent)	124,123	63.16%	+13.34%
Republican	Richard A. Snelling	67,798	34.50%	−14.00%
Conservative	Anthony N. Doria	2,963	1.51%	N/A
Liberty Union	Jerry Levy	1,583	0.81%	N/A
Write-in		65	0.02%	N/A
Total votes		196,532		
Democratic hold				

== See also ==
- 1986 United States Senate elections
