= John J. Easton Jr. =

American lawyer

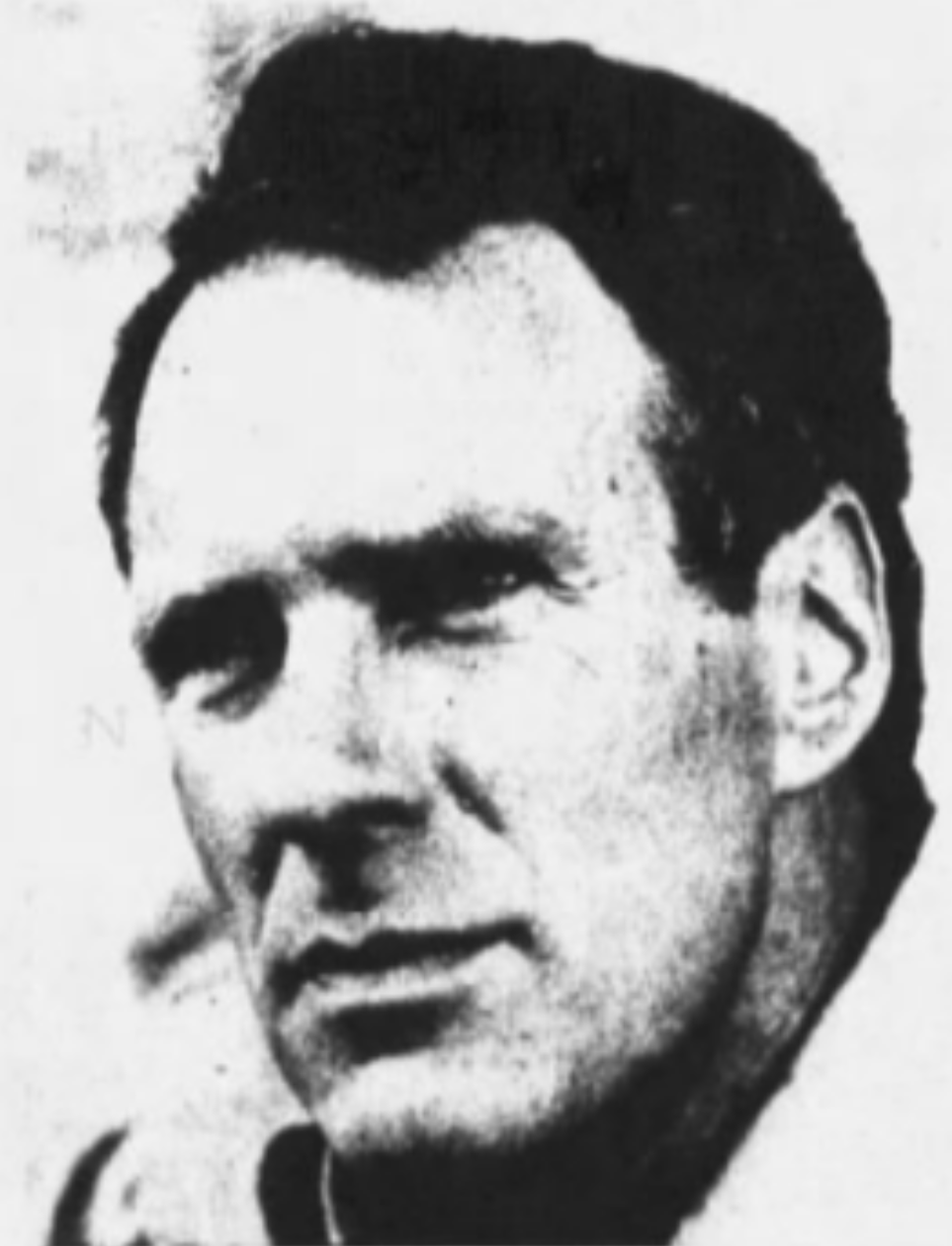
Easton in 1984

John J. Easton Jr. (born June 16, 1943) is an American attorney who served as Vermont Attorney General and in several senior positions with the United States Department of Energy.

== Biography ==
John Jay Easton Jr. was born in San Francisco, California on June 16, 1943. His father, Colonel John Jay Easton Sr. (August 26, 1919 – August 20, 1985) was a member of the West Point class of 1941 who was a career United States Air Force officer.

The younger Easton was raised in Virginia, Georgia, and Morocco. He graduated from the University of Colorado Boulder in 1964, and then served in the United States Air Force from 1964 to 1968. Easton graduated from the Georgetown University Law Center in 1970 and became an attorney in Vermont.

Easton practiced from 1970 to 1975. From 1975 to 1978 he was an assistant state attorney general and chief of the attorney general's consumer protection division. From 1978 to 1980 he was director of the division of rate setting for the Vermont Agency of Human Services.

In 1980 Easton ran successfully for Attorney General, and he served two terms, 1981 to 1985. In 1984 he was the Republican nominee for Governor of Vermont, and lost the general election to Madeleine M. Kunin.

After losing the election for Governor Easton continued to practice law in Vermont, and was a vice president of the consulting company Syn-Cronamics, Inc.

From 1989 to 1993 Easton held appointed positions at the United States Department of Energy, serving successively as Assistant Secretary for International Affairs and Energy Emergencies, General Counsel, and Assistant Secretary for Domestic and International Energy Policy.

Easton remained in the Washington, D.C. area after leaving the Energy department, and became Vice President for International Programs at the Edison Electric Institute (EEI).

== See also ==
- Vermont vs Hunt (1982)

== Sources ==
Party political offices
| Preceded by Dennis F. Bradley | Republican nominee for Vermont Attorney General; 1980, 1982 | Succeeded by Jeffrey Amestoy |
| Preceded by Richard A. Snelling | Republican nominee for Governor of Vermont; 1984 | Succeeded by Peter Plympton Smith |
Political offices
| Preceded by M. Jerome Diamond | Vermont Attorney General; 1981 – 1985 | Succeeded by Jeffrey L. Amestoy |
