= Richard A. Snelling =

American businessman and politician (1927–1991)

Richard Snelling
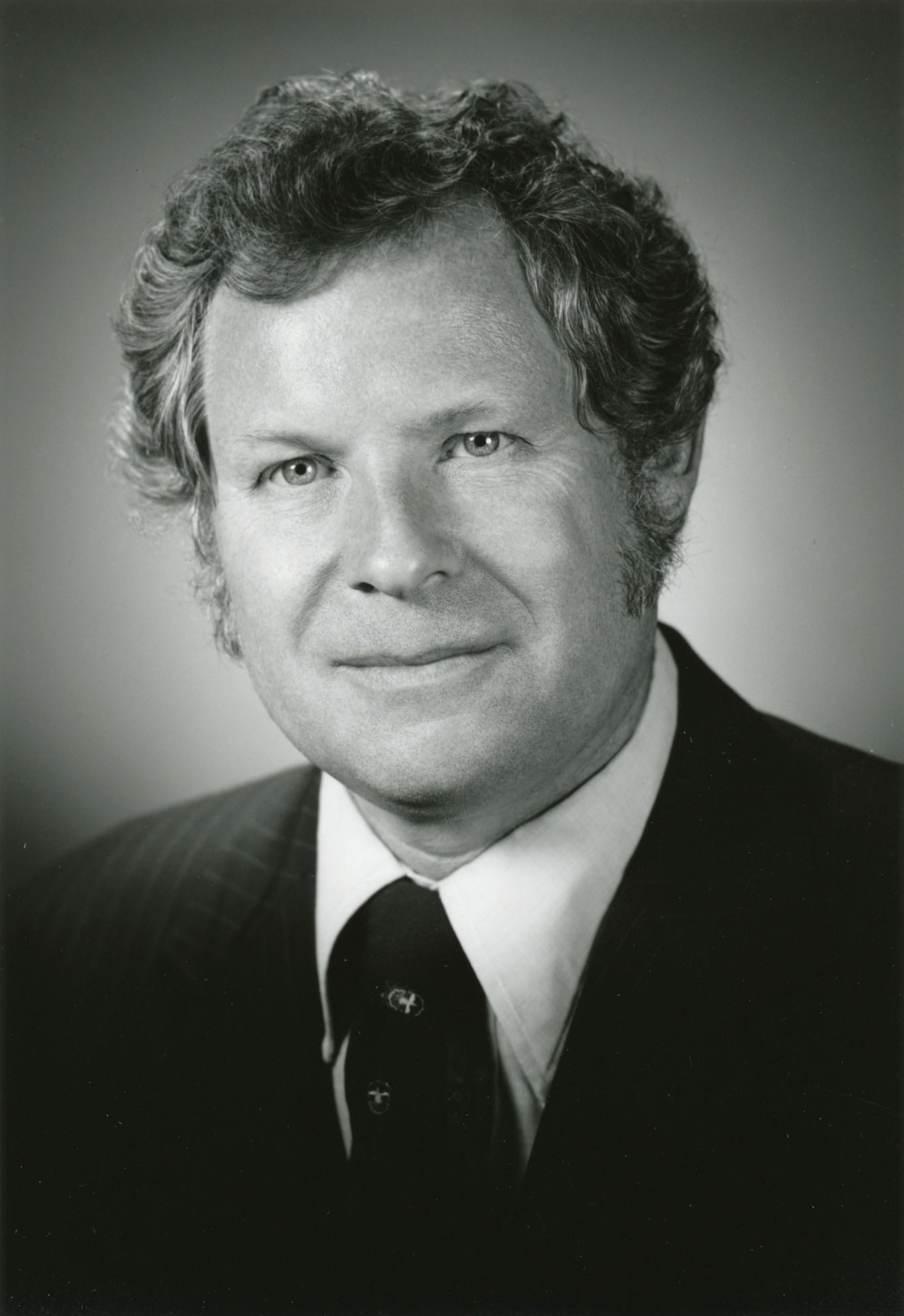
- Official portrait, c. 1980

76th and 78th Governor of Vermont
- In office January 10, 1991 – August 13, 1991
- Lieutenant: Howard Dean
- Preceded by: Madeleine Kunin
- Succeeded by: Howard Dean
- In office January 6, 1977 – January 10, 1985
- Lieutenant: Garry Buckley; Madeleine Kunin; Peter Smith
- Preceded by: Thomas P. Salmon
- Succeeded by: Madeleine Kunin

Chair of the National Governors Association
- In office August 11, 1981 – August 10, 1982
- Preceded by: George Busbee
- Succeeded by: Scott M. Matheson

Majority Leader of the Vermont House of Representatives
- In office 1975–1977
- Preceded by: Giles Dewey
- Succeeded by: Jim Douglas

Member of the Vermont House of Representatives
- In office 1973–1977 Serving with Howard Lunderville (1973–1975); David Curtis (1975–1977)
- Preceded by: Mary Thurber
- Succeeded by: Gretchen B. Morse; Sallie Soule
- Constituency: 30th district (1973–1975); 7th Chittenden (1975–1977)
- In office 1959–1961
- Preceded by: Derick V. Webb
- Succeeded by: Eustace Thomas
- Constituency: Shelburne, Vermont, U.S.

Personal details
- Born: Richard Arkwright Snelling; February 18, 1927 Allentown, Pennsylvania, U.S.
- Died: August 13, 1991 (aged 64) Shelburne, Vermont, U.S.
- Resting place: Shelburne Village Cemetery, Shelburne, Vermont, U.S.
- Party: Republican
- Spouse: Barbara Weil (m. 1947)
- Relations: Alice Lee Moqué (grandmother); Charles W. Hornor (great-grandfather)
- Children: 4, including Diane
- Parent(s): Walter O. Snelling; Helen Marjorie Gehrig
- Education: Harvard University (BA)

Military service
- Allegiance: United States
- Branch/service: US Army
- Years of service: 1945–1946
- Rank: Technician fifth grade
- Battles/wars: World War II; Occupation of Germany

Richard Arkwright Snelling (February 18, 1927 – August 13, 1991) was an American businessman, politician, and the 76th and 78th governor of Vermont from 1977 to 1985 and from January 10, 1991, until his death.

A native of Allentown, Pennsylvania, Snelling was educated in Allentown and served in the United States Army at the end of World War II and during the post-war occupation of Germany. He graduated from Harvard University in 1948 and embarked on a business career, working for companies in Massachusetts, Pennsylvania, and Vermont. After settling in Vermont, he founded Shelburne Industries, a maker of ski racks and other ski equipment. He became active in politics as a Republican, served a term in the Vermont House of Representatives (1959–1961), and ran unsuccessfully for Vermont Senate in 1956, lieutenant governor in 1964, and governor in 1966. In 1972, Snelling was again elected to the Vermont House. He was reelected in 1974, and served from 1973 to 1977. In his second term, Snelling was chosen to serve as majority leader.

In 1976, Snelling was the successful Republican nominee for governor. He was re-elected three times, and served from 1977 to 1985. In 1986, Snelling was the unsuccessful Republican nominee for the United States Senate and was defeated by incumbent Democrat Patrick Leahy. In 1990, he was the successful Republican nominee for governor. He was inaugurated in January 1991, and served until his death. Snelling's family was prominent in Vermont politics; his wife Barbara served as lieutenant governor and a member of the state senate. His daughter Diane succeeded her mother as a state senator. His son Mark was an unsuccessful candidate for lieutenant governor in 2010.

== Early life and education ==
Snelling was born in Allentown, Pennsylvania on February 18, 1927, the son of chemist Walter O. Snelling and Helen Marjorie Gahring.

He was educated in Allentown public schools and graduated from Allentown High School in 1944, completing the requirements six months ahead of his classmates as part of an accelerated program for young men intending to enter the military during World War II. During his high school years, Snelling was a member of the National Honor Society, and the school's track and field, swimming, and wrestling teams.

After graduating from Allentown High School, Snelling briefly attended the University of Havana in Havana, Cuba, and then Lehigh University in Bethlehem, Pennsylvania, before transferring to Harvard University. At Lehigh, Snelling played on the Lehigh University football and wrestling teams. While at Harvard, Snelling was on the dean's list, played on the varsity football team, was president of the Harvard Conservative League, and taught swimming and aquatic safety.

== Career ==
=== Military service ===
In October 1944, Snelling enlisted in the United States Army Air Corps Reserve. When the program was discontinued in early 1945, he transferred to the Army Enlisted Reserve Corps. In May 1945, Snelling entered Army active duty at the New Cumberland Defense Depot. He served at the end of World War II and in the post-war occupation of Germany, and carried out assignments as an investigator and information bulletin editor. He attained the rank of technician fifth grade and was discharged at Fort Dix, New Jersey in October 1946. He then returned to Harvard, where he received a bachelor's degree in government and economics in 1948. For several years after moving to Vermont, Snelling was active in the United States Coast Guard Auxiliary where he served as an officer. In 1956, Snelling was elected vice commander of Burlington Flotilla 802, and was appointed as the flotilla's inspector of facilities.

=== Business ===
After graduating from college, Snelling was employed at Joseph Breck & Sons, a Boston wholesaler of kitchen and garden supplies. Within a year, he had advanced from working in the company's warehouse to assistant to the company's president. He then moved to Philadelphia, where he led a venture to take over the bankrupt Henry A. Dreer, Inc., a retail and wholesale distributor of plants and seeds. Snelling, his management team, and the Dreer employees who remained soon restored the company to profitability. In 1953, Snelling moved to Vermont to take the position of assistant to the president of Colonial Motors, a Burlington car dealership. In 1955, Snelling became manager of Green Mountain Television Corporation, an early Cable television proponent, of which he became president.

A longtime resident of Shelburne, in 1957, Snelling founded Shelburne Industries, a maker of wire and metal products that later specialized in ski racks and other ski equipment. The venture proved successful and made Snelling a millionaire. In addition to heading Shelburne Industries, he served on the boards of directors for several other companies. His business affiliations include the Young Presidents' Association, the Chief Executives Organization, and the World Business Council. He was director of Ski Industries of America and Associated Industries of Vermont.

=== Political career ===
In 1956, Snelling ran unsuccessfully for a seat in the Vermont Senate. Snelling served in the Vermont House of Representatives from 1959 to 1961. He was a delegate to Republican National Conventions in 1960, 1968, 1980. In addition, Snelling served as chair of the Chittenden County Republican Committee and a member of Vermont Republican State Executive Committee from 1963 to 1966.

Snelling was the unsuccessful Republican nominee for lieutenant governor in 1964, and for governor in 1966. In 1972, he was again elected to the Vermont House, and he served from 1973 to 1977. During his final term, Snelling was the House's majority leader.

=== Governorship ===
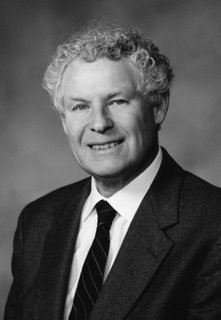
Snelling, c. 1986

In the 1976 Vermont gubernatorial election, Snelling was elected governor. He was re-elected three times, in 1978, 1980, and 1982, and served until January 1985. During his governorship, Snelling worked to protect the environment by opposing a plan to allow uranium mining in Vermont and barring the sale of phosphate detergents, arguing that they pollute water by increasing algae growth. He was also commended for using his business experience to promote economic growth by attracting industry to the state. Snelling advocated for the New Federalism of President Ronald Reagan because Snelling believed that government worked best when it remained close to the people. However, Snelling objected when Reagan's plan to turn several federal programs over to the states did not include federal financing and imposed budget cuts on the states.

Snelling was not a candidate for reelection in 1984. In 1986, he was the Republican nominee for U.S. Senate and lost to incumbent Patrick Leahy. After leaving office, Snelling took over active management of his business and financial interests. In addition, he sailed frequently on a yacht he purchased after leaving the governorship. Snelling traveled extensively, including a 1989 trip to Kenya.

=== Return to governorship ===
In 1990, Snelling ran again for governor, intending to use his business acumen and previous gubernatorial service to address state fiscal problems caused by the post-Reagan economic recession. He won a fifth two-year term, and devoted most of his effort to balancing the state budget and restoring its financial health. As recounted by Ralph G. Wright, the Democrat then serving as Speaker of the House, at the beginning of his term, Snelling took the unprecedented step of visiting the speaker's office unannounced to ask for a meeting with Wright so they could craft budget cuts and tax increases to address the budget deficit. The Vermont General Assembly responded to Snelling's initiative by negotiating and enacting the largest tax increase in Vermont's history, more than $90 million, while also imposing deep cuts in state programs.

== Personal life ==
On June 14, 1947, at age 20, he married 19-year-old Barbara Weil. They had four children, Jacqueline, Mark, Andrew, and Diane.

After Snelling's death, his wife served as Vermont's lieutenant governor and state senator.

His daughter Diane B. Snelling served in the Vermont Senate after being appointed to succeed her mother in 2002. She resigned in 2016 to accept appointment as head of the Vermont Natural Resources Board.

Snelling's son Mark was an unsuccessful candidate for the 2010 Republican nomination for lieutenant governor.

== Death and legacy ==
Snelling died of a heart attack at his home in Shelburne, Vermont on August 13, 1991. He was succeeded by Howard Dean. Snelling was interred at Shelburne Village Cemetery.

The Snelling Center for Government at the University of Vermont was named in honor of Richard and Barbara Snelling.

Party political offices
Preceded by Ralph A. Foote	Republican nominee for Lieutenant Governor of Vermont; 1964	Succeeded by Perry H. Merrill
Preceded by Ralph A. Foote	Republican nominee for Governor of Vermont; 1966	Succeeded by Deane C. Davis
Preceded by Walter L. Kennedy	Republican nominee for Governor of Vermont; 1976, 1978, 1980, 1982	Succeeded by John Easton
Preceded by Stewart Ledbetter	Republican nominee for U.S. Senator from Vermont (Class 3); 1986	Succeeded by Jim Douglas
Preceded by Michael Bernhardt	Republican nominee Governor of Vermont; 1990	Succeeded by John McClaughry
Preceded by Otis R. Bowen	Chair of the Republican Governors Association; 1979–1980	Succeeded by John N. Dalton
Political offices
Preceded by Thomas P. Salmon	Governor of Vermont; 1977–1985	Succeeded by Madeleine Kunin
Preceded by Madeleine Kunin	Governor of Vermont; 1991	Succeeded by Howard Dean
Preceded by George Busbee	Chair of the National Governors Association; 1981–1982	Succeeded by Scott M. Matheson
