= Cris Ericson =

American activist and perennial candidate

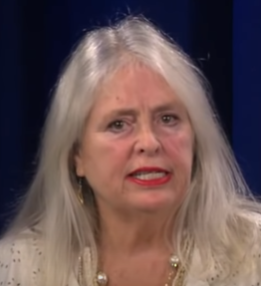
- Ericson in a 2018 gubernatorial debate

Personal details
- Born: May 16, 1952 (age 74) Washington, D.C., U.S.
- Party: Independent (2006, 2008, 2014, 2018, 2022)
- Other political affiliations: Make Marijuana Legal (2002); Marijuana (2004); Republican (2006); U.S. Marijuana Party (2010, 2012); Democratic (2016); Progressive (2020)
- Education: University of Massachusetts Amherst

Cris Ericson (born May 16, 1952) is an American marijuana legalization activist and perennial candidate for public office in Vermont. She has unsuccessfully run for the governorship of Vermont nine times and for a seat in the United States Congress eight times.

== Early life ==
Cris Ericson was born in Washington, D.C., on May 16, 1952. From 1970 to 1971, she attended Goddard College. In 1976, she graduated from the University of Massachusetts Amherst with a bachelor of arts degree.

== Career ==
=== Vermont elections ===
During the 2002 Vermont gubernatorial election Ericson was one of four independent candidates and ran under the Make Marijuana Legal party line. In the general election she placed fourth behind Jim Douglas, Doug Racine, and Cornelius Hogan.

During the 2004 Vermont gubernatorial election she ran as an independent under the Marijuana party line. In the general election she placed third behind Douglas and Peter Clavelle.

She ran for governor of Vermont in 2006, 2008, 2010, 2012, 2014, and 2018.

In 2020, she ran for the gubernatorial, lieutenant gubernatorial, attorney general, treasurer, secretary of state, and auditor nominations of the Vermont Progressive Party. The Vermont Progressive Party sought volunteers to run in the primaries and for party members to write-in David Zuckerman in the gubernatorial primary and Doug Hoffer in the auditor general primary to prevent Ericson from winning. She was able to appear on the ballot due to lower ballot access requirements instituted due to COVID-19. She was defeated by Zuckerman, who won as a write-in candidate, in the gubernatorial primary. However, she won the Progressive nominations for lieutenant governor, auditor, secretary of state, attorney general, and treasurer. Ericson called for a recount in the gubernatorial primary.

=== United States Congress ===
During the 2004 United States Senate election in Vermont Ericson ran under the Marijuana party line and placed third behind Patrick Leahy and John A. McMullen.

During the 2006 United States Senate election in Vermont she ran for the Republican nomination, but was defeated by Richard Tarrant. In the general election she ran as an independent and placed third behind Bernie Sanders and Tarrant.

== Electoral history ==
Cris Ericson electoral history

2002 Vermont gubernatorial election
Party	Candidate	Votes	%
Republican	Jim Douglas	103,436	44.94%
Democratic	Doug Racine	97,565	42.39%
Independent	Cornelius Hogan	22,353	9.71%
Marijuana	Cris Ericson	1,737	0.76%
Progressive	Michael J. Badamo	1,380	0.60%
Libertarian	Joel W. Williams	938	0.41%
Grassroots	Patricia Hejny	771	0.34%
Restore Justice-Freedom	Marilynn Christian	638	0.28%
Liberty Union	Peter Diamondstone	625	0.27%
Independent	Brian Pearl	569	0.25%
Write-in		149	0.07%
Total votes		230,161	100.00%

2004 Vermont gubernatorial election
Party	Candidate	Votes	%
Republican	Jim Douglas (incumbent)	181,540	58.74%
Democratic	Peter Clavelle	117,327	37.96%
Marijuana	Cris Ericson	4,221	1.37%
Independent	Patricia Hejny	2,431	0.79%
Libertarian	Harland Arthur Macia III	2,263	0.73%
Liberty Union	Peter Diamondstone	1,298	0.42%
Write-in		205	0.07%
Total votes		309,285	100.00%

2004 United States Senate election in Vermont
Party	Candidate	Votes	%
Democratic	Patrick Leahy (incumbent)	216,972	70.63%
Republican	Jack McMullen	75,398	24.54%
Marijuana	Cris Ericson	6,486	2.11%
Green	Craig Hill	3,999	1.30%
Libertarian	Keith Stern	3,300	1.07%
Liberty Union	Ben Mitchell	879	0.29%
Write-in		174	0.06%
Total votes		307,208	100.00%

2006 United States Senate election in Vermont
Primary election
Party	Candidate	Votes	%
Republican	Richard Tarrant	22,008	61.84%
Republican	Greg Parke	10,479	29.44%
Republican	Cris Ericson	1,722	4.84%
Write-in		1,382	3.88%
Total votes		35,591	100.00%
General election
Independent	Bernie Sanders	171,638	65.41%
Republican	Richard Tarrant	84,924	32.36%
Independent	Cris Ericson	1,735	0.66%
Green	Craig Hill	1,536	0.59%
Anti-Bushist Candidate	Peter Moss	1,518	0.58%
Liberty Union	Peter Diamondstone	801	0.31%
Write-in		267	0.10%
Total votes		262,419	100.00%

2008 Vermont gubernatorial election
Party	Candidate	Votes	%
Republican	Jim Douglas (incumbent)	170,492	53.43%
Independent	Anthony Pollina	69,791	21.87%
Democratic	Gaye Symington	69,534	21.79%
Cheap Renewable Energy	Tony O'Connor	3,106	0.97%
Independent	Sam Young	2,490	0.78%
Liberty Union	Peter Diamondstone	1,710	0.54%
Independent	Cris Ericson	1,704	0.53%
Write-in		258	0.08%
Total votes		319,085	100.00%

2008 United States House of Representatives election in Vermont
Party	Candidate	Votes	%
Democratic	Peter Welch (incumbent) (Note: In this election, Welch also received the nomination of the Republican Party.)	248,203	83.25%
Independent	Mike Bethel	14,349	4.81%
Energy Independence	Jerry Trudell	10,818	3.63%
Progressive	Thomas James Hermann	9,081	3.05%
Independent	Cris Ericson	7,841	2.63%
Liberty Union	Jane Newton	5,307	1.78%
Write-in		2,552	0.86%
Total votes		298,151	100.00%

2010 United States Senate election in Vermont
Party	Candidate	Votes	%
Democratic	Patrick Leahy (incumbent)	151,281	64.98%
Republican	Len Britton	72,699	31.23%
Independent	Daniel Freilich	3,544	1.52%
Marijuana	Cris Ericson	2,731	1.17%
Independent	Stephen J. Cain	2,356	1.01%
Liberty Union	Peter Diamondstone	1,433	0.62%
Independent	Johenry Nunes	1,021	0.44%
Write-in		113	0.05%
Total votes		232,822	100.00%
	Blanks	8,608	

2010 Vermont gubernatorial election
Party	Candidate	Votes	%
Democratic	Peter Shumlin	119,543	49.48%
Republican	Brian E. Dubie	115,212	47.69%
Independent	Dennis Steele	1,917	0.79%
Marijuana	Cris Ericson	1,819	0.75%
Independent	Dan Feliciano	1,341	0.56%
Independent	Emily Peyton	684	0.28%
Liberty Union	Ben Mitchell	429	0.18%
Write-in		660	0.27%
Total votes		241,605	100.00%
	Blanks	2,170	

2012 United States Senate election in Vermont
Party	Candidate	Votes	%
Independent	Bernie Sanders (incumbent)	209,053	71.04%
Republican	John MacGovern	73,198	24.87%
Marijuana	Cris Ericson	5,924	2.01%
Liberty Union	Peter Diamondstone	2,511	0.85%
Peace and Prosperity	Peter Moss	2,452	0.83%
VoteKISS	Laurel LaFramboise	877	0.30%
Write-in		252	0.09%
Total votes		294,267	100.00%
	Blanks	6,513	

2012 Vermont gubernatorial election
Party	Candidate	Votes	%
Democratic	Peter Shumlin	170,749	57.80%
Republican	Randy Brock	110,940	37.55%
Independent	Emily Peyton	5,868	1.99%
Marijuana	Cris Ericson	5,583	1.89%
Liberty Union	Dave Eagle	1,303	0.44%
Write-in		969	0.33%
Total votes		295,412	100.00%
	Blanks	8,107	

2014 Vermont gubernatorial election
Party	Candidate	Votes	%
Democratic	Peter Shumlin (incumbent)	89,509	46.36%
Republican	Scott Milne	87,075	45.10%
Libertarian	Dan Feliciano	8,428	4.37%
Independent	Em Peyton	3,157	1.64%
Liberty Union	Peter Diamondstone	1,673	0.87%
Independent	Bernard Peters	1,434	0.74%
Independent	Cris Ericson	1,089	0.56%
Write-in		722	0.37%
Total votes		193,087	100.00%
	Blanks	2,984	

2014 United States House of Representatives election in Vermont
Party	Candidate	Votes	%
Democratic	Peter Welch (incumbent)	123,349	64.41%
Republican	Mark Donka	59,432	31.03%
Independent	Cris Ericson	2,750	1.44%
Liberty Union	Matthew Andrews	2,071	1.08%
Energy Independence	Jerry Trudell	2,024	1.06%
Independent	Randall Meyer	1,685	0.88%
Write-in		193	0.10%
Total votes		191,504	100.00%
	Blanks	4,221	

2016 United States Senate election in Vermont
Primary election
Party	Candidate	Votes	%
Democratic	Patrick Leahy (incumbent)	62,249	88.59%
Democratic	Cris Ericson	7,596	10.81%
Write-in		424	0.60%
Total votes		70,269	100.00%
	Blanks/Spoiled	2,893	
General election
Democratic	Patrick Leahy (incumbent)	192,243	61.26%
Republican	Scott Milne	103,637	33.03%
Marijuana	Cris Ericson	9,156	2.92%
Independent	Jerry Trudell	5,223	1.66%
Liberty Union	Peter Diamondstone	3,241	1.03%
Write-in		309	0.10%
Total votes		313,809	100.00%
	Blanks/Spoiled	6,658	

2016 Vermont gubernatorial Democratic primary
Party	Candidate	Votes	%
Democratic	Sue Minter	36,046	50.35%
Democratic	Matt Dunne	26,706	37.30%
Democratic	Peter Galbraith	6,611	9.23%
Democratic	Cris Ericson	537	0.75%
Democratic	H. Brooke Paige	361	0.50%
Write-in		1,328	1.86%
Total votes		71,589	100.00%
	Blanks/Spoiled	1,573	

2018 Vermont gubernatorial election
Party	Candidate	Votes	%
Republican	Phil Scott (incumbent)	151,261	55.19%
Democratic	Christine Hallquist	110,335	40.26%
Independent	Trevor Barlow	3,266	1.19%
Independent	Charles E. Laramie	2,287	0.83%
Independent	Cris Ericson	2,129	0.78%
Earth Rights	Stephen Marx	1,855	0.68%
Liberty Union	Emily Peyton	1,839	0.67%
Write-in		1,115	0.41%
Total votes		274,087	100.00%
	Blanks/Spoiled	4,143	

2018 United States House of Representatives election in Vermont
Party	Candidate	Votes	%
Democratic	Peter Welch (incumbent)	188,547	69.20%
Republican	Anya Tynio	70,705	25.95%
Independent	Cris Ericson	9,110	3.34%
Liberty Union	Laura S. Potter	3,924	1.44%
Write-in		165	0.06%
Total votes		272,451	100.00%
	Blanks/Spoiled	5,779	

2020 Vermont Attorney General election
Primary election
Party	Candidate	Votes	%
Progressive	Cris Ericson	414	58.06%
Write-in		299	42.94%
Total votes		713	100.00%
	Blanks/Spoiled	228	
General election
Democratic	T.J. Donovan (incumbent)	234,081	67.75%
Republican	H. Brooke Paige	94,892	27.46%
Progressive	Cris Ericson	15,846	4.59%
Write-in		711	0.21%
Total votes		345,530	100.00%
	Blanks/Spoiled	25,453	

2020 Vermont State Treasurer election
Primary election
Party	Candidate	Votes	%
Progressive	Cris Ericson	411	58.05%
Progressive	Beth Pearce (incumbent) (write-in)	99	13.98%
Write-in		198	27.97%
Total votes		708	100.00%
	Blanks/Spoiled	233	
General election
Democratic	Beth Pearce (incumbent)	197,255	57.37%
Republican	Carolyn Whitney Branagan	114,177	33.36%
Independent	Alex Wright	17,939	5.22%
Progressive	Cris Ericson	14,142	4.11%
Write-in		341	0.10%
Total votes		343,854	100.00%
	Blanks/Spoiled	27,123	

2020 Vermont Secretary of State election
Primary election
Party	Candidate	Votes	%
Progressive	Cris Ericson	406	57.26%
Progressive	Jim Condos (incumbent) (write-in)	106	14.95%
Write-in		197	27.79%
Total votes		709	100.00%
	Blanks/Spoiled	232	
General election
Democratic	Jim Condos (incumbent)	214,666	61.88%
Republican	H. Brooke Paige	99,564	28.70%
Independent	Pamala Smith	21,210	6.11%
Progressive	Cris Ericson	11,171	3.22%
Write-in		309	0.09%
Total votes		346,920	100.00%
	Blanks/Spoiled	24,048	

2020 Vermont Lieutenant Governor election
Primary election
Party	Candidate	Votes	%
Progressive	Cris Ericson	438	57.48%
Progressive	David Zuckerman (incumbent) (write-in)	7	0.92%
Write-in		317	41.60%
Total votes		762	100.00%
	Blanks/Spoiled	179	
General election
Democratic	Molly Gray	182,820	51.32%
Republican	Scott Milne	157,065	44.09%
Progressive	Cris Ericson	7,862	2.21%
Independent	Wayne Billado, III	5,101	1.43%
Banish The F35s	Ralph Corbo	2,289	0.64%
Independent	David Zuckerman (incumbent) (write-in)	83	0.02%
Write-in		1,014	0.28%
Total votes		356,234	100.00%
	Blanks/Spoiled	14,734	

2020 Vermont State Auditor election
Primary election
Party	Candidate	Votes	%
Progressive	Cris Ericson	410	56.40%
Write-in		314	43.60%
Total votes		727	100.00%
	Blanks/Spoiled	217	
General election
Democratic	Doug Hoffer (incumbent) (Note: In this election, Hoffer also received the nomination of the Republican Party.)	266,445	84.04%
Progressive	Cris Ericson	48,731	15.37%
Write-in		1,880	0.59%
Total votes		317,056	100.00%
	Blanks/Spoiled	53,926	

2020 United States House of Representatives Progressive primary
Party	Candidate	Votes	%
Progressive	Chris Brimmer	469	58.04%
Progressive	Cris Ericson	236	29.21%
Progressive	Peter Welch (incumbent) (write-in)	75	9.28%
Write-in		28	3.47%
Total votes		808	100.00%
	Blanks/Spoiled	133	

2020 Vermont gubernatorial Progressive primary
Party	Candidate	Votes	%
Progressive	David Zuckerman (write-in)	273	32.62%
Progressive	Cris Ericson	254	30.35%
Progressive	Boots Wardinski	239	28.55%
Write-in		71	8.48%
Total votes		837	100.00%
	Blanks/Spoiled	104	

2022 United States Senate election in Vermont
Party	Candidate	Votes	%
Democratic	Peter Welch	196,575	68.47%
Republican	Gerald Malloy	80,468	28.03%
Independent	Dawn Marie Ellis	2,752	0.96%
Green Mountain	Natasha Diamondstone-Kohout	1,574	0.55%
Independent	Kerry Patrick Raheb	1,532	0.53%
Independent	Mark Coester	1,273	0.44%
Independent	Stephen Duke	1,209	0.42%
Independent	Cris Ericson	1,105	0.38%
Write-in		612	0.21%
Total votes		287,099	100.00%
	Blank/Spoiled	4,855	

== Notes ==
Party political offices
Preceded by David Zuckerman	Progressive nominee for Lieutenant Governor of Vermont; 2020	Succeeded by David Zuckerman
