= 2014 Vermont gubernatorial election =

- November 4, 2014
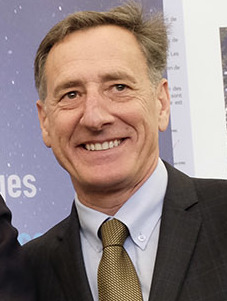

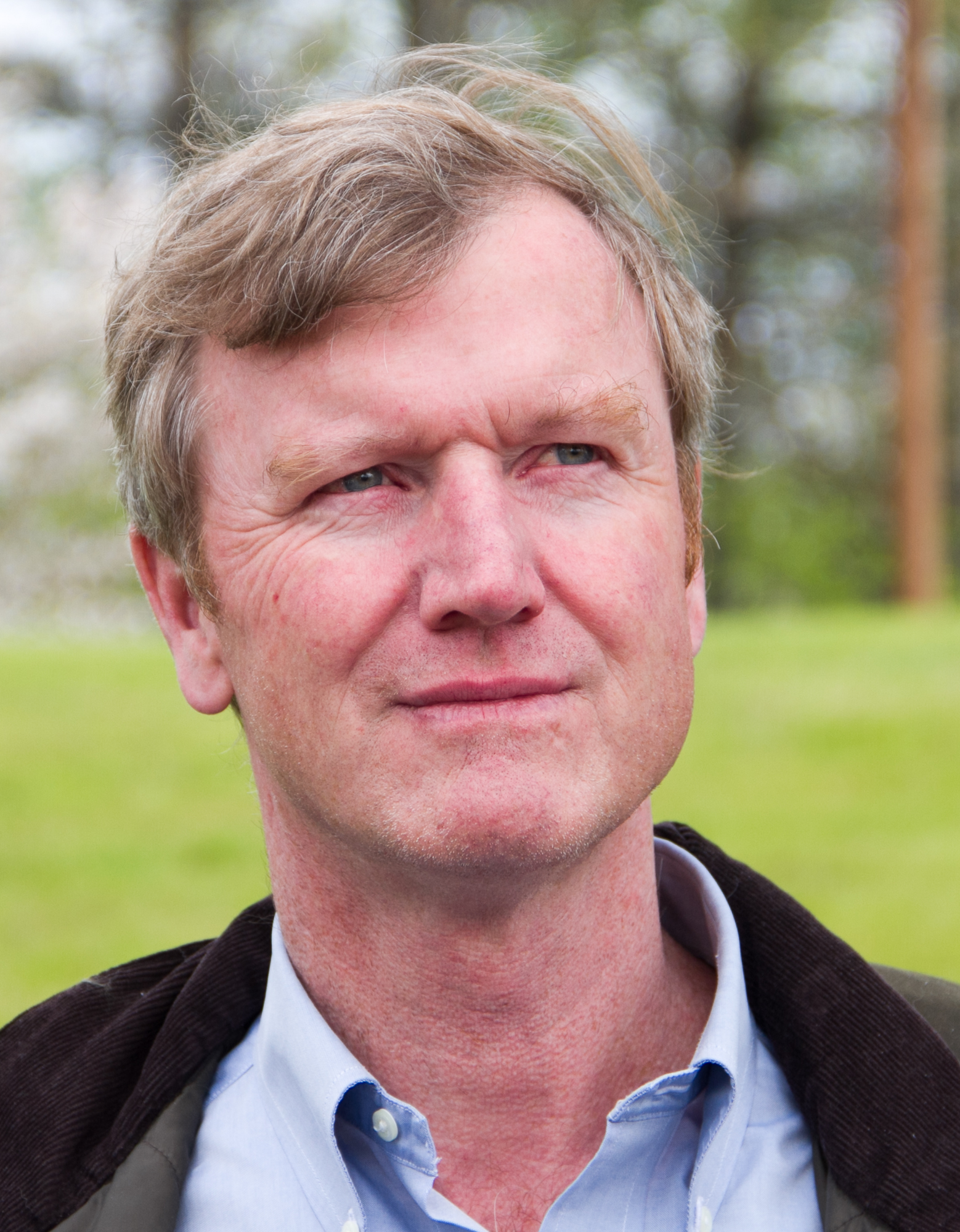
Nominee	Peter Shumlin	Scott Milne
Party	Democratic	Republican
Electoral vote	110	69
Popular vote	89,509	87,075
Percentage	46.36%	45.10%
- Shumlin: 40–50% 50–60% 60–70% 70–80% 80–90% Milne: 40–50% 50–60% 60–70% 70–80% 80–90% Tie: 40–50% No votes
Governor before election
Peter Shumlin
Democratic
Elected Governor
Peter Shumlin
Democratic

The 2014 Vermont gubernatorial election took place on November 4, 2014, to elect the governor of Vermont, concurrently with elections to the United States Senate in other states, elections to the United States House of Representatives, and various state and local elections. Incumbent Democratic governor Peter Shumlin ran for reelection to a third term in office against Republican businessman Scott Milne, Libertarian businessman Dan Feliciano and several other minor party and independent candidates.

Based on election polling, Shumlin's large financial advantage and the state's strong Democratic lean in presidential elections, Shumlin was expected to win easily, but he received only a plurality, not a majority, of the vote and polled only 2,434 votes more than Milne out of 193,087 cast. The Constitution of Vermont requires that the 180-member Vermont General Assembly choose the winner when no candidate receives over 50% of the popular vote. As a result, on January 8, 2015, the Assembly chose Shumlin over Milne by a vote of 110 to 69, with one abstention.

The result of the election prompted much debate and analysis amongst commentators and the political parties. The 2014 U.S. elections saw Republicans make sweeping gains in federal, state, and local offices across the country, and Republicans won gubernatorial victories in the Democratic-leaning Northeastern states of Maryland and Massachusetts. With a margin of 1.3%, this election was the second-closest race of the 2014 gubernatorial election cycle, behind only the election in Florida. As of 2026, this was also the last time a Democrat won the governorship of Vermont.

== Background ==
Four-term Republican governor Jim Douglas did not run for reelection in 2010. In the race to succeed him, Democratic nominee Peter Shumlin, the president pro tempore of the Vermont Senate, received 49.5% of the vote while Republican nominee Lieutenant Governor Brian Dubie received 47.7%. As neither candidate received a majority, the General Assembly was required to pick the winner in January 2011. Dubie did not contest the vote; he conceded the race on election night and called for Vermont to "unite" around Shumlin. Shumlin won the Assembly vote 145 to 28, with seven legislators not voting.

Shumlin was reelected in 2012 against Republican state senator and former Vermont Auditor of Accounts Randy Brock by a landslide, 57.8% to 37.6%. Vermont and New Hampshire are the only states in the country whose governors are elected every two years. An incumbent governor of Vermont had not been defeated for reelection since 1962, when Democrat Philip H. Hoff beat Republican F. Ray Keyser, Jr. by 1,315 votes.

== Democratic primary ==
Shumlin announced in December 2013 that he was running for reelection to a third term in office, but said that he would not begin campaigning until after Labor Day 2014, just two months before the election. He faced one opponent in the Democratic primary on August 26: lifelong Republican and Washington, D.C. resident H. Brooke Paige, who simultaneously ran against Democratic incumbent William Sorrell in the Democratic primary election for Vermont attorney general. Paige was also unsuccessful in that effort, losing by 80% to 20%.

=== Candidates ===
==== Nominee ====
- Peter Shumlin, incumbent governor

==== Eliminated in primary ====
- H. Brooke Paige, former CEO of Remington News Service and Republican candidate for the U.S. Senate in 2012 (also ran for attorney general)

=== Results ===
Democratic primary results
Party	Candidate	Votes	%
Democratic	Peter Shumlin (incumbent)	15,260	76.96%
Democratic	H. Brooke Paige	3,199	16.13%
Democratic	Write-in	1,369	6.9%
Total votes		19,828	100%

== Republican primary ==
The Republicans initially struggled to recruit a candidate. Former governor Douglas and Lieutenant Governor Phil Scott announced early on that they would not run, and it was not until March 2014 that a candidate entered the race: marijuana legalization activist and former Independent gubernatorial candidate Emily Peyton. This spurred Republicans to recruit a serious candidate, but they struggled to do so. Former Wall Street banker Bruce Lisman announced in May 2014 that he was not running, and attention turned to former state senator and 2012 nominee Randy Brock, State Representative Heidi Scheuermann and businessman Scott Milne.

In May, Scheuermann said that she would not run, leaving the party with a month until the June 12 filing deadline to find a candidate. Milne, who was traveling in Africa, announced that he would decide shortly before the deadline. Brock was urged to run and considered doing so, but revealed on June 8 that he would not. On the morning of filing deadline day, Milne announced that he would run. He was joined in the Republican primary by Peyton and retired marketer and self-described "modern-day Mark Twain" Steve Berry. Also running but not appearing on the ballot was Dan Feliciano, who ran as a write-in candidate for the Republican nomination and was uncontested for the Libertarian nomination. In the August 26 primary, Milne was nominated with over 70% of the vote.

=== Candidates ===
==== Nominee ====
- Scott Milne, businessman, candidate for the state house in 2006 and son of former state legislators Don and Marion Milne

==== Eliminated in primary ====
- Steve Berry, retired marketer
- Dan Feliciano, businessman and independent candidate for governor in 2010 (write-in; also ran as a Libertarian)
- Emily Peyton, independent candidate for governor in 2010 and 2012 (also ran as an independent)

==== Declined ====
- Randy Brock, former state senator, former Vermont Auditor of Accounts and nominee for governor in 2012
- Jim Douglas, former governor
- Bruce Lisman, banker
- Heidi Scheuermann, state representative
- Phil Scott, lieutenant governor of Vermont (ran for re-election)

=== Results ===
Republican primary results
Party	Candidate	Votes	%
Republican	Scott Milne	11,486	71.74%
Republican	Steve Berry	1,106	6.91%
Republican	Emily Peyton	1,060	6.62%
Republican	Brian Sarandon	981	6.12%
Republican	Write-in	2,358	14.73%
Total votes		16,010	100.00%

== Progressive primary ==
Satisfied with his support for single-payer health care and his efforts to close Vermont Yankee Nuclear Power Plant, the Vermont Progressive Party had not run a candidate against Shumlin in 2010 or 2012. Its members discussed challenging him in 2014 because of his proposed cuts to social programs, but the party openly admitted that it lacked the money for a gubernatorial campaign, and no candidate came forward to run.

=== Candidates ===
==== Declined ====
- Martha Abbott, former party chair
- Emma Mulvaney-Stanak, party chair and former Burlington City Councilor
- Anthony Pollina, nominee for governor in 2000 and 2008, state senator and former party chair

=== Results ===
Progressive primary results
Party	Candidate	Votes	%
Progressive	Write-in	114	100.00%

== Liberty Union primary ==
Peter Diamondstone, who co-founded the Liberty Union Party and had run for elected office almost two dozen times, was unopposed.

=== Candidates ===
==== Declared ====
- Peter Diamondstone, party co-founder and perennial candidate

=== Results ===
Liberty Union primary results
Party	Candidate	Votes	%
Liberty Union	Peter Diamondstone	133	89.26%
Liberty Union	Write-in	16	10.74%
Total votes		149	100%

== Libertarian nomination ==
Feliciano, a businessman who also ran as a write-in candidate in the Republican primary, was unopposed for the Libertarian nomination.

=== Candidates ===
==== Declared ====
- Dan Feliciano, businessman and independent candidate for governor in 2010 (also ran as a write-in in the Republican primary)

== Independent ==
=== Candidates ===
==== Declared ====
- Cris Ericson, perennial candidate (also ran for Vermont's at-large congressional district)
- Bernard Peters
- Emily Peyton, independent candidate for governor in 2010 and 2012 (also ran in the Republican primary)

==== Declined ====
- Bruce Lisman, banker

== General election ==
=== Debates ===
A general election debate, attended by party nominees Shumlin, Milne, Diamondstone and Feliciano and Independent candidates Ericson, Peters and Peyton, was held on October 9. It attracted considerable media attention and was described variously as "funny", "strange", "crazy", "one of the strangest of this election cycle", "very, very special" and "beard-filled". Comments by all of the candidates apart from Shumlin drew media attention and laughter from the studio audience, such as Milne describing himself as "third-generation, born in Vermont", only to correct himself and state that he was born in Brooklyn; Ericson, who sported a large bow-topped hat, suggesting that poor Vermonters use their food stamps to buy lottery tickets and decrying "chemtrails"; Diamondstone, who wore jean shorts with suspenders and long socks and sported a large beard, calling for revolutionary socialism, the legalisation of all drugs and secession from the union, as well as comparing students to "slaves" because of the cost of higher education and responding to a question about the Department of Children and Families by railing against the U.S. military and the "Zionist regime"; Peters answering a question about the affordability of college in Vermont by saying that he had "no idea"; and self-described "light worker" Peyton shouting at Shumlin for allegedly closing highway restrooms and using her closing remarks to ask Vermonters if they'd rather choose money or love.

Additional debates among the candidates were held, which also drew attention. Former governor Howard Dean described the debates as a "good thing for the state" and Time magazine's Denver Nicks called them a "breath of fresh air" and "pure entertainment". There was a final debate on October 29 with just the top three candidates: Shumlin, Milne and Feliciano.

=== Predictions ===
Source	Ranking	As of
The Cook Political Report	Solid D	November 3, 2014
Sabato's Crystal Ball	Safe D	November 3, 2014
Rothenberg Political Report	Safe D	November 3, 2014
Real Clear Politics	Likely D	November 3, 2014

=== Polling ===
Poll source	Date(s) administered	Sample size	Margin of error	Peter Shumlin (D)	Scott Milne (R)	Emily Peyton (I)	Other	Undecided
CBS News/NYT/YouGov	October 16–23, 2014	329	± 8%	47%	35%	2%	2%	13%
CBS News/NYT/YouGov	September 20–October 1, 2014	328	± 6%	46%	29%	11%	2%	12%
CBS News/NYT/YouGov	August 18–September 2, 2014	430	± 6%	45%	35%	2%	3%	15%
Rasmussen Reports	August 28–29, 2014	700	± 4%	48%	36%	—	7%	9%
CBS News/NYT/YouGov	July 5–24, 2014	512	± ?	52%	27%	15%	0%	6%

=== Results ===

2014 Vermont gubernatorial election
Party	Candidate	Votes	%	±%
Democratic	Peter Shumlin (incumbent)	89,509	46.36%	−11.44%
Republican	Scott Milne	87,075	45.10%	+7.55%
Libertarian	Dan Feliciano	8,428	4.36%	N/A
Independent	Emily Peyton	3,157	1.64%	−0.35%
Liberty Union	Peter Diamondstone	1,673	0.87%	+0.43%
Independent	Bernard Peters	1,434	0.74%	N/A
Independent	Cris Ericson	1,089	0.56%	N/A
Write-in		722	0.37%	+0.04%
Total votes		193,087	100.00%	N/A

==== By county ====
County	Peter Shumlin Democratic		Scott Milne Republican		Various candidates Other parties	
County	#	%	#	%	#	%
Addison	6,025	46.6%	5,765	44.6%	1,130	8.7%
Bennington	6,207	55.5%	4,180	37.4%	801	7.2%
Caledonia	3,137	35.1%	4,962	55.6%	830	9.3%
Chittenden	23,753	50.4%	18,988	40.3%	4,383	9.3%
Essex	524	31.9%	967	58.9%	152	9.3%
Franklin	4,850	36.2%	7,353	54.8%	1,208	9.0%
Grand Isle	1,196	40.5%	1,490	50.5%	267	9.1%
Lamoille	3,207	41.5%	3,810	49.3%	713	9.2%
Orange	4,329	45.7%	4,532	47.8%	620	5.5%
Orleans	2,448	31.2%	4,521	57.6%'	877	11.1%
Rutland	7,210	37.8%	10,289	54.0%	1,556	8.1%
Washington	9,190	45.0%	9,290	45.5%	1,925	9.5%
Windham	7,829	62.1%	3,776	30.0%	998	7.9%
Windsor	9,604	54.0%	7,152	40.2%	1,043	5.8%
Totals	89,509	46.4%	87,075	45.1%	16,503	8.5%

Counties that flipped from Democratic to Republican

- Grand Isle (largest municipality: Alburgh)
- Lamoille (largest municipality: Morristown)
- Orange (largest city: Randolph)
- Rutland (largest municipality: Rutland)
- Washington (largest municipality: Barre)

==== By municipality and district ====
Of Vermont's 275 "polling places" that report results separately—corresponding to the state's 255 towns and cities, with some larger municipalities broken into multiple precincts—Milne won a plurality in 162 precincts, or 58.9%. Shumlin won 112, or 40.7%, and they were tied in one other. Shumlin won the state's biggest voting area, Burlington (representing 9,604 gubernatorial voters), by a margin of 66% to 23%. Of the state's 10 largest municipalities, Shumlin also won South Burlington, Bennington, Montpelier, Hartford and Middlebury. Milne won Essex, Colchester, Rutland City, Williston and Barre Town. Of Vermont's 13 multi-member Senate districts, aligning roughly with the state's 14 counties, Milne won eight (61.5%) and Shumlin five (38.5%). Milne won the popular vote in 53 House districts; Shumlin won in 51.

== General Assembly vote ==
Since 1853, the General Assembly has selected the first-place finisher in every gubernatorial election that has come before it, most recently in 2010, when Shumlin received 49.5% of the vote and was chosen over Republican Brian Dubie, and in 2002, when the Democratic-controlled legislature picked Republican Jim Douglas, who had received 44.9%, over Democrat Doug Racine, who received 42.4%. The Assembly most recently reversed a plurality vote in the 1976 lieutenant gubernatorial election, when the Republican-controlled legislature picked Republican T. Garry Buckley rather than Democrat John Alden, who was suspected, and later convicted, of insurance fraud.

Although the second-place finisher usually concedes the race, as happened in 2002 and 2010, Milne refused to concede. He considered requesting a recount, but did not do so, reasoning that it was "extremely unlikely, almost unfathomable, that a recount would put either candidate above the 50 percent mark." Before the election, Milne said that if Shumlin won a plurality, he would support him and would expect Shumlin to do the same if the situation were reversed. After the election, however, he said, "it's clear that 54% of Vermonters want a new governor, and a new path forward."

As 91 votes are needed to elect the governor from the 180-member body and Democrats and Progressives held 112 seats, it was considered unlikely that Milne would win. Milne argued that legislators should decide the election in line with how their individual districts voted. Neal Goswami of the Vermont Press Bureau calculated that if each legislator voted according to the results in their district, the vote would result in a 90–90 tie. Milne disagreed with this calculation and claimed voting according to district outcome would result in his winning 93–87.

The fact is that fewer people voted for Scott Milne than voted for Peter Shumlin. Milne did not get a majority, either. I just don't think he has a case to be made that a majority, or even a plurality of voters, want him to be governor. I don't think that I will probably have to persuade [other legislators of this], quite frankly.

— State House Speaker Shap Smith, whose district voted for Milne, explaining why he would vote for Shumlin

Republican legislative leaders said that they would not whip their members to vote for Shumlin, leaving them free to vote their consciences. Though Republican lieutenant governor Phil Scott did not have a vote, he said that he would vote for Shumlin, and Republican state representative Kurt Wright said that he would do so. Initially, no Democrats indicated that they would vote for Milne. Indeed, several Democrats whose districts voted for Milne over Shumlin said that they would vote for Shumlin, citing his plurality win.

For almost a month, Milne made no further comment as he considered whether to lobby for legislators' votes. Former governor Douglas cautioned Milne against waging a legislative campaign for governor, saying that it was "unlikely" to be an effective strategy and that Milne should seek to preserve the "good will that he has accrued" and "acknowledge the result and come back and fight another day."

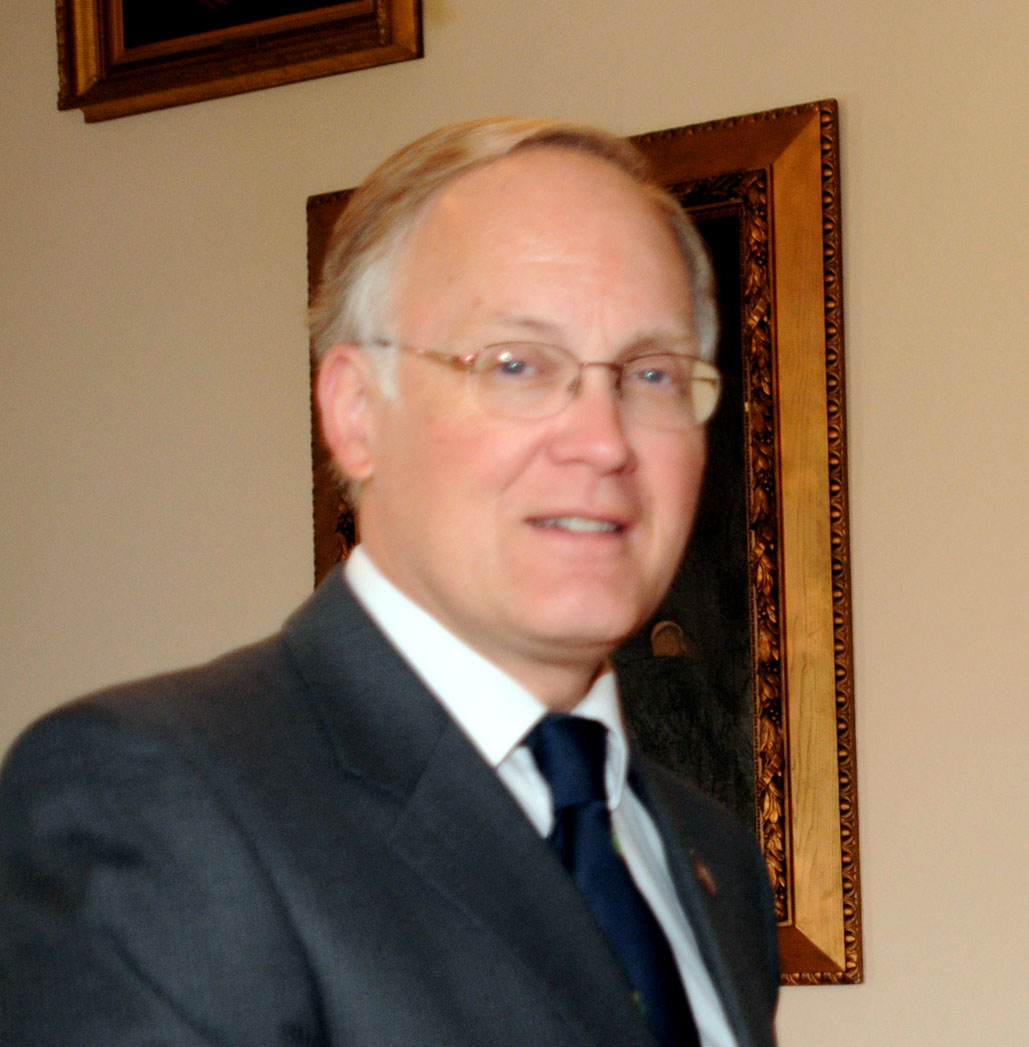
Former Republican Governor Jim Douglas, who urged Milne not to campaign for votes in the General Assembly

On December 8, Milne held a press conference in which he defied suggestions that he would concede by officially announcing that he was asking state legislators to vote for him. He went on to say that he would not be "pro-actively" trying to convince legislators to vote for him, nor would he start "twisting arms", but that his "door is open" and called on legislators to "consider the record of the incumbent" and what was "best" for Vermont. Shumlin responded that he was "honored to have received the most votes in this election and would not want to serve as governor if I did not." He went on to say that he believed that "the Legislature will honor the long democratic tradition of electing the candidate who received the most votes."

After Milne's announcement, Independent State Representative Paul Poirier, a liberal whose district voted for Milne by a 2-to-1 margin, announced that he would vote for Milne. One Democrat, State Representative Jim Condon, said that he would vote for Milne, also citing his district's support for Milne over Shumlin. Political science professors Eric Davis and Garrison Nelson and House Minority Leader Don Turner expected the General Assembly vote to roughly follow party lines, with Milne receiving about one-third of the votes, including most of the Republicans and a few Democrats and Independents.

On December 17, Shumlin announced that he was dropping his plan to implement single-payer healthcare. The reforms, which required business and personal tax increases, had never advanced beyond the framework stage. Shumlin, who had missed two earlier financing deadlines, said that "this is not the right time" because the federal government had offered less funding than expected and "the potential economic disruption and risks would be too great to small businesses, working families and the state's economy." The media also cited controversy surrounding comments made by economist Jonathan Gruber, who was involved in crafting and advocating for the plan, and Shumlin's failure to win a majority in the election as reasons for the cancellation. The decision, which Shumlin called the "biggest disappointment" of his career, drew a mixed response. Business groups lauded his "pragmatic" move but supporters of health care reform organized protests and said that it would end his political career.

At the end of December, the newly formed group "Vermonters for Honest Government" raised $30,000 to air television advertisements aimed at pressuring legislators to vote for Milne. The group's founder, retired United States Navy Captain Bill Round, said that legislators should vote against Shumlin because "he's promised a lot and failed to deliver." Round did not reveal the source of the group's funding. Milne said that while he had no connection to the group, he appreciated the sentiment. By contrast, Shumlin said that he would "absolutely not" run any advertisements, nor would he campaign for legislators' votes or spend any money. He added that he was "not worried" about the vote.

In early January, Milne reiterated that he was not actively campaigning for legislators' votes but said that he felt that his odds of victory were "getting better on a weekly basis, if not a daily basis." Shumlin said that if Milne were to win, Vermont would be "paralyzed", as the new administration lacked the time needed to assemble a new staff and draft a budget for the 2016 fiscal year. He also offered his support for amending the state constitution so that as long as a plurality winner received at least 40% of the vote, the Assembly would not be required to decide the election.

On January 8, the General Assembly voted to reelect Shumlin by 110 votes to 69, with one legislator not voting. Shumlin stated that he was "grateful for the opportunity to continue serving this state I love. I expect this will be a productive session addressing the issues Vermonters care about so deeply." Milne said that it was "a good day for Vermont ... I was happy to be a part of it. I think the road that's led us here has a lot of people feeling like one person can make a difference." Milne did not rule out running again in 2016, although he later declined and instead ran for the United States Senate, losing to incumbent Patrick Leahy by almost 30 points.

=== Results ===
2014 Vermont gubernatorial election, Vermont General Assembly vote
Party	Candidate	Votes	%
Democratic	Peter Shumlin (incumbent)	110	61.45%
Republican	Scott Milne	69	38.55%
Libertarian	Dan Feliciano	0	0.00%
Total votes		179 of 180	100.00%
Democratic hold			

== Analysis ==
As no candidate received a majority of the vote, the Vermont General Assembly was required to decide the election, choosing among the top three vote-getters, Shumlin, Milne and Feliciano. The result came as a surprise to most observers, who had expected Shumlin to win easily. RealClearPolitics rated the race "Likely Democratic" and The Cook Political Report, Daily Kos Elections, Governing, The Rothenberg Political Report and Sabato's Crystal Ball all rated the race "Safe Democratic". RealClearPolitics reported an average lead in the polls of 15.2% for Shumlin and HuffPost Pollster's model estimated Shumlin would beat Milne 51.1% to 37% with the probability that Shumlin would win the election at 95%.

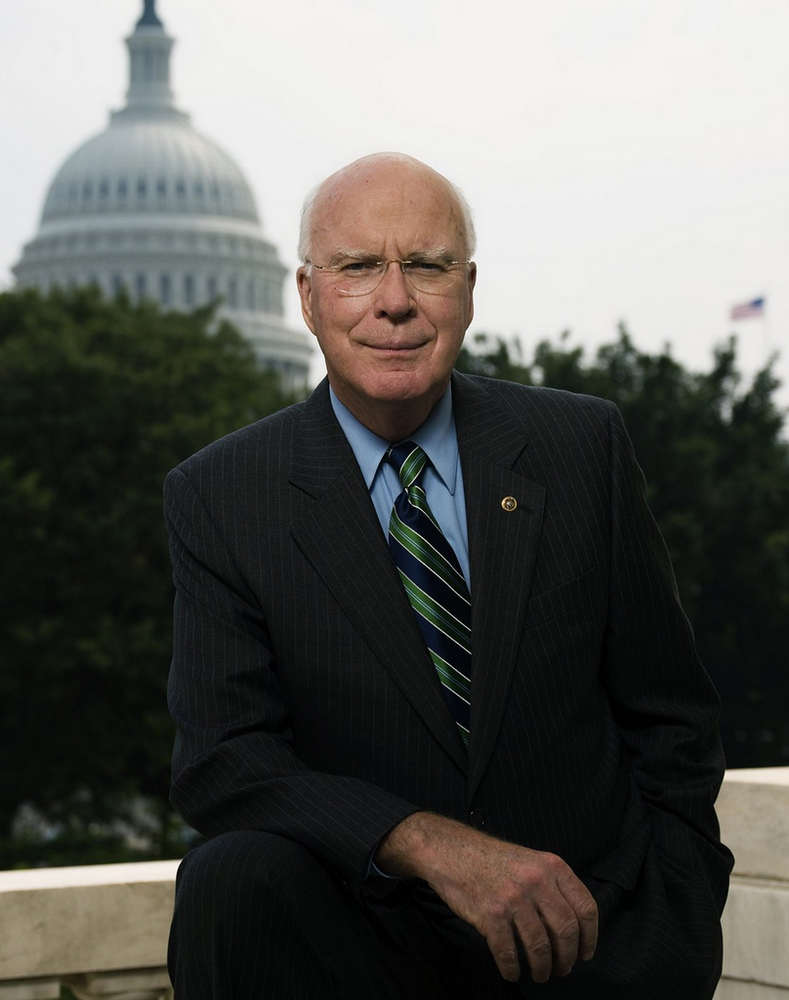
Democratic U.S. Senator Patrick Leahy, whose support Shumlin touted

Analyzing the results, The Burlington Free Press pointed to Shumlin's relatively soft numbers in opinion polls – he was in the mid-40s in the last four polls of the race – as evidence that voters were dissatisfied with the progress the state had made in instituting single-payer health care, with rising property taxes, and with the unsuccessful roll-out of Vermont Health Connect, the state's federal health care exchange. Shumlin's internal polls showed a close race and he touted an endorsement from U.S. senator Patrick Leahy to try to put him over 50%. By comparison, Milne lagged in fundraising and spending, with $100,000 available compared to Shumlin's $1.1 million, which meant that he could not afford to pay for polling. Opinions varied about the effect Libertarian nominee Dan Feliciano's candidacy had on the result. Former governor Douglas suggested that Feliciano split the anti-Shumlin vote. The Burlington Free Press speculated that Feliciano drew voters dissatisfied with Shumlin but who would have voted for Milne if they had realized that he had a chance to prevail. Feliciano stated that he was "not a spoiler" but drew voters who could not bring themselves to vote for the Republican candidate. A Feliciano campaign consultant felt, based on polling, that her candidate's stance against Shumlin's healthcare policy garnered votes. Milne, who did no polling, began criticizing Shumlin's healthcare policy later in the campaign than Feliciano. Republicans wondered whether they should have done more to push Feliciano out, whether Milne should have run more strongly against single-payer, whether 2012 nominee and former state auditor Randy Brock should have run again, and whether the state party should have been less focused on state legislative races.

Analysis by political experts pointed to the record-low voter turnout–around 43.6%–and that 39,000 more people voted for Democratic congressman Peter Welch than voted for Shumlin as a sign of dissatisfaction with Shumlin. University of Vermont political science professor Garrison Nelson said that "the people who showed up are the angry ones" and that, unlike Shumlin, "Welch demonstrated an appeal far beyond just the Democratic base."

In a news conference on November 12, Shumlin stated that the result was "humbling" and said that he would "listen, learn, reflect [and] be more inclusive." He also pledged to move ahead with single-payer health care and to address school spending, property taxes and the $100-million budget gap. On June 8, 2015, Shumlin announced that he would not run for a fourth term in 2016. He said that he had "never seen politics as a lifelong career" and "decided to make this decision now because I want these next 18 months to be about the work that we still have to do." He said that his decision was "not driven by poll numbers; [nor] driven by politics" and that after leaving office in January 2017, he would return to his family business in Putney.

Several candidates announced their intention to run: for the Democrats, former state senator and 2010 gubernatorial candidate Matt Dunne, former secretary of the Vermont Agency of Transportation and former state representative Sue Minter and Speaker of the Vermont House of Representatives Shap Smith; for the Republicans, retired banker Bruce Lisman and Lieutenant Governor Phil Scott. Milne did not run again. After saying that he was "unlikely" to run when Scott entered the race, it was later reported that he "would only get in the governor's race if Scott was to falter." Milne later clarified that he expected Scott to win the nomination and, in September 2015, officially endorsed him. Libertarian nominee Dan Feliciano, who joined the Republican Party in mid-January 2015, considered running for the Republican nomination.
