= 2012 Vermont gubernatorial election =

- November 6, 2012
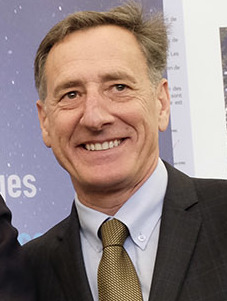

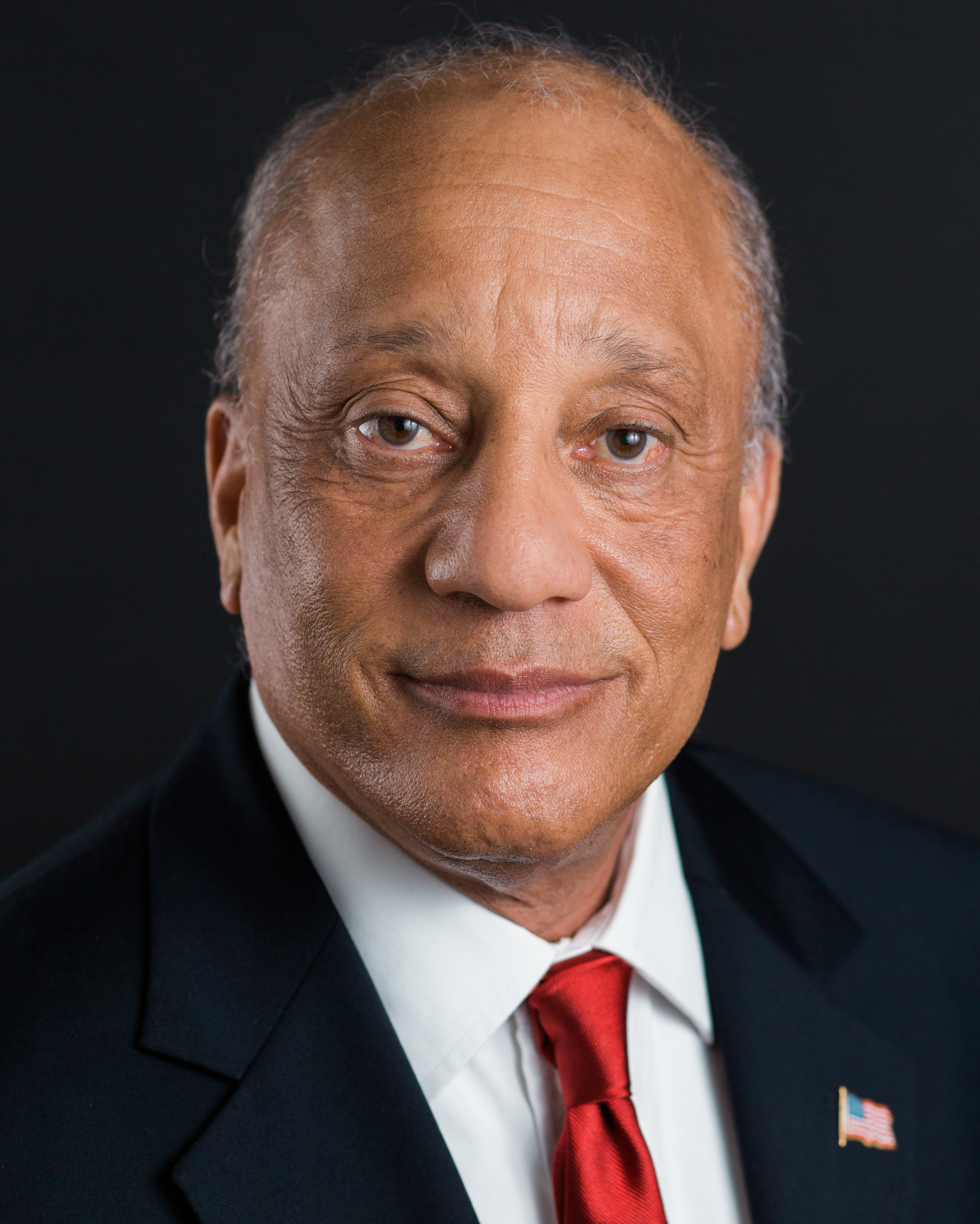
Nominee	Peter Shumlin	Randy Brock
Party	Democratic	Republican
Popular vote	170,749	110,940
Percentage	57.80%	37.55%
- Shumlin: 40–50% 50–60% 60–70% 70–80% 80–90% Brock: 40–50% 50–60% 60–70% Tie: 40–50% No votes
Governor before election
Peter Shumlin
Democratic
Elected Governor
Peter Shumlin
Democratic

The 2012 Vermont gubernatorial election took place on November 6, 2012, to elect the Governor of Vermont. Incumbent Democratic Governor Peter Shumlin won re-election to a second term, making this the only one of his gubernatorial elections in which he won a majority of the vote. In his 2010 and 2014 races, the Vermont General Assembly was required to choose a winner in accordance with the state constitution, because no candidate won a majority. This is the last time that Democrats carried Grand Isle, Lamoille, and Rutland counties in a gubernatorial election.

== Democratic nomination ==
=== Candidates ===
- Peter Shumlin, incumbent

== Republican nomination ==
=== Candidates ===
- Randy Brock, state senator and former state auditor

==== Declined ====
- Brian Dubie, former lieutenant governor and 2010 gubernatorial nominee
- Thom Lauzon, mayor of Barre
- Patricia McDonald, Vermont Republican Party Chairwoman and former state representative
- Roy Newton, newspaper publisher (did not file)
- Tom Salmon, state auditor
- Phil Scott, lieutenant governor
- Mark Snelling, 2010 candidate for lieutenant governor and son of former governor Richard Snelling

== Progressive nomination ==
=== Candidates ===
- Martha Abbott, chairwoman of the Vermont Progressive Party (resigned nomination in order to aid Shumlin by avoiding split in progressive/liberal votes)

== General election ==
=== Candidates ===
- Randy Brock (R), state senator and former state auditor
- Dave Eagle (Liberty Union)
- Cris Ericson (U.S. Marijuana), perennial candidate who also ran for the U.S. Senate
- Emily Peyton (Independent)
- Peter Shumlin (D), incumbent

=== Debates ===
- Complete video of debate, October 13, 2012 - C-SPAN

=== Predictions ===
Source	Ranking	As of
The Cook Political Report	Solid D	November 1, 2012
Sabato's Crystal Ball	Safe D	November 5, 2012
Rothenberg Political Report	Safe D	November 2, 2012
Real Clear Politics	Safe D	November 5, 2012

=== Polling ===
Poll source	Date(s) administered	Sample size	Margin of error	Peter Shumlin (D)	Randy Brock (R)	Undecided
Castleton Polling	August 11–21, 2012	477	± 4.5%	60%	26%	13%
Vermont Business Magazine	May 7–16, 2012	607	± 4.0%	60%	27%	11%
Public Policy Polling	July 28–31, 2011	1,233	± 2.8%	51%	29%	20%

Hypothetical polling

Poll source	Date(s) administered	Sample size	Margin of error	Peter Shumlin (D)	Brian Dubie (R)	Undecided
Public Policy Polling	July 28–31, 2011	1,233	± 2.8%	48%	40%	12%

Poll source	Date(s) administered	Sample size	Margin of error	Peter Shumlin (D)	Thom Lauzon (R)	Undecided
Public Policy Polling	July 28–31, 2011	1,233	± 2.8%	52%	25%	23%

Poll source	Date(s) administered	Sample size	Margin of error	Peter Shumlin (D)	Tom Salmon (R)	Undecided
Public Policy Polling	July 28–31, 2011	1,233	± 2.8%	50%	31%	18%

Poll source	Date(s) administered	Sample size	Margin of error	Peter Shumlin (D)	Phil Scott (R)	Undecided
Public Policy Polling	July 28–31, 2011	1,233	± 2.8%	50%	33%	17%

Poll source	Date(s) administered	Sample size	Margin of error	Peter Shumlin (D)	Mark Snelling (R)	Undecided
Public Policy Polling	July 28–31, 2011	1,233	± 2.8%	50%	29%	21%

=== Results ===

2012 Vermont gubernatorial election
Party	Candidate	Votes	%	±%
Democratic	Peter Shumlin (incumbent)	170,749	57.80%	+8.36%
Republican	Randy Brock	110,940	37.55%	−10.14%
Independent	Emily Peyton	5,868	1.99%	+1.71%
Marijuana	Cris Ericson	5,583	1.89%	+1.14%
Liberty Union	Dave Eagle	1,303	0.44%	+0.26%
Write-in		969	0.33%	+0.06%
Total votes		295,412	100.00%	N/A
Democratic hold				

==== By county ====
County	Peter Shumlin Democratic		Randy Brock Republican		Various candidates Other parties	
County	#	%	#	%	#	%
Addison	10,442	58.9%	6,664	37.6%	624	3.5%
Bennington	10,855	63.1%	5,109	29.7%	1,228	7.1%
Caledonia	6,373	47.1%	6,479	47.9%	679	5.1%
Chittenden	47,115	62.2%	25,609	33.8%	3,028	4.0%
Essex	1,207	43.8%	1,377	50.0%	171	6.3%
Franklin	8,937	45.1%	10,265	51.8%	606	3.1%
Grand Isle	2,089	51.7%	1,811	44.8%	143	3.5%
Lamoille	6,539	55.3%	4,686	39.6%	610	5.1%
Orange	7,918	57.0%	5,387	38.8%	576	4.2%
Orleans	5,186	44.8%	5,737	49.5%	660	5.7%
Rutland	13,954	49.3%	13,005	45.9%	1,355	4.8%
Washington	17,216	59.4%	10,540	36.3%	1,240	4.3%
Windham	14,747	68.4%	5,364	24.9%	1,456	6.7%
Windsor	18,020	63.7%	8,907	31.5%	1,347	4.8%
Totals	170,598	57.8%	110,940	37.6%	13,723	4.6%

Counties that flipped from Republican to Democratic

- Grand Isle (largest municipality: Alburgh)
- Lamoille (largest municipality: Morristown)
- Rutland (largest municipality: Rutland)

== See also ==
- 2012 United States presidential election in Vermont
