= Scott Milne =

American businessman and political candidate

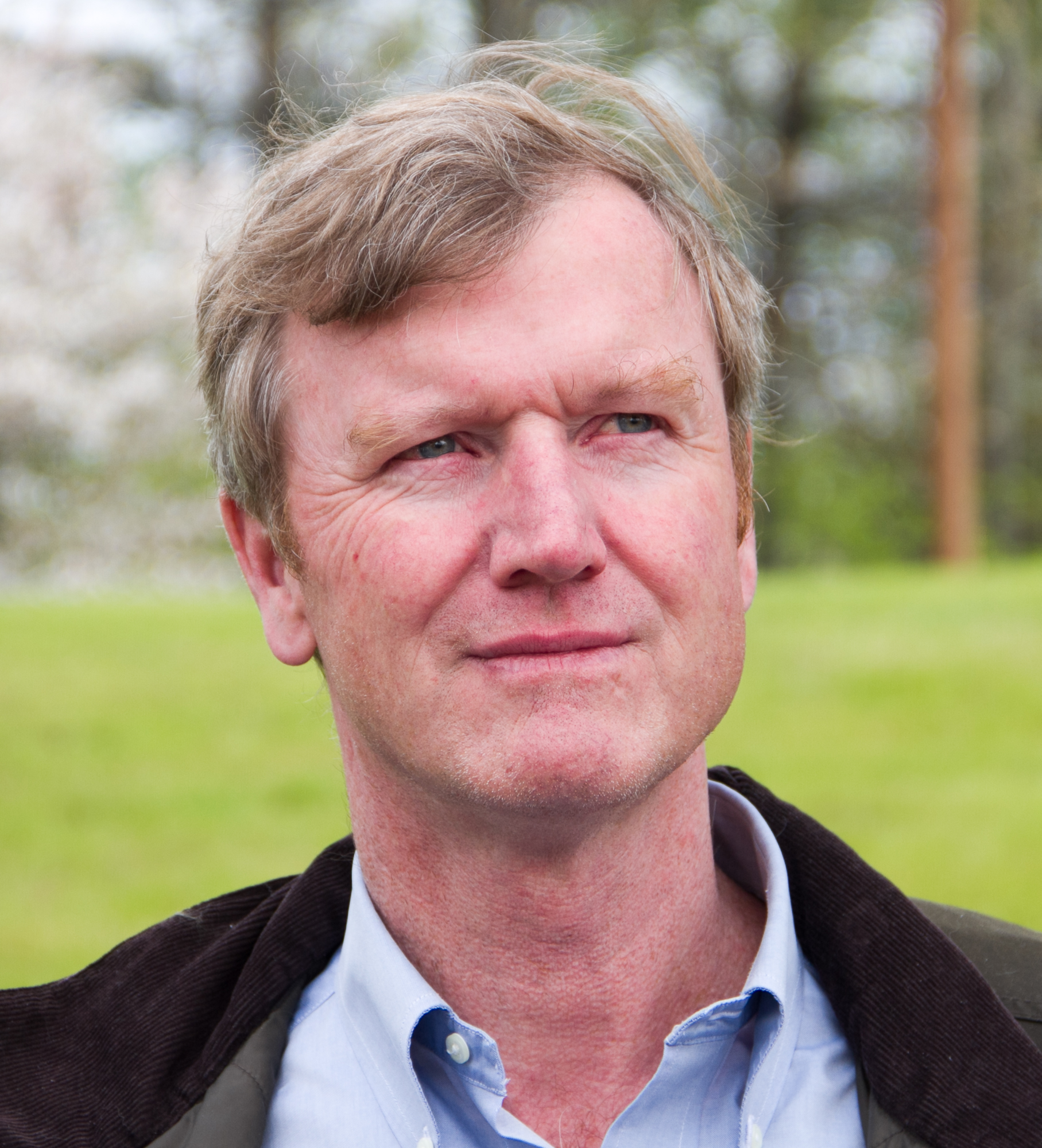

Personal details
- Born: Scott Edward Milne; March 10, 1959 (age 66); Brooklyn, New York, U.S.
- Political party: Republican
- Relatives: Donald Milne (father); Marion Milne (mother)
- Education: University of Redlands (BA)

Scott Edward Milne (born March 10, 1959) is an American businessman and political candidate from North Pomfret, Vermont. A Republican, Milne was the party's nominee for Lieutenant Governor of Vermont in 2020, losing to Democrat Molly Gray; the nominee for United States Senate in 2016, losing to incumbent Democrat Patrick Leahy; and the nominee for Governor of Vermont in 2014, losing to two-term incumbent Peter Shumlin in the closest gubernatorial election in Vermont since 1962.

== Early life and education ==
Milne was the second of four children born to Donald and Marion Milne in the New York borough of Brooklyn. The family lived in the town of Barre, Vermont, until 1964 then moved to the Orange County town of Washington. Their new home, Twin Brook Farm, had been a working sheep farm for much of the 1800s.

His parents started Milne Travel American Express in 1975. Milne himself was entrepreneurial as a child, "from selling newspapers and rabbits as a kid, to painting houses, to promoting concerts...." Additionally he has worked as a farm laborer, construction worker, grocery store clerk, bartender and waiter, political campaign aide, and investigator for a public defender as an unpaid intern.

Milne graduated from Barre's Spaulding High School in 1977 and attended the University of Vermont for a year. He then transferred to the University of Redlands, where he graduated in 1981 with a Bachelor of Arts degree in political science.

In college, Milne was arrested and convicted three times: twice for driving under the influence of alcohol, and once for possession of marijuana and cocaine.

== Business and civic life ==
Milne has worked at Milne Travel since the mid-1980s. It was started by his parents in 1975, and Milne later took over operation of the company.

Milne serves as president of the Vermont Society of Travel Agents and as an advisory board member for the Australian company Travcorp. He was an advisory board member of American Express and Avis. He is involved with the Vermont Chamber of Commerce and was president of the Vermont Association of Private and Non-Profit Organizations.

Through Milne Travel, Milne supports more than one hundred civic and non-profit organizations.

In January 2024, Milne and fellow Vermont Republican Myers Mermel purchased the Radio Vermont group, including WDEV, WCVT and WLVB, from the estate of Ken Squier following Squier's death two months prior. The purchase ends 88 years of the Squier family ownership of WDEV.

== Political family ==
Milne's paternal grandfather, Henry Milne, served in Vermont's state House representing Barre. He also worked for U.S. Senator George Aiken and served as state employment commissioner. A Milne cousin, James F. Milne, served as Vermont's secretary of state from 1995 to 1999.

Milne's father Donald served one year in the Vermont House. He also worked as an assistant clerk in Vermont's House and Senate, and as House clerk after 1993. He also made unsuccessful bids for the Legislature and for state's attorney, and was a longtime selectman for the town of Washington.

Milne's mother Marion served three two-year terms in the state House. In 2000, she cast a vote in favor of civil unions, and her subsequent unpopularity among conservative Republicans led to her loss when she ran for re-nomination later that year. Running as an Independent in the general election, she fell short of retaining her seat.

== Political life ==
Milne worked on the 1980 U.S. Senate primary campaign of Stewart Ledbetter, who won the Republican nomination but was defeated in the general election by the incumbent Democrat, Patrick Leahy. In 2000, Milne campaigned door-to-door for his mother as she attempted to retain her legislative seat.

In 2006, Milne won the Republican nomination for a Windsor County seat in the Vermont House of Representatives, and lost to the Democratic nominee, Mark B. Mitchell.

In 2014, Milne was the Republican nominee for governor. He narrowly lost to the Democratic nominee, incumbent Peter Shumlin.

In 2016, Milne was the Republican nominee for U.S. Senator, and lost to incumbent Patrick Leahy.

Milne won the Republican nomination for lieutenant governor in 2020. He faced Democrat Molly Gray in the general election. Milne hired Republican political operative Jim Barnett for his campaign. In the general election held on November 3, Gray defeated Milne.

== Political positions ==
=== ProgressVT Plan ===
In September 2020, Milne released his ProgressVT plan, a ten-pillar approach containing proposed policy reforms he would work towards as lieutenant governor. These include protecting the economically disadvantaged, revitalizing rural Vermont, opening up the lieutenant governor's office, growing the workforce, reforming health care, expanding educational opportunities, streamlining state government, securing our environment, valuing entrepreneurs, and tackling affordability. These include repealing Vermont's tax on Social Security income, eliminating the state taxation of military retirement income, simplifying occupational licensing requirements, bolstering state ethics laws, adjusting child care ratio flexibility, expanding tax credits for entrepreneurs, creating a sales tax holiday for electric vehicles and energy efficient equipment, and streamlining permitting laws, among other reforms.

=== Legalization of Marijuana ===
Milne was opposed to the legalization of recreational marijuana. In September 2016, Milne stated that he was opposed to further decriminalization of drugs, and thought that Vermont should pass stricter drug laws.

=== Firearms ===
Milne is a proponent of expanding background checks for purchasing firearms, and supports banning certain types of firearm.

=== Abortion ===
Milne describes himself as "pro-life", but his campaign has stated that he maintains pro-choice positions while also opposing healthcare providers being forced to offer free birth control coverage.

== 2014 Vermont gubernatorial election ==
Milne was the Republican nominee for Governor of Vermont in 2014. He finished in second place in the popular vote with 87,075 votes (45.1 percent). Two-time incumbent Democratic governor, Peter Shumlin, came in first with 89,509 popular votes (46.4 percent). Libertarian candidate Dan Feliciano earned 8,428 (4.4 percent). Because no candidate received 50 percent of the popular vote, the decision was made in Shumlin's favor by the Vermont House of Representatives and Senate. Milne was slow to concede defeat, noting that 54 percent of Vermonters voted against the incumbent. He later declined a recount request, citing the expected cost to the state.

According to uncertified results, Milne came within 2,434 votes of beating the two-term incumbent Democratic governor. A challenger had not defeated an incumbent governor in Vermont since 1962 when Phil Hoff, riding the popular wave of President John F. Kennedy, became the first Democratic governor in the state since 1854.

Milne declined to call for a recount of the vote—a right he earned by state law by coming within 2%—saying: "It is extremely unlikely, almost unfathomable, that a recount would put either candidate above the 50 percent mark." With no candidate gaining 50% of the popular vote, the election was decided by the 180 members of the Vermont House and Senate in January 2015.

Vermont gubernatorial election, 2014
Party	Candidate	Votes	%
Democratic	Peter Shumlin	89,509	46.36%
Republican	Scott Milne	87,075	45.1%
Libertarian	Dan Feliciano	8,428	4.36%
Independent	Emily Peyton	3,157	1.64%
Liberty Union	Peter Diamondstone	1,673	0.87%
Independent	Bernard Peters	1,434	0.74%
Independent	Cris Ericson	1,089	0.56%
Independent	Write-ins	722	0.37%
Total votes		193,087	100.00%

While Shumlin had earned a greater share of the popular vote, Milne had won more districts.

=== Determining winner ===
With no candidate receiving a majority, as required by the Vermont Constitution, the Vermont General Assembly decided the election by secret ballot January 8, 2015. Milne had said that if Shumlin won a plurality, he would support him, expecting that Shumlin would do the same if the situation were reversed.

By tradition, the General Assembly almost always selects the candidate who won a plurality in the general election. The most recent selection of a candidate who had not won a plurality was in 1976, when Republican T. Garry Buckley defeated Democrat John Alden for lieutenant governor. In the 2015 vote, Shumlin defeated Milne 110 votes to 69.

2014 Gubernatorial Election Results, Legislative Joint Assembly
Party	Candidate	Votes	%	±%
Democratic	Peter Shumlin	110	61.5%	
Republican	Scott Milne	69	38.5%	
Total votes		179	100.00%	

== 2016 U.S. Senate election ==
Milne ran in the 2016 U.S. Senate election in Vermont. He was the only declared Republican candidate. Milne faced seven-term Democratic senator Patrick Leahy as well as three minor party candidates. He lost the election, receiving 32% of the vote.

United States Senate election in Vermont, 2016
Party	Candidate	Votes	%	±%
Democratic	Patrick Leahy (incumbent)	192,243	59.99%	−3.05%
Republican	Scott Milne	103,637	32.34%	+2.08%
Marijuana	Cris Ericson	9,156	2.86%	+1.76%
Independent	Jerry Trudell	5,223	1.63%	N/A
Liberty Union	Peter Diamondstone	3,241	1.01%	0.40%
Write-ins		309	0.10%	N/A
Spoiled votes		466	0.15%	N/A
Blank votes		6,192	1.93%	N/A
Majority		88,606	27.65%	
Total votes		320,467	100.00%	
Democratic hold		Swing		

== 2020 Vermont lieutenant governor election ==
In 2020, Milne defeated several minor candidates to win the Republican nomination for lieutenant governor. The Democratic nomination was won by Molly Gray. In the general election, Gray defeated Milne and Progressive nominee Cris Ericson.

=== Republican primary ===
Republican primary results
Party	Candidate	Votes	%
Republican	Scott Milne	26,817	51.5
Republican	Meg Hansen	16,875	32.4
Republican	Dwayne Tucker	3,066	5.9
Republican	Dana Colson	2,736	5.2
Republican	Jim Hogue	1,944	3.7
Write-in	Write-ins	680	1.3
Total votes		52,118	100.0

=== General election ===
2020 Vermont lieutenant gubernatorial election
Party	Candidate	Votes	%
Democratic	Molly Gray	182,820	51.3
Republican	Scott Milne	157,065	44.1
Progressive	Cris Ericson	7,862	2.2
Independent	Wayne Billado III	5,101	1.4
Stop the F35s	Ralph Corbo	2,289	0.6
Write-in	Write-ins	1,097	0.3
Total votes		356,234	100.0

== Personal life ==
Milne resides in the unincorporated community of North Pomfret, Vermont, located within the town of Pomfret, and is a divorced father of two grown children.

In 2006, Milne suffered an ischemic stroke, but reportedly recovered with "very little residual effect."

Party political offices
Preceded by Randy Brock	Republican nominee for Governor of Vermont; 2014	Succeeded by Phil Scott
Preceded by Len Britton	Republican nominee for U.S. Senator from Vermont (Class 3); 2016	Succeeded by Gerald Malloy
Preceded by Donald H. Turner	Republican nominee for Lieutenant Governor of Vermont; 2020	Succeeded by Joe Benning
