= Vermont health care reform =

2011 US state government law

In 2011, the Vermont state government enacted a law functionally establishing the first state-level single-payer health care system in the United States. Green Mountain Care, established by the passage of H.202, creates a system in the state where Vermonters receive universal health care coverage as well as technological improvements to the existing system.

On December 17, 2014, Governor Peter Shumlin announced that Vermont would abandon its plan for single-payer health care, citing "potential economic disruption."

== Planning ==
In 2010, the State Legislature passed S 88 (which included provisions from Act 128), which enabled the state of Vermont to establish a commission to study different forms of health care delivery in the state. Dr. William Hsiao, a Harvard University professor of economics who was an advisor during Taiwan's transition to single-payer health care, was enlisted to design three possible options to reform Vermont's health care. Hsaio, along with Steven Kappel and Jonathan Gruber, presented the proposal to the legislature of Vermont on June 21, 2010.

The three options were laid out as follows:

- Option 1: As laid out by the requirements of Act 128, the first option would create "a government-administered and publicly financed single-payer health benefit system decoupled from employment which prohibits insurance coverage for the health services provided by this system and allows for private insurance coverage only of supplemental health services." The proposal considered this option to be the easiest path to single-payer, but was critical of the "complex and inefficient process" of proof of residency needs.
- Option 2: As laid out by the requirements of S 88, the second option would create "a public health benefit option administered by state government, which allows individuals to choose between the public option and private insurance coverage and allows for fair and robust competition among public and private plans." The commission noted that this option did not provide universal coverage on its own or the enforcement mechanism in place for any possible mandates put in place to achieve more coverage.
- Option 3: Act 128 allowed the commission to design a system that met the various principles outlined in Section 2 of the Act. The commission's design ultimately sought out an "approach to Option 3... by combining three studies to ascertain what type of universal health insurance, what methods of financing, and what type of single payer system is most likely to be politically and practically viable for Vermont."

The commission's proposal ultimately considered the third option to be "the most politically and practically viable single payer system for Vermont," noting that Vermont, "a small state with communitarian values," with its existing network of non-profit hospitals and a medical community that had previously shown support for state intervention, would be "uniquely poised to pass universal health reform."

== Legislation ==
Following the proposal, Democratic state representative Mark Larson introduced H 202 on February 8, 2011, titled Single-Payer and Unified Health System. The bill passed the House on March 24, 2011, with 94 votes in favor and 49 against. The bill then passed the Senate on April 26, 2011, with 21 votes in favor and 9 against. The conference report legislation passed the Senate on May 3, 2011, with 21 votes in favor and 9 opposed, and the House on May 4, 2011, with 94 votes in favor and 49 against. Governor Peter Shumlin signed the bill on May 26, 2011.

=== Green Mountain Care ===
The signing of H. 202 led to the creation of Green Mountain Care, described by Kaiser Health News as "a state-funded-and-managed insurance pool that would provide near-universal coverage to residents with the expectation that it would reduce health care spending." Governor Shumlin, in a blog post at Huffington Post, described the plan as "a single payer system" that he believed "will control health care costs, not just by cutting fees to doctors and hospitals, but by fundamentally changing the state's health care system." As of January 2013, Vermont was still working out the role of Green Mountain Care and the responsibilities of the bill, as well as how to fund the program. Dr. Hsiao, for example, had proposed an 11% payroll tax on employers, and the administration was required under Act 48 to provide a financing system in 2013. The state also had to align Green Mountain Care with provisions in the Patient Protection and Affordable Care Act, passed by the United States federal government in 2010, which required the creation of a health care exchange in individual states. To launch fully, Green Mountain Care would have had to gain approval from the federal government to use federal health finances to fund the state program.

As of April 2014, Vermont had yet to craft a bill that would address the $2 billion in extra spending necessary to fund the single-payer system, and by the end of the year, Governor Shumlin announced the government would abandon its plan for single-payer Green Mountain Care, citing "potential economic disruption."

== Popular opinion and reactions ==
Dr. Hsiao, in his proposal, noted that "a two-thirds majority of Vermonters said that all Vermonters should be able to get the health care they need when they need it, regardless of their ability to pay even if this means that they would have to pay higher taxes and higher insurance premiums themselves." The bill was passed in the Vermont legislature on party line votes, with Democrats and Progressives in favor and Republicans against. The bill is considered the first single-payer bill to be passed on the state level, but private insurers can continue to operate in the state. Representative Larson has described Green Mountain Care's provisions as "as close as we can get [to single-payer] at the state level."

According to Leigh Tofferi, the director of government, public and community relations for Blue Cross Blue Shield of Vermont, the lack of initial specifics was causing "anxiety" to many providers. The Vermont Medical Society had no position on the bill or on single-payer in general. David Himmelstein, the founder of Physicians for a National Health Program, a single-payer advocacy group, was critical of the plan due to the ability of private insurers to operate in the state, arguing that the plan "give[s] up a significant part of the administrative savings by doing that," but agreeing that Green Mountain Care "lays the foundation" for single-payer.

In the 2014 gubernatorial election, Governor Shumlin was heavily favored for re-election but only received a plurality of the vote, 46.4%, to Republican Scott Milne's 45.1%. The election was decided by the Vermont General Assembly on January 8, 2015; Shumlin defeated Milne by a vote of 110 to 69. The Burlington Free Press ascribed the result, in part, to voters' dissatisfaction with the progress the state had made in instituting single-payer health care.

== Aftermath ==
One of the problems found since the abandonment of the Vermont Health Care initiatives is questionable billing from Jonathan Gruber, who according to CNBC, has come under more scrutiny because of the contract. According to a Vermont State report filed by Doug Hoffer, an invoice sent by Gruber to Vermont on December 30, 2014, for $40,000 increased the amount of scrutiny on the billing.
