= Peter Shumlin =

American politician (born 1956)

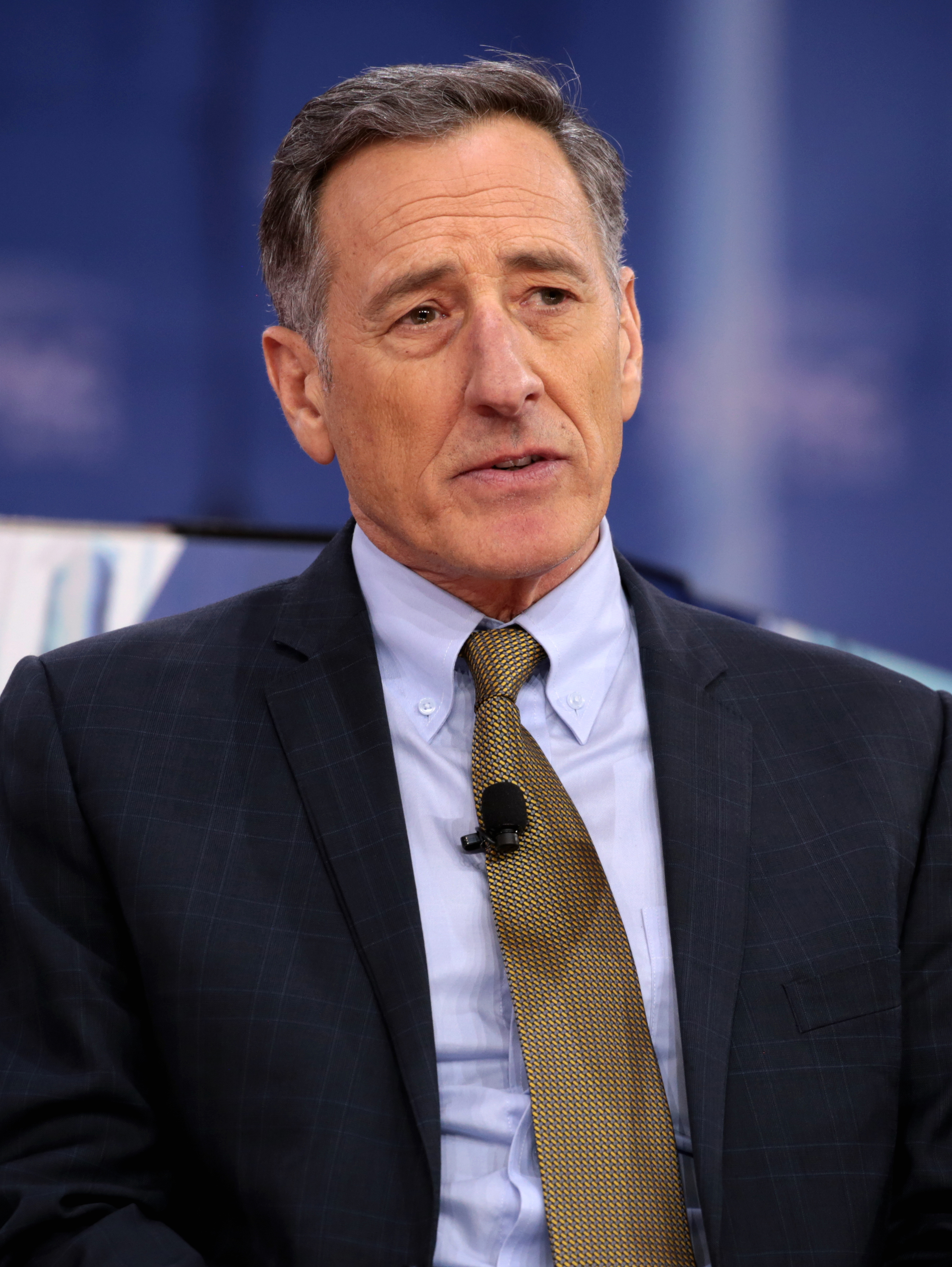
- Shumlin in 2018

81st Governor of Vermont
- In office January 6, 2011 – January 5, 2017
- Lieutenant: Phil Scott
- Preceded by: Jim Douglas
- Succeeded by: Phil Scott

77th and 79th President pro tempore of the Vermont Senate
- In office January 3, 2007 – January 5, 2011
- Preceded by: Peter Welch
- Succeeded by: John Campbell
- In office January 8, 1997 – January 8, 2003
- Preceded by: Stephen Webster
- Succeeded by: Peter Welch

Member of the Vermont Senate from the Windham County district
- In office January 3, 2007 – January 5, 2011 Serving with Jeanette White
- Preceded by: Rod Gander
- Succeeded by: Peter Galbraith
- In office January 6, 1993 – January 8, 2003 Serving with Jan Backus; Nancy Chard
- Preceded by: Robert T. Gannett
- Succeeded by: Rod Gander; Jeanette White

Personal details
- Born: Peter Elliott Shumlin; March 24, 1956 (age 70) Brattleboro, Vermont, U.S.
- Party: Democratic
- Spouses: Elizabeth Preston Parsons (m. 1981, divorced); Deborah Holway (m. 1989; div. 2013); Katie Hunt (m. 2015)
- Children: 2
- Education: Wesleyan University (BA)

Peter Elliott Shumlin (born March 24, 1956) is an American politician from Vermont. A member of the Democratic Party, he served as the 81st governor of Vermont from 2011 to 2017.

He was first elected to the office in 2010, and was reelected to a second term in 2012. In 2014 he received a narrow plurality in his race for reelection, but did not attain the 50% threshold mandated by the Constitution of Vermont. In such cases the Vermont General Assembly elects the winner. The legislature almost always selects the candidate who received a plurality; this held true, and the General Assembly re-elected Shumlin to a third term by a vote of 110–69 in January 2015. In June 2015, Shumlin announced that he would not seek re-election in 2016.

He signed laws on physician-assisted suicide as well as the United States' first genetically modified food labeling requirement during his tenure as governor. He was chair of the Democratic Governors Association during his first two terms.

He was a member of the Vermont House of Representatives from 1991 to 1993, and represented the Windham District in the Vermont Senate from 1993 to 2003 and again from 2007 to 2011. He was the unsuccessful Democratic nominee for Lieutenant Governor of Vermont in 2002.

== Early life, education and private career ==
Born in Brattleboro, Vermont, Shumlin went to high school at Buxton School in Williamstown, Massachusetts, and graduated from Wesleyan University in 1979. Shumlin served on Selectboard for the town of Putney in the 1980s and helped found Landmark College, which was created to help people with learning disabilities gain a college education. Shumlin's father, George J. Shumlin, a third-generation American, was descended from Ashkenazi Jewish immigrants from Russia; his mother, Kitty A. (Prins) Shumlin, was from The Hague in the Netherlands, and was Protestant.

== Early political career ==
=== Vermont Legislature ===
Shumlin was appointed by Governor Madeleine M. Kunin to fill a vacancy in the Vermont House of Representatives. He served part of one term plus one full term, and represented Putney from 1990 through 1993. In 1992, he was elected to the Vermont Senate, and he soon became Minority Leader. In the 1996 elections, Shumlin led his Senate Democrats to win back control of the chamber after four years in the minority, and in 1997 he became Senate President Pro Tempore.

=== Campaign for lieutenant governor ===
In 2002, Shumlin won the Democratic nomination for lieutenant governor, and lost the general election to Republican Brian Dubie of Essex in a three-way race that included Progressive Anthony Pollina of Middlesex.

=== Political hiatus ===
From 2003 to 2006, Shumlin returned to the Shumlin family business, Putney Student Travel, an educational firm that allows students in middle and high school to travel to foreign countries, learn about different cultures, and prepare for college.

=== Return to the Vermont Senate ===
In 2006, Shumlin ran successfully for his old seat in the State Senate upon the retirement of Rod Gander, who served from 2003 to 2007. Upon his return, Shumlin was once again elected President Pro Tempore.

== Governor of Vermont ==
=== Elections ===
==== 2010 ====
Shumlin in 2010

On November 16, 2009, Shumlin announced his candidacy for the Democratic nomination for Governor of Vermont. Shumlin placed first in the five-way August 24, 2010 Democratic primary with 18,276 votes (24.48%). The close election saw three other candidates come within 3,000 votes of Shumlin. Former Lieutenant Governor Doug Racine came in second with 18,079 votes (24.22%), Secretary of State of Vermont Deborah Markowitz came in third with 17,579 votes (23.9%) and former State Senator Matt Dunne was fourth with 15,323 votes (20.8%). State Senator Susan Bartlett came in a distant fifth with 3,759 votes (5.1%). Racine requested a recount, which confirmed Shumlin as the winner.

Shumlin was not opposed by a Progressive candidate for governor. The Party had promised not to play a "spoiler" role in the election if he supported single-payer health care, which he did. Vermont Progressive Party Chair Martha Abbott won the primary election, then withdrew from the race, so the party did not have a candidate on the ballot.

In the general election on November 2, 2010, Shumlin received the most votes, 119,543 (49.44%) to Republican Brian Dubie's 115,212 (47.69%). Vermont requires candidates for Governor and some other statewide offices to obtain a majority of popular votes, otherwise the winner is chosen by the Vermont General Assembly. Dubie did not contest the vote in the General Assembly, which almost always chooses the candidate who obtained a plurality in the general election, and on January 6, 2011, the General Assembly elected Shumlin by 145 votes (80.6%) to 28 (15.6%).

Vermont and New Hampshire are the only U.S. states whose governors do not serve four-year terms; rather, their governors are elected every two years, always in even-numbered years.

==== 2012 ====
The 2012 election took place on November 6, 2012. Shumlin, who again was endorsed by organized labor and the major environmental organizations, was unopposed in the Democratic primary and easily won re-election, defeating Republican Randy Brock by 170,749 votes (57.8%) to 110,940 votes (37.6%).

==== 2014 ====
Shumlin was the Democratic nominee for a third term. Republicans nominated businessman Scott Milne, whose mother Marion Carson Milne served in the Vermont House of Representatives, and father Donald was the longtime Assistant Clerk and Clerk of the Vermont House.

A major campaign promise of Shumlin was to establish a single-payer healthcare system for Vermont.

In the November 4 election, Shumlin took 46.4% to Milne's 45.1%, with Libertarian nominee Dan Feliciano taking 4.36%. The rest of the votes were scattered among other minor candidates. The Constitution of Vermont requires that the 180-member Vermont General Assembly choose the winner when no candidate receives over 50% of the popular vote. On January 8, 2015, the Assembly chose Shumlin over Milne by 110 votes to 69.

=== First term ===
==== Tenure ====
After Shumlin's election in 2010, all of his primary opponents except Dunne subsequently joined his administration. Racine became Secretary of Human Services, Markowitz became Secretary of the Agency of Natural Resources and Bartlett became Shumlin's Special Assistant, with responsibility for oversight of education and other policy initiatives.

The defining event of Shumlin's first term was Tropical Storm Irene, which caused almost every river and stream in the state to flood, resulting in at least three deaths and one missing. The storm decimated multiple sections of U.S. Route 4 between Rutland and Quechee, making east/west travel through the southern part of state nearly impossible. Several towns were completely isolated from travel in and out for two weeks. Statewide, the cost of repairs for road and bridge damage alone was estimated to exceed $700 million. This required a substantial re-assessment of Vermont's budget.

==== 2011 events ====
- April 26: Shumlin appeared on The Rachel Maddow Show via telephone where he discussed health care reform in his state, his belief in health care for all and that "health care is a right, not a privilege".
- May 26: Shumlin signed a bill to establish a state health care exchange under the Affordable Care Act and to develop future universal insurance coverage for all residents, making Vermont the first state to initiate a plan for single-payer health care.
- August 17: Shumlin became the first sitting governor in the United States to preside over a same-sex wedding ceremony.
- August 27: Shumlin declared a state of emergency, in preparation for the arrival of Tropical Storm Irene. In a joint statement, Vermont electric utilities announced that they planned to have extra staff on hand. The National Weather Service had forecast between 2–7 inches (51–178 mm) of rain in the state, with the risk of flooding near streams and rivers and an anticipated sustained wind speeds of 30–45 miles per hour (48–72 km/h) and gusts of up to 45–65 miles per hour (72–105 km/h), with expected significant tree damage and damage to power lines.

==== 2012 events ====
- January 5: In his State of the State Address, Shumlin touted Vermont's policies to promote job growth, claiming a 62% increase over the previous year to bring the state's unemployment rate down to 5.3% from a recession peak of 7.3%—both cited as low numbers in his speech.
- April 11: Shumlin was almost mauled by bears when he attempted to chase them away from raiding bird feeders on his property. Shumlin joked that Vermont "almost lost the governor," and added that he was within "three feet of getting 'arrrh.'"
- May 16: Shumlin signed a bill banning hydraulic fracturing ("fracking"), the breaking of underground rock formations by using pressurized chemical-laced fluid in order to access natural gas deposits. The bill made Vermont the first state to pass such a ban, and was signed in front of group of high school students who pushed for it.
- December 4: Shumlin was unanimously elected to serve as the chair of the Democratic Governors Association for the year, 2013.

=== Second term ===
==== Summary of term ====
Shumlin has been an opponent of the Vermont Yankee Nuclear Power Plant. His administration advocated its closure. However, on January 19, 2012, Judge J. Garvan Murtha of United States District Court in Brattleboro ruled that the state of Vermont could not force Vermont Yankee to close down, as the legislation that attempted to do so was based on radiological safety arguments that are the exclusive concern of the NRC. The judge also held that the state cannot force the plant's owner, Entergy, to sell electricity from the reactor to in-state utilities at reduced rates as a condition of continued operation. However, on August 27, 2013, Entergy announced in a press release that it would close Vermont Yankee by the end of 2014.

Shumlin initially ran for Governor as an advocate of single-payer health care. In 2011, the Vermont Legislature created a single-payer plan, called Green Mountain Care, which caused Vermont to become the first state to explore this concept. While the bill also allows private insurers to operate in the state indefinitely In January 2014, Shumlin said he was fully committed to full implementation of single-payer health care, starting in 2017. In the interim, Vermont participated in the Affordable Care Act. As was the case with the federal health-exchange website, Vermont's website, VermontHealthConnect.gov, also experienced difficulties as the deadline for implementation approached in late 2013; it was the product of the same software vendor. In December 2014, Shumlin announced that he would abandon plans for single-payer health care in Vermont, citing "potential economic disruption".

In his January 2014 State of the State Address, Shumlin emphasized a single theme: the rise of opiate addiction in Vermont. He framed the challenge of opiate abuse as greater in scope than the recovery from Tropical Storm Irene. He offered a four-point plan to address opiate growth:

- Fund more treatment to shorten wait times for those willing to accept help.
- Allow drug offenders to quickly enter treatment programs when they are ready to change their behavior, bypassing the normal judicial process to allow rapid treatment.
- Tougher punishments for drug-runners and armed burglars.
- Crowdsourcing new ideas to prevent addiction.

Shumlin observed that, "It's when the blue lights are flashing and cold reality sets in that we have our best shot [at persuading opiate users to seek treatment]".

==== 2013 events ====
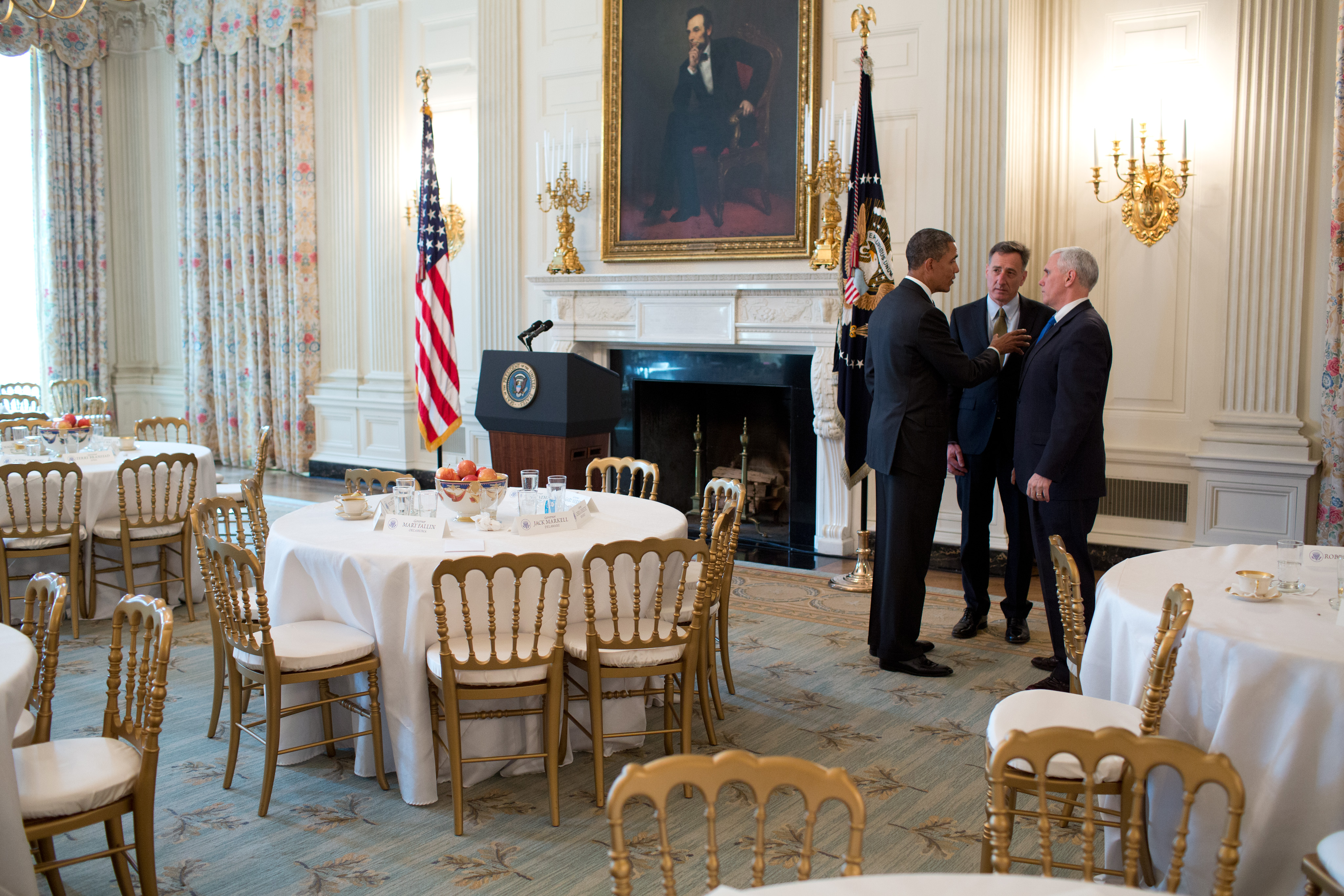
Shumlin meeting with Barack Obama and Mike Pence at the White House in 2013

- January 10: Shumlin gave a State of the State Address that emphasized improving education from kindergarten through college in Vermont in order to make the Vermont labor force more appealing to prospective employers.
- May 22: Shumlin signed a bill making physician assisted suicide legal throughout Vermont.
- June 6: Vermont became the 17th state to decriminalize cannabis. Shumlin signed a bill that made possession of less than an ounce of the drug punishable by a small fine rather than arrest and possible jail time.
- December 9: He was re-elected in December 2013 to be chair of the Democratic Governors Association for the year, 2014.

==== 2014 events ====
- January 8: Shumlin gave a State of the State Address with a single theme—the rising rate of opiate abuse in Vermont.
- January 15: A Shumlin administration official, Mark Larson, announced that the Vermont Health Connect website implementation of the federal Affordable Care Act was unavailable to small businesses enrollments, requiring direct enrollments with insurance companies until further notice.
- December 17: Shumlin announced that Vermont would abandon its plan for the single-payer Green Mountain Care health care reform, citing "potential economic disruption".

=== Third term ===
==== 2015 events ====
On June 8, 2015, Shumlin announced he would not seek a fourth term in 2016.

In contrast to other governors, who stated that they would attempt to turn away refugees fleeing the violence of the Syrian Civil War, Shumlin stated that Vermont would continue to welcome refugees. Shumlin said that the screening process weeded out people "who should not be accepted" and criticized governors who attempted to stop relocation, saying: "The governors who are taking those actions are stomping on the qualities that make America great, which is reaching out to folks when they're in trouble and offering them help, not hurting them."

==== 2016 events ====
In his final State of the State Address on January 7, 2016, Shumlin announced his support for the legalization of the consumption and sale of cannabis in the state of Vermont.

=== Pardons ===
During his term in office, Shumlin issued a total of 208 pardons, the most of any Vermont governor. Most of these were issued in January 2017, when Shumlin (in one of his final official acts as governor) granted a pardon to 192 people convicted of misdemeanor marijuana possession in Vermont. In the previous month, Shumlin had extended an offer for people with marijuana possession convictions to apply for a pardon, and about 450 had applied. The pardons were extended only "to people who had no violent criminal histories or felony convictions, and who had not been found guilty of driving under the influence or reckless driving."

== Political positions ==
Shumlin is adamantly pro-choice, and drew a contrast between himself and his 2010 Republican gubernatorial opponent Brian Dubie, who would not answer the question of whether or not he would cut funding for low-income abortions when pressed by Shumlin during the two candidates' televised debates. Shumlin held a pro-choice rally two days prior to the election, prompting his opponent to host a pro-jobs rally on the same day to draw a contrast between the two candidates' priorities.

In 2011, Shumlin expressed his support for "Team Kale" in its trademark dispute with fast food restaurant Chick-fil-A and said it sends the message "Don't mess with Vermont."

Shumlin supports same-sex marriage and presided over its legalization in the state of Vermont during his tenure as President Pro Tempore of the Vermont Senate.

On May 8, 2015, Shumlin signed a genetically modified food (GMO) labeling bill. The legislation would mean that some products that are sold within the state of Vermont must have labeling that says that the product "may be partially produced with genetic engineering."

== Personal life ==
=== Family ===
Shumlin was married to Deborah Holway from 1989 to 2013; they have two daughters together.

In September 2015, Shumlin announced his engagement to girlfriend Kate Hunt. They married in December 2015 in a ceremony at their East Montpelier home.

=== Real estate controversy ===
In May 2013, Shumlin was involved in a real estate transaction which generated controversy. A neighbor, who owned a house and land adjacent to Shumlin's East Montpelier home, owed back taxes and risked losing the property in a tax sale, and asked Shumlin to consider buying the property. Shumlin bought the property, had the assessed value reduced because the house was in disrepair, paid the back taxes, paid the neighbor's back child support, and allowed the neighbor to continue living in the house for several months. The neighbor then had second thoughts about the transaction. After some criticism in the press, Shumlin agreed to let the neighbor repurchase the property.

== Electoral history ==
Vermont House of Representatives Windham 1 District election, 1990
Party	Candidate	Votes	%
Democratic	Peter Shumlin	1,749	33.7
Democratic	David Deen	1,507	29.0
Republican	David Hannum, Jr.	655	12.6
Independent	Lettieri	582	11.2
Republican	Stephen Angers	559	10.8
Liberty Union	Nancy Egan Sternbach	133	2.6
Write-ins	Write-ins	5	0.1

Vermont State Senate Windham District election, 1992
Party	Candidate	Votes	%
Democratic	Peter Shumlin	10,784	31.5
Democratic	Jan Backus	9,023	26.3
Republican	Nathan Lynch	5,509	16.1
Independent	Michael Veitch	4,554	13.3
Independent	Arthur Lettieri	3,724	10.9
Liberty Union	Guido Condosta	357	1.0
Liberty Union	Terence Sellaro	315	0.9

Vermont State Senate Windham District election, 1994
Party	Candidate	Votes	%
Democratic	Peter Shumlin (incumbent)	7,469	29.6
Democratic	Nancy Chard	6,808	27.1
Republican	Anne Bernhardt	5,393	21.5
Republican	Art Lettieri	4,114	15.5
Independent	Doug Bruce	795	3.2
Liberty Union	Fred Herbert	308	1.2
Liberty Union	Ki Longfellow	198	0.8

Vermont State Senate Windham District election, 1996
Party	Candidate	Votes	%
Democratic/Republican	Nancy Chard (incumbent)	13,070	45.5
Democratic/Republican	Peter Shumlin (incumbent)	12,893	45.3
Liberty Union	Fred Herbert	1,344	4.7
Liberty Union	Ki Longfellow	989	3.4
Write-ins	Write-ins	150	0.5

Vermont State Senate Windham District election, 1998
Party	Candidate	Votes	%
Democratic	Nancy Chard (incumbent)	7,976	29.4
Democratic	Peter Shumlin (incumbent)	7,580	28.2
Republican	Michael Hebert	5,901	23.1
Republican	Clint Barnum	4,173	16.6
Liberty Union	Steven K-Brooks	567	2.1
Write-ins	Write-ins	34	0.1

Vermont State Senate Windham District election, 2000
Party	Candidate	Votes	%
Democratic	Peter Shumlin (incumbent)	9,827	27.0
Democratic	Nancy Chard (incumbent)	9,305	25.6
Republican	Michael Hebert	7,256	19.9
Republican	Sean McKeon	6,500	17.9
Progressive	Richard Davis	2,840	7.8
Liberty Union	Aaron Diamondstone	624	1.7
Write-ins	Write-ins	22	0.1

Vermont Lieutenant Governor election, 2002
Party	Candidate	Votes	%
Republican	Brian Dubie	94,044	41.2
Democratic	Peter Shumlin	73,501	32.2
Progressive	Anthony Pollina	56,564	24.8
Vermont Grassroots	Sally Ann Jones	4,310	1.9
Write-ins	Write-ins	116	0.1

Vermont State Senate Windham District election, 2006
Party	Candidate	Votes	%
Democratic	Peter Shumlin	12,516	46.1
Democratic	Jeanette White	11,406	42.0
Liberty Union	Aaron Diamondstone	1,562	5.8
Liberty Union	Benjamin Mitchell	1,505	5.5
Write-ins	Write-ins	166	0.6

Vermont State Senate Windham District election, 2008
Party	Candidate	Votes	%
Democratic	Peter Shumlin (incumbent)	14,866	47.8
Democratic	Jeanette White (incumbent)	13,531	43.5
Liberty Union	Aaron Diamondstone	2,464	7.9
Write-ins	Write-ins	219	0.7

Vermont Governor Democratic primary election, 2010
Party	Candidate	Votes	%
Democratic	Peter Shumlin	18,276	24.8
Democratic	Doug Racine	18,079	24.6
Democratic	Deb Markowitz	17,579	23.9
Democratic	Matt Dunne	15,323	20.8
Democratic	Susan Bartlett	3,759	5.1
Democratic	Write-ins	560	0.8

Vermont Governor election, 2010
Party	Candidate	Votes	%
Democratic	Peter Shumlin	119,543	49.5
Republican	Brian Dubie	115,212	47.7
Independent	Dennis Steele	1,917	0.8
U.S. Marijuana	Cris Ericson	1,819	0.8
Independent	Dan Feliciano	1,341	0.6
Independent	Em Peyton	684	0.3
Write-ins	Write-ins	527	0.2
Liberty Union	Ben Mitchell	429	0.2

Vermont Governor election, 2012
Party	Candidate	Votes	%
Democratic	Peter Shumlin (incumbent)	170,569	58.0
Republican	Randy Brock	110,824	37.7
Independent	Emily Peyton	5,862	2.0
U.S. Marijuana	Cris Ericson	5,580	1.9
Liberty Union	Dave Eagle	1,297	0.4
Write-ins	Write-ins	168	0.1

Vermont Governor Democratic primary election, 2014
Party	Candidate	Votes	%
Democratic	Peter Shumlin (incumbent)	15,260	77.0
Democratic	Brooke Paige	3,199	16.1
Democratic	Write-ins	1,369	6.9

Vermont Governor election, 2014
Party	Candidate	Votes	%
Democratic	Peter Shumlin (incumbent)	89,509	46.5
Republican	Scott Milne	87,075	45.2
Libertarian	Dan Feliciano	8,428	4.4
Independent	Emily Peyton	3,157	1.6
Liberty Union	Pete Diamondstone	1,673	0.9
Independent	Bernard Peters	1,434	0.7
Independent	Cris Ericson	1,089	0.6
Write-ins	Write-ins	241	0.1

Vermont Senate
Preceded by Stephen Webster	President pro tempore of the Vermont Senate; 1997–2003	Succeeded by Peter Welch
Preceded by Peter Welch	President pro tempore of the Vermont Senate; 2007–2011	Succeeded by John Campbell
Party political offices
Preceded by Doug Racine	Democratic nominee for Lieutenant Governor of Vermont; 2002	Succeeded by Cheryl Pratt Rivers
Preceded by Gaye Symington	Democratic nominee for Governor of Vermont; 2010, 2012, 2014	Succeeded by Sue Minter
Preceded by Martin O'Malley	Chair of the Democratic Governors Association; 2012–2014	Succeeded by Steve Bullock
Political offices
Preceded by Jim Douglas	Governor of Vermont; 2011–2017	Succeeded by Phil Scott
U.S. order of precedence (ceremonial)
Preceded by Jim Douglas as Former Governor	Order of precedence of the United States; Within Vermont	Succeeded by Jack Markell as Former Governor
Preceded by Jim Douglas as Former Governor	Order of precedence of the United States; Outside Vermont	Succeeded by Paul E. Patton as Former Governor
