= 2016 United States Senate election in Vermont =

- November 8, 2016
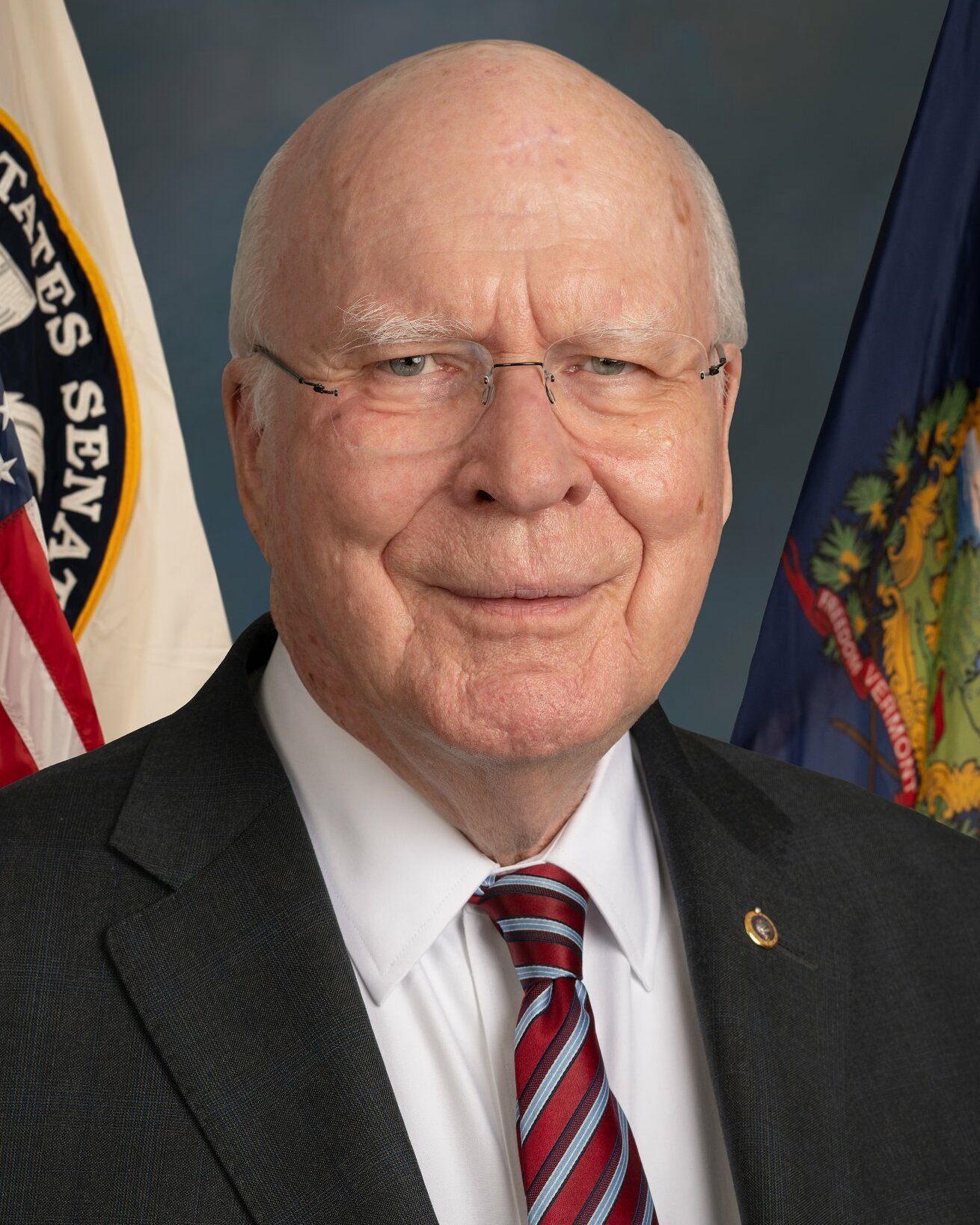

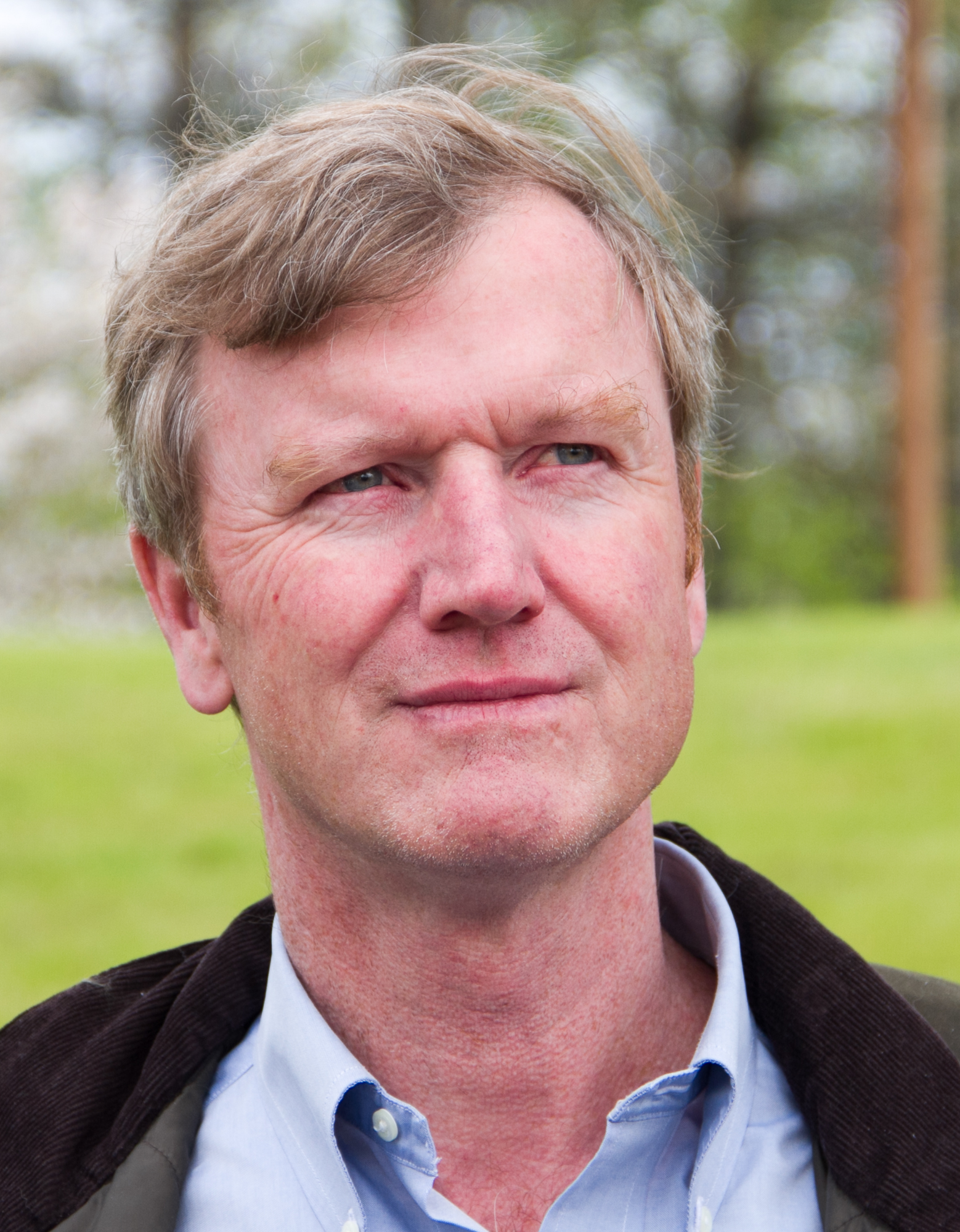
Nominee	Patrick Leahy	Scott Milne
Party	Democratic	Republican
Popular vote	192,243	103,637
Percentage	61.26%	33.03%
- Leahy: 40–50% 50–60% 60–70% 70–80% 80–90% Milne: 40–50% 50–60% 60–70%
U.S. senator before election
Patrick Leahy
Democratic
Elected U.S. Senator
Patrick Leahy
Democratic

The 2016 United States Senate election in Vermont was held November 8, 2016, to elect a member of the United States Senate to represent the state of Vermont, concurrently with the 2016 U.S. presidential election, as well as other elections to the United States Senate in other states and elections to the United States House of Representatives and various state and local elections. The primaries were held August 9.

Incumbent Democratic Senator Patrick Leahy, the most senior member in the Senate, the longest-serving U.S. Senator from Vermont, and the first Democrat to be elected to a Senate seat in Vermont, won re-election to a record eighth term in office, the final term he would serve.

== Democratic primary ==
=== Candidates ===
==== Declared ====
- Cris Ericson, perennial candidate, later ran as Marijuana Party nominee (also ran for governor)
- Patrick Leahy, incumbent U.S. Senator

=== Results ===
Democratic primary results
Party	Candidate	Votes	%
Democratic	Patrick Leahy (incumbent)	62,412	89.15%
Democratic	Cris Ericson	7,595	10.85%
Total votes		70,007	100.00%

== Republican primary ==
=== Candidates ===
==== Declared ====
- Scott Milne, businessman, candidate for the State House in 2006 and nominee for governor in 2014

== Liberty Union primary ==
This election was the last in which Diamondstone ran prior to his death in 2017. Diamondstone had run for Vermont statewide office in every biennial election since 1970.

=== Candidates ===
==== Declared ====
- Peter Diamondstone, LU party co-founder, lawyer, and perennial candidate

== Other candidacies ==
=== Declared ===
- Jerry Trudell, independent candidate, environmental activist, candidate for House of Representatives in 2014
- Cris Ericson, Marijuana Party perennial candidate, previously sought Democratic nomination

== General election ==
=== Candidates ===
- Patrick Leahy (D)
- Scott Milne (R)
- Jerry Trudell (I)
- Peter Diamondstone (LU)
- Cris Ericson (MJ)

=== Predictions ===
Source	Ranking	As of
The Cook Political Report	Safe D	November 2, 2016
Sabato's Crystal Ball	Safe D	November 7, 2016
Rothenberg Political Report	Safe D	November 3, 2016
Daily Kos	Safe D	November 8, 2016
Real Clear Politics	Safe D	November 7, 2016

=== Debates ===
Dates	Location	Leahy	Milne	Ericson	Trudell	Diamondstone	Link
October 18, 2016	Burlington, Vermont	Participant	Participant	Participant	Participant	Participant	

=== Polling ===
Poll source	Date(s) administered	Sample size	Margin of error	Patrick Leahy (D)	Scott Milne (R)	Other	Undecided
SurveyMonkey	November 1–7, 2016	454	± 4.6%	75%	24%	—	1%
SurveyMonkey	October 31 – November 6, 2016	447	± 4.6%	75%	24%	—	1%
SurveyMonkey	October 28 – November 3, 2016	449	± 4.6%	69%	28%	—	3%
SurveyMonkey	October 27 – November 2, 2016	424	± 4.6%	65%	32%	—	3%
SurveyMonkey	October 26 – November 1, 2016	428	± 4.6%	64%	34%	—	2%
SurveyMonkey	October 25–31, 2016	436	± 4.6%	64%	33%	—	3%
Braun Research/WCAX	October 19–22, 2016	603	± 4.0%	64%	29%	3%	5%
Castleton University	September 29 – October 14, 2016	579	± 3.9%	59%	22%	7%	10%
Emerson College	September 2–5, 2016	600	± 3.9%	57%	34%	4%	5%
Castleton University	July 11–23, 2016	637	± 3.9%	62%	23%	1%	11%

=== Results ===
United States Senate election in Vermont, 2016
Party	Candidate	Votes	%	±%
Democratic	Patrick Leahy (incumbent)	192,243	61.26%	−3.10%
Republican	Scott Milne	103,637	33.03%	+2.10%
Marijuana	Cris Ericson	9,156	2.92%	+1.76%
Independent	Jerry Trudell	5,223	1.66%	N/A
Liberty Union	Peter Diamondstone	3,241	1.03%	+0.42%
Write-in		309	0.10%	N/A
Total votes		313,809	100.00%	N/A
Democratic hold				

==== By county ====
By county

County	Patrick Leahy Democratic		Scott Milne Republican		Various candidates Other parties	
County	#	%	#	%	#	%
Addison	11,882	62.44%	6,294	33.08%	853	4.38%
Bennington	10,246	59.4%	5,527	32.04%	1,476	8.56%
Caledonia	7,348	52.21%	5,910	41.99%	816	5.8%
Chittenden	57,338	69.21%	21,654	26.14%	3,856	4.65%
Essex	1,324	45.8%	1,356	46.9%	211	7.29%
Franklin	11,948	55.63%	8,526	39.7%	1,004	4.67%
Grand Isle	2,363	57.49%	1,556	37.86%	191	4.65%
Lamoille	7,902	61.89%	4,163	32.61%	702	5.5%
Orange	8,073	55.11%	5,823	39.75%	754	5.14%
Orleans	6,033	50.39%	5,199	43.42%	741	6.19%
Rutland	15,404	52.29%	12,492	42.41%	1,562	5.3%
Washington	19,628	62.94%	9,914	31.79%	1,642	5.27%
Windham	14,720	66.01%	5,410	24.26%	2,171	9.73%
Windsor	18,034	60.52%	9,813	32.93%	1,950	6.55%
Totals	192,243	61.26%	103,637	33.03%	17,929	5.71%

Counties that flipped from Democratic to Republican

- Essex (largest town: Lunenburg)
