= Marion Milne =

American politician

Marion Carson Milne (January 2, 1935 – August 11, 2014) was an American businesswoman and politician.

Born in Brooklyn, New York City, Milne received her bachelor's degree from Goddard College in 1975. She owned Milne Travel, a travel agency, in Barre, Vermont. Milne served in the Vermont House of Representatives from 1995 to 2001 as a Republican. Milne died in Washington, Vermont. Her husband, Donald Milne, also served in the Vermont House.

Her son, Scott Milne, now runs Milne Travel and was the 2014 Republican gubernatorial candidate in Vermont.
