= Donald Milne =

American politician

Donald George Milne (July 16, 1934 – January 24, 2016) was an American lawyer and politician.

Born in Barre, Vermont, Milne graduated from Spaulding High School in 1952, Boston University (1957), and New York Law School (1959). He served on the Washington, Vermont selectboard and on the Washington school board. Milne also served in the Vermont House of Representatives in 1967. He then served as clerk of the Vermont House of Representatives from 1993 until his retirement in 2015. His wife, Marion Milne, also served in the Vermont House.

Milne died of cancer in Washington, Vermont.

His son, Scott Milne, now runs Milne Travel and was the unsuccessful 2014 Republican gubernatorial candidate in Vermont.

His cousin, James F. Milne, served as Secretary of State of Vermont from 1995 to 1999.
