= Randy Brock =

American politician (born 1943)

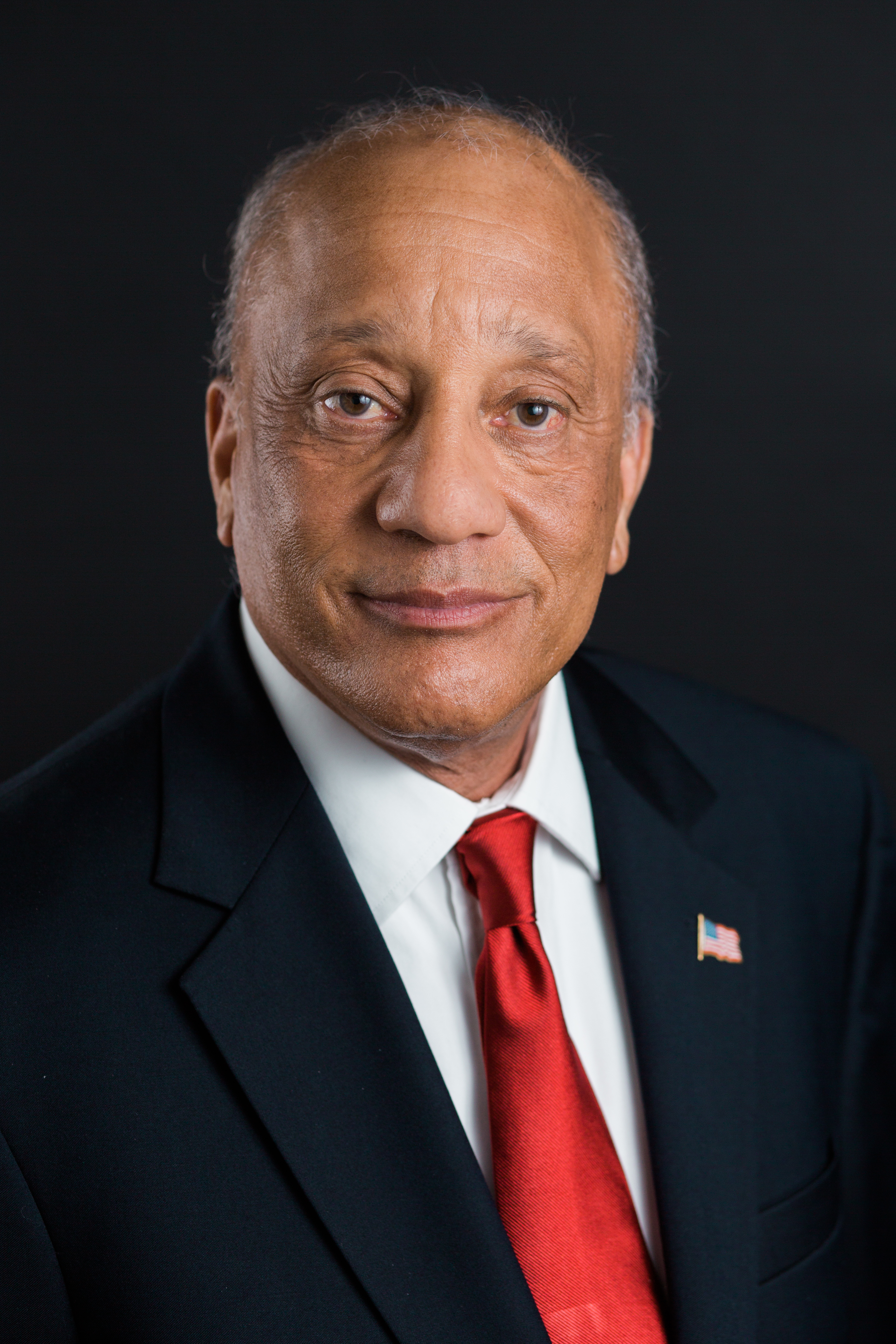
- Brock in 2015

Minority Leader of the Vermont Senate
- In office January 6, 2021 – January 8, 2025
- Preceded by: Joe Benning
- Succeeded by: Scott Beck

Member of the Vermont Senate from the Franklin district
- Incumbent
- Assumed office December 27, 2017 Serving with Robert Norris
- Preceded by: Dustin Allard Degree
- In office January 7, 2009 – January 9, 2013
- Preceded by: Donald Collins
- Succeeded by: Norm McAllister

28th Auditor of Vermont
- In office January 3, 2005 – January 4, 2007
- Governor: Jim Douglas
- Preceded by: Liz Ready
- Succeeded by: Thomas Salmon

Personal details
- Born: September 28, 1943 (age 82) Philadelphia, Pennsylvania, U.S.
- Party: Republican
- Spouse: Andrea Forrest
- Children: 2
- Education: Middlebury College (BA); Yale University (MA)

Military service
- Allegiance: United States
- Branch/service: United States Army
- Battles/wars: Vietnam War

Randolph D. "Randy" Brock III (born September 28, 1943) is an American politician from the state of Vermont and a member of the Republican Party. He currently serves in the Vermont Senate and is the first African American caucus leader in Vermont. He served as the Vermont Auditor of Accounts from 2005 to 2007 and as a member of the Vermont Senate from 2009 to 2013, and was the Republican nominee for Governor of Vermont in 2012, losing to Democratic incumbent Peter Shumlin. He ran unopposed for the 2016 Republican nomination for Lieutenant Governor of Vermont. In December 2017, Governor Phil Scott announced that he had appointed Brock to the Vermont Senate, filling the vacancy caused by the resignation of Dustin Allard Degree.

== Early and personal life ==
Brock was born in Philadelphia, Pennsylvania. He holds a B.A. from Middlebury College and an M.A. from Yale University.

Brock served in the United States Army, attaining the rank of captain. He saw action in the Vietnam War, earning a Bronze Star and an Army Commendation Medal.

He is a retired executive vice president for Fidelity Investments.

He is married to Andrea Forrest Brock, and the couple has two children.

== State Auditor ==
=== 2004 election ===
Brock was elected as Auditor in 2004, defeating Democratic incumbent Elizabeth M. Ready in her bid for re-re-election.

=== 2006 election and recount ===
In the November 7, 2006 election, Brock was challenged by Democratic candidate Thomas M. Salmon, the son of former Vermont Governor Thomas P. Salmon. The initial vote tally put Brock ahead by 137 votes. However, Salmon requested a recount, and on December 21, 2006, Salmon was declared the winner by a margin of 102 votes.

== State Senate ==
In 2008, Brock was elected to the Vermont State Senate. He was re-elected in 2010.

== 2012 gubernatorial election ==
On December 7, 2011, Brock announced his candidacy for Governor of Vermont in the 2012 gubernatorial election. He received the Republican nomination unopposed and ran against incumbent Democratic Governor Peter Shumlin. Brock, however, only received 37.7% of the vote; Shumlin was easily re-elected, with 170,598 votes to Brock's 110,940.

== 2016 Lieutenant Governor election ==
Brock ran unopposed for the 2016 Republican nomination for Lieutenant Governor of Vermont, and faced Senator David Zuckerman in the general election. He lost in the general election, receiving 139,344 votes to Zuckerman's 159,738.

== Return to State Senate ==
In November 2017, Republican Dustin Allard Degree resigned from the Vermont Senate to accept a position as special assistant to Governor Phil Scott. In December, Scott interviewed three candidates recommended by the Franklin County Republican Party. On December 27, Scott announced that he had selected Brock to fill the vacancy. In November 2020, Brock was elected minority leader in the state senate. He is the first African-American caucus leader in Vermont ever.

== Political positions ==
Brock is viewed as a moderate-leaning Republican, considering Vermont’s politically progressive reputation, but he takes more conservative positions on certain issues. He opposes same-sex marriage, voting against legislation to legalize it in Vermont in 2009; however, during his 2012 gubernatorial campaign, he supported the Vermont Supreme Court’s decision to allow civil unions between same-sex couples. He is against gun-control legislation, voting against 2018 legislation that was signed by fellow Republican Governor Phil Scott that expanded background checks for gun buyers to include private firearms sales, set limits on the size of magazines for handguns and long guns, raised the minimum age to purchase a firearm in Vermont to 21, and banned bump stocks. However, he is pro-choice, supported Roe v. Wade, and opposes the prohibition of public funds for organizations that perform abortions.

According to Vote Smart’s 2020 election analysis of his positions, Brock supported pro-choice legislation, opposes marijuana legalization, opposes tax increases, supported voter identification requirements and automatic voter registration, opposed capital punishment and other tough-on-crime policies, supported government regulations of greenhouse gas emissions, supported government funding for development of renewable energy, opposes gun-control legislation, supports Medicaid expansion, supports the inclusion of gender identity and sexual orientation in anti-discrimination laws, supported both government spending and lowering state income taxes as a means of promoting economic growth, opposes raising the minimum wage, and supports state funding for charter schools.

Party political offices
Preceded by Bruce Hyde	Republican nominee for Auditor of Vermont; 2004, 2006	Vacant Title next held by Thomas M. Salmon
Preceded by Brian Dubie	Republican nominee for Governor of Vermont; 2012	Succeeded by Scott Milne
Preceded by Phil Scott	Republican nominee for Lieutenant Governor of Vermont; 2016	Succeeded by Donald H. Turner
Political offices
Preceded by Liz Ready	Auditor of Vermont; 2005–2007	Succeeded by Tom Salmon
Vermont Senate
Preceded by Joe Benning	Minority Leader of the Vermont Senate; 2021–2025	Succeeded by Scott Beck
