= 2010 Vermont gubernatorial election =

- November 2, 2010
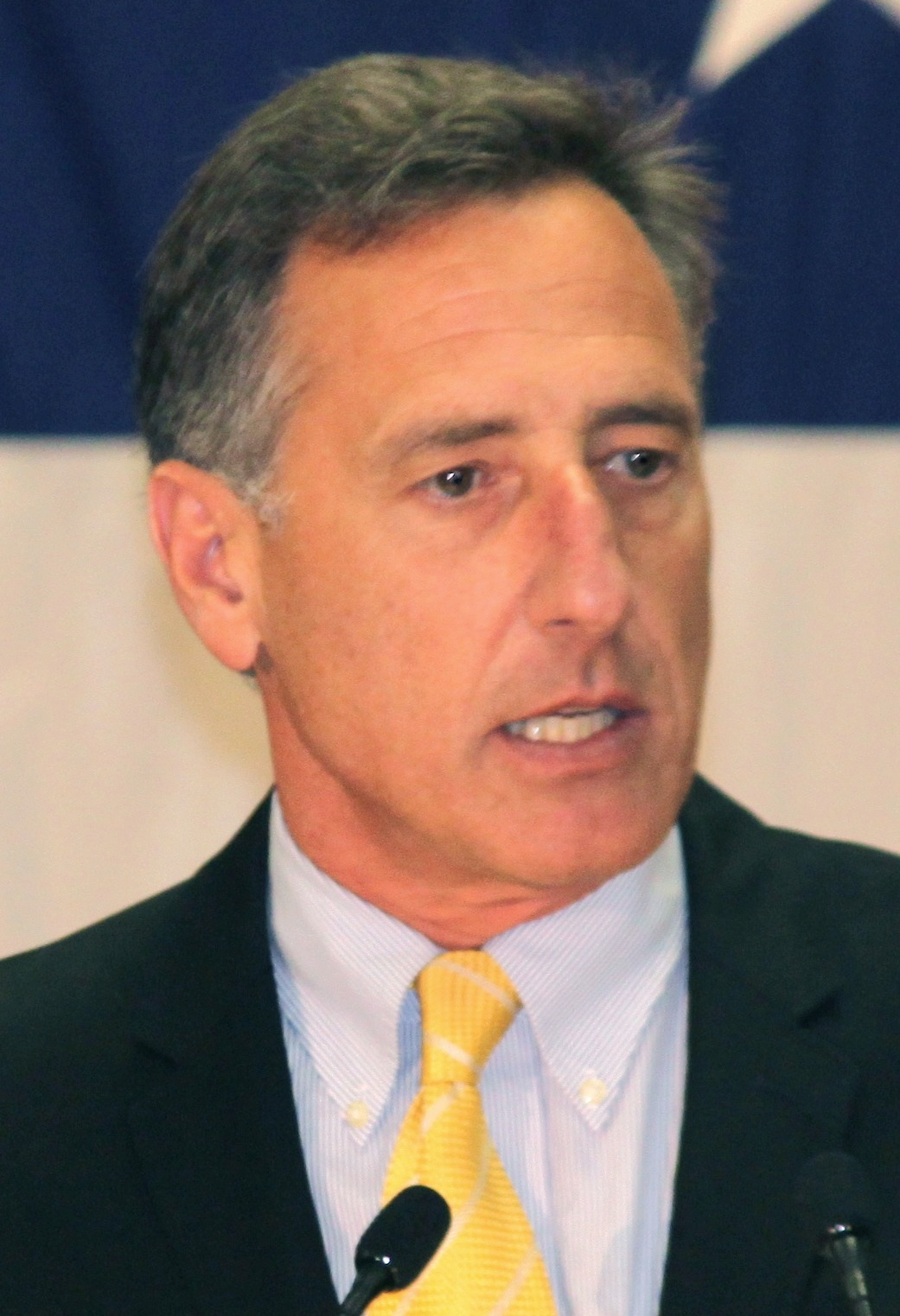

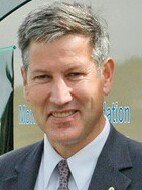
Nominee	Peter Shumlin	Brian Dubie
Party	Democratic	Republican
Electoral vote	145	28
Popular vote	119,543	115,212
Percentage	49.48%	47.69%
- Shumlin: 40–50% 50–60% 60–70% 70–80% 80–90% Dubie: 40–50% 50–60% 60–70% 70–80% 80–90%
Governor before election
Jim Douglas
Republican
Elected Governor
Peter Shumlin
Democratic

The 2010 Vermont gubernatorial general election took place on November 2. Vermont and New Hampshire are the only two states where the governor serves a two-year term instead of four. Primary elections took place on August 24.

Incumbent Republican governor Jim Douglas was not a candidate for re-election. Brian Dubie, the incumbent lieutenant governor, was the Republican nominee. The Democratic nomination was won by Peter Shumlin, the President pro tempore of the Vermont Senate.

The result was a 119,543 (49.5 percent) to 115,212 (47.7 percent) plurality for Shumlin. Several minor candidates got between 600 and 2,000 votes each. In accordance with the Vermont Constitution, if no candidate receives a majority, the contest is decided by the Vermont General Assembly. In such races, the combined Vermont House and Senate almost always chooses the candidate who won a plurality. Dubie indicated on November 3 that he did not intend to ask for a recount or contest the election in the legislature, and conceded to Shumlin. On January 6, 2011, with 173 of 180 members voting, 87 votes were necessary for a choice. The General Assembly elected Shumlin on the first ballot, 145–28.

== Republican primary ==
=== Candidate ===
- Brian Dubie, lieutenant governor

== Democratic primary ==
=== Candidates ===
- Susan Bartlett, state senator
- Matt Dunne, Google executive and former state senator
- Deborah Markowitz, secretary of state of Vermont
- Doug Racine, state senator, former lieutenant governor and nominee for governor in 2002
- Peter Shumlin, Senate president pro tempore

Peter Shumlin won the Democratic primary according to the uncertified tabulation of statewide votes released by the Office of the Secretary of State on August 27, 2010, by 197 votes over Doug Racine, who requested a recount. The recount began September 8. Racine conceded on September 10.

=== Results ===
Results by county: Shumlin—50–60% Shumlin—30–40% Racine—30–40% Markowitz—30–40% Dunne—30–40% Dunne—40–50%

Democratic primary results
Party	Candidate	Votes	%
Democratic	Peter Shumlin	18,276	24.8
Democratic	Doug Racine	18,079	24.6
Democratic	Deborah Markowitz	17,579	23.9
Democratic	Matt Dunne	15,323	20.8
Democratic	Susan Bartlett	3,759	5.1
Democratic	Write-in	560	0.8
Total votes		73,576	100

== Progressive primary ==
=== Candidates ===
- Martha Abbott, state party chair; Abbott won the primary, then withdrew from the election, so the party did not have a candidate on the ballot. The party had promised not to play a "spoiler" role in the election if Shumlin supported single-payer health care, which he did.

=== Results ===
Vermont Progressive primary results
Party	Candidate	Votes	%
Progressive	Martha Abbott	257	69.6
Progressive	Write-in	112	30.4
Total votes		369	100

== Independent and third-party candidates ==
- Cris Ericson, United States Marijuana Party
- Dan Feliciano, Independent
- Ben Mitchell, Liberty Union Party
- Em Payton, Independent
- Dennis Steele, Independent

== General election ==
=== Predictions ===
Source	Ranking	As of
Cook Political Report	Tossup	October 14, 2010
Rothenberg	Tilt D (flip)	October 28, 2010
RealClearPolitics	Tossup	November 1, 2010
Sabato's Crystal Ball	Lean D (flip)	October 28, 2010
CQ Politics	Tossup	October 28, 2010

=== Polling ===
Poll source	Dates administered	Brian Dubie (R)	Peter Shumlin (D)
Rasmussen Reports	October 28, 2010	45%	50%
Vermont Public Radio	October 12, 2010	44%	43%
Rasmussen Reports	September 13, 2010	46%	49%
Rasmussen Reports	June 17, 2010	55%	36%
Rasmussen Reports	March 18, 2010	51%	33%

=== Results ===
County flips: Republican Hold / Democratic Flip

2010 Vermont gubernatorial election
Party	Candidate	Votes	%	±%
Democratic	Peter Shumlin	119,543	49.48%	+27.8%
Republican	Brian Dubie	115,212	47.69%	−5.7%
Independent	Dennis Steele	1,917	0.79%	n/a
Marijuana	Cris Ericson	1,819	0.75%	n/a
Independent	Dan Feliciano	1,341	0.56%	n/a
Independent	Emily Peyton	684	0.28%	n/a
Liberty Union	Ben Mitchell	429	0.18%	−0.33%
Write-in		660	0.27%	n/a
Plurality		4,331		
Total votes		241,605	100.00%	
Democratic gain from Republican				

==== By county ====
County	Peter Shumlin Democratic		Brian Dubie Republican		Various candidates Other parties	
County	#	%	#	%	#	%
Addison	7,739	50.8%	7,129	46.8%	370	2.4%
Bennington	7,662	55.3%	5,700	41.2%	484	3.4%
Caledonia	4,353	39.0%	6,392	57.3%	409	3.7%
Chittenden	32,280	52.4%	28,050	45.6%	1,216	2.0%
Essex	797	34.4%	1,413	61.0%	107	4.6%
Franklin	5,999	36.8%	9,840	60.4%	451	2.8%
Grand Isle	1,495	42.8%	1,906	54.6%	92	2.6%
Lamoille	4,564	47.6%	4,755	49.6%	274	2.9%
Orange	5,678	49.5%	5,412	47.2%	378	3.3%
Orleans	3,874	41.1%	5,235	55.5%	325	3.4%
Rutland	9,483	41.6%	12,583	55.2%	738	3.3%
Washington	13,275	53.1%	10,973	43.9%	758	3.0%
Windham	10,442	60.6%	6,278	36.4%	515	3.0%
Windsor	11,902	53.7%	9,546	43.0%	733	3.3%
Totals	119,543	49.5%	115,212	47.7%	6,850	2.8%

Counties that flipped from Republican to Democratic

- Addison (largest municipality: Middlebury)
- Bennington (largest municipality: Bennington)
- Chittenden (largest municipality: Burlington)
- Orange (largest city: Randolph)
- Washington (largest municipality: Barre)
- Windham (largest municipality: Brattleboro)
- Windsor (largest municipality: Hartford)

== General Assembly results ==
Vermont's Constitution requires the Vermont General Assembly to select if no candidate obtains a majority. The combined Vermont House and Senate almost always chooses the candidate who won a plurality. The legislature officially elected Peter Shumlin on January 6, 2011.

2010 gubernatorial election results, Legislative Joint Assembly
Party	Candidate	Votes	%	±%
Democratic	Peter Shumlin	145	80.6%	N/A
Republican	Brian Dubie	28	15.6%	N/A
Total votes		173 of 180	96.2%	N/A

== See also ==
- List of governors of Vermont
- 2010 United States gubernatorial elections
