= 2010 United States Senate election in Vermont =

- November 2, 2010
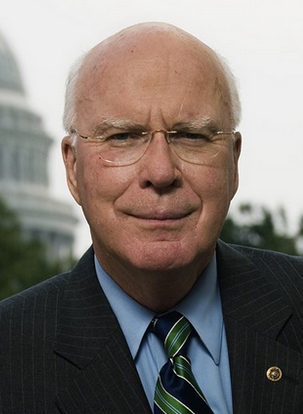

Nominee	Patrick Leahy	Len Britton
Party	Democratic	Republican
Popular vote	151,281	72,699
Percentage	64.36%	30.93%
- Leahy: 30–40% 40–50% 50–60% 60–70% 70–80% 80–90% Britton: 40–50% 50–60%
U.S. senator before election
Patrick Leahy
Democratic
Elected U.S. Senator
Patrick Leahy
Democratic

The 2010 United States Senate election in Vermont took place on November 2, 2010, alongside other elections to the United States Senate in other states as well as elections to the United States House of Representatives and various state and local elections. Incumbent Democratic U.S. Senator Patrick Leahy was re-elected to a seventh term.

== Democratic primary ==
=== Candidates ===
- Daniel Freilich, military doctor (also running as an independent)
- Patrick Leahy, incumbent U.S. Senator

=== Results ===
Democratic primary results
Party	Candidate	Votes	%
Democratic	Patrick Leahy (incumbent)	64,177	89.06%
Democratic	Daniel Freilich	7,886	10.94%
Total votes		72,063	100.0%

== General election ==
=== Candidates ===
- Len Britton (R), businessman
- Stephen Cain (I)
- Pete Diamondstone (Socialist)
- Cris Ericson (U.S. Marijuana), two-time former candidate for U.S. Senate
- Daniel Freilich (I), military doctor
- Patrick Leahy (D), incumbent U.S. Senator
- Johenry Nunes (I), military education and training manager

=== Campaign ===
First elected in 1974, Leahy was at the time the first and only Democrat elected to the U.S. Senate from Vermont. He won his last two re-election campaigns with at least 70% of the vote. He is the second-most-senior member of Congress. In a June 2010 poll, the incumbent was viewed very favorably by 52% of the state. 52% of the state opposed repeal of the Affordable Care Act (ACA) and 50% opposed Arizona's immigration law. Obama's approval rating in the poll was 62%. Obama carried Vermont with 67% of the vote in 2008.

His Republican opponent was Len Britton, a businessman who had never run for public office before. As of August 2010, he had released two TV ads, criticizing Obama's stimulus and the deficits. His campaign manager admitted, "Len is an unknown candidate and we are rigorously running on a difficult campaign schedule."

=== Debates ===
- October 14: All four candidates on CCTV in Burlington
- October 19: Two candidates on Vermont Public Radio

=== Predictions ===
Source	Ranking	As of
Cook Political Report	Solid D	October 26, 2010
Rothenberg	Safe D	October 22, 2010
RealClearPolitics	Safe D	October 26, 2010
Sabato's Crystal Ball	Safe D	October 21, 2010
CQ Politics	Safe D	October 26, 2010

=== Polling ===
Poll source	Date(s) administered	Sample size	Margin of error	Patrick Leahy (D)	Len Britton (R)	Other	Undecided
Rasmussen Reports	June 17, 2010	500	± 4.5%	64%	29%	3%	4%
Rasmussen Reports	September 13, 2010	500	± 4.5%	63%	32%	2%	4%
Vermont Public Radio/Mason-Dixon	October 11–13, 2010	625	± 4.0%	62%	27%	4%	7%

=== Fundraising ===
Candidate (party)	Receipts	Disbursements	Cash on hand	Debt
Patrick Leahy (D)	$3,469,878	$2,090,603	$2,598,061	$0
Len Britton (R)	$199,813	$144,541	$55,270	$69,833
Source: Federal Election Commission

=== Results ===

United States Senate election in Vermont, 2010
Party	Candidate	Votes	%	±%
Democratic	Patrick Leahy (incumbent)	151,281	64.36%	−6.27%
Republican	Len Britton	72,699	30.93%	+6.38%
Independent	Daniel Freilich	3,544	1.51%	N/A
Marijuana	Cris Ericson	2,731	1.16%	N/A
Independent	Stephen Cain	2,356	1.00%	N/A
Socialist	Peter Diamondstone	1,433	0.61%	N/A
Independent	Johenry Nunes	1,021	0.43%	N/A
Majority		78,528	33.43%	
Total votes		235,065	100.00%	
Democratic hold		Swing		

==== By county ====
County	Patrick Leahy Democratic		Len Britton Republican		Various candidates Other parties	
County	#	%	#	%	#	%
Addison	9,904	66.55%	4,397	29.54%	582	3.91%
Bennington	8,517	63.15%	3,873	28.72%	1,096	8.13%
Caledonia	6,058	56.04%	4,247	39.28%	506	4.68%
Chittenden	40,837	68.21%	16,716	27.92%	2,314	3.87%
Essex	1,173	52.06%	939	41.68%	141	6.26%
Franklin	9,629	60.54%	5,582	35.1%	693	4.36%
Grand Isle	2,083	60.52%	1,159	33.67%	200	5.81%
Lamoille	6,205	66.03%	2,844	30.26%	348	3.71%
Orange	6,894	61.87%	3,777	33.9%	471	4.23%
Orleans	5,517	60.31%	3,176	34.72%	455	4.97%
Rutland	12,265	55.36%	8,808	39.75%	1,083	4.89%
Washington	16,682	68.62%	6,541	26.9%	1,089	4.48%
Windham	11,587	69.32%	3,391	23.52%	1,197	7.16%
Windsor	13,390	64.31%	6,709	30.97%	1,023	4.72%
Totals	151,281	64.33%	72,699	30.91%	11,198	4.76%
