= Brian Dubie =

American politician from Vermont (born 1959)

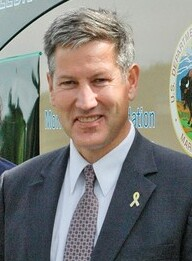

80th Lieutenant Governor of Vermont
- In office January 9, 2003 – January 6, 2011
- Governor: Jim Douglas
- Preceded by: Doug Racine
- Succeeded by: Phil Scott

Personal details
- Born: March 9, 1959 (age 67) Burlington, Vermont, U.S.
- Party: Republican
- Spouse: Penny Dubie
- Education: United States Air Force Academy; University of Vermont (BS)

Brian E. Dubie (born 9 March 1959) is an American politician who was the 80th lieutenant governor of Vermont from 2003 to 2011. He lost the 2010 election for governor of Vermont by fewer than 5,000 votes. He is a member of the Republican Party.

He is a captain for American Airlines and a strategic advisor to growing companies. In 2012, he retired from the United States Air Force Reserve with the rank of colonel.

== Education and early career ==
Brian Dubie attended public schools in Essex Junction, Vermont. He graduated from Essex Community Educational Center in 1977. He attended the United States Air Force Academy (1977–1980), returning to Vermont to join the Vermont Air National Guard and complete his degree work at the University of Vermont (UVM), where he earned a BS in mechanical engineering in 1982. He was president of the American Society of Mechanical Engineers’ UVM chapter.

== Aerospace and aviation ==
While a student at UVM, Dubie joined the Vermont Air National Guard. After graduation, he trained with the United States Air Force in the F-4 Phantom II and later the F-16 Fighting Falcon fighter aircraft. He continued to fly in the Air Guard as he began his career in the aerospace industry.

In 1982, Dubie joined Simmons Precision (now Goodrich Aerospace) in Vergennes, Vermont, where he was a project engineer and project manager. He developed fuel systems for military and commercial aircraft. In 1989, he left Simmons to fly for American Airlines, first in the McDonnell Douglas MD-80 aircraft, and currently in the Boeing 737-800. He has logged more than 10,000 hours in commercial aircraft.

As Vermont's lieutenant governor, Dubie founded the Vermont Aerospace and Aviation Association (VAAA) in August 2006.

In October 2006, Dubie was elected chair of Aerospace States Association, a national, non-partisan organization of lieutenant governors and governor-appointees from every state, representing the grassroots of American aerospace.

He was a member of the Sigma Phi Epsilon fraternity.

== Military ==
All told, Brian Dubie logged more than 2,500 hours in military fighter aircraft. He rose to the rank of lieutenant colonel in the Vermont Air National Guard, serving as instructor pilot, operations support flight commander of the 158th Fighter Wing. In 1998, he left the Air Guard to join the US Air Force Reserve, where he served as an emergency preparedness liaison officer in the National Security Emergency Preparedness Agency. Serving in that role, Dubie earned a Meritorious Service Medal, First Oak Cluster, for his actions at Ground Zero in New York City following the September 11 attacks. In September 2005, he served on the Gulf Coast in the relief effort for victims of Hurricane Katrina. He received the Meritorious Service Medal, Second Oak leaf Cluster, and the Air Force Commendation Medal, First Oak Leaf Cluster, for outstanding achievement at 1st Air Force Hurricane Katrina Operations Center. On June 2, 2012, Dubie retired from the military in a ceremony held at Camp Johnson, the Colchester headquarters of the Vermont National Guard.

== Political career ==
Dubie's first political experience came as a member of the Essex Junction School Board, in the same school system he had attended and where his children were enrolled. He served as a member from 1995 to 2000, and as chair from 1996 to 2000. His first run for lieutenant governor in 2000 was unsuccessful. He ran again and was elected in 2002, and won re-election by comfortable margins in 2004, 2006 and 2008.

The constitutional responsibilities of Vermont's lieutenant governor are to preside over the state senate and to act as governor when the governor is absent from the state or incapacitated.

== 2010 gubernatorial election ==
On October 1, 2009, Dubie announced his candidacy for Governor of Vermont in 2010 to succeed four-term governor Jim Douglas. In the general election on November 2, 2010, Dubie received 48% of the votes and Democrat Peter Shumlin 49%. On Wednesday November 3, Dubie indicated that he would not seek a recount, and conceded the election. The Vermont General Assembly (150 House members and 30 senators) selects the winner in contests for governor, lieutenant governor and treasurer when no candidate receives a majority of the vote. On January 6, 2011, the General Assembly elected Shumlin, 145 votes to 28.

== Personal life ==
Dubie and his wife Penny have four children: daughters Emily and Casey, and sons Jack and Matt. Dubie's brother, Michael Dubie, served as Adjutant General of Vermont and deputy commander of United States Northern Command, attaining the rank of lieutenant general in the United States Air Force before retiring in 2015.

Political offices
Preceded by Doug Racine	Lieutenant Governor of Vermont; 2003–2011	Succeeded by Phil Scott
Party political offices
Preceded by Barbara Snelling	Republican nominee for Lieutenant Governor of Vermont; 2000, 2002, 2004, 2006, 2008	Succeeded by Phil Scott
Preceded by Jim Douglas	Republican nominee for Governor of Vermont; 2010	Succeeded by Randy Brock
