= Con Hogan =

Con Hogan may refer to:

- Con Hogan (footballer, born 1881) (1881 – 1939), Australian Rules footballer
- Con Hogan (footballer, born 1903) (1903 – 1987), Australian Rules footballer
- Con Hogan (public official) (d. 2018), American public official in Vermont
- Cornelius Hogan (1878 – 1909), Maltese footballer
