= Deborah Markowitz =

American politician and environmental leader

Deb Markowitz
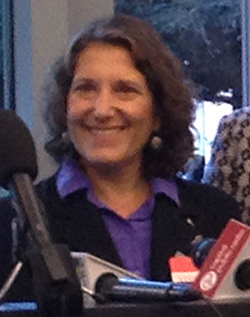

38th Secretary of State of Vermont
- In office January 1999 – January 6, 2011
- Governor: Howard Dean; Jim Douglas; Peter Shumlin
- Preceded by: James F. Milne
- Succeeded by: Jim Condos

Personal details
- Born: September 14, 1961 (age 65) Tarrytown, New York, U.S.
- Party: Democratic
- Spouse: Paul Markowitz
- Children: 3
- Education: University of Vermont (BA); Georgetown University (JD)

Deborah Markowitz (born September 14, 1961) Has been a leader in government and the nonprofit sectors focusing on environmental sustainability, conservation and good government. She currently Serves on the Board of VELCO, a transmission utility that operates the electric grid in Vermont. She is also a part time lecturer at the University of Vermont Rubenstein School of Environment and Natural Resources and has a small Executive Coaching practice for women leaders. Prior to this, Markowitz served as the state director for The Nature Conservancy in Massachusetts. From 2011 to 2017 Markowitz served as the Secretary of the Vermont Agency of Natural Resources. She was appointed by Vermont Governor Peter Shumlin. Markowitz was elected six times to serve as the Secretary of State of Vermont. Although she is a member of the Democratic Party, she won the nomination of both the Republican and Democratic Parties in two of her races.

== Early life, education and career ==
Markowitz was born in Tarrytown, New York, on September 14, 1961. She attended Edgemont High School in Scarsdale, New York and graduated with honors from the University of Vermont, with a degree in philosophy and political science in 1983, and earned her Juris Doctor degree from Georgetown University Law Center in 1987, magna cum laude. As a law student at Georgetown, Markowitz did an oral history of then DC Circuit Court Judge, Ruth Bader Ginsburg. Based on this work, she published In Pursuit of Equality, One Women's Work to Change the Law, which is considered a seminal work by legal scholars analyzing the development of women's rights in America and the important role of Justice Ginsburg.

After law school Markowitz returned to Vermont to clerk with Justice Louis Peck of the Vermont Supreme Court. Following this clerkship she joined the law firm Langrock, Sperry & Wool. In 1990, the Vermont League of Cities and Towns (VLCT) established its Municipal Law Center, for which Markowitz was hired as its first director. She has been a member of the adjunct faculty at the Vermont Law School and Woodbury College.

== Vermont Secretary of State ==
Markowitz was first elected Vermont's Secretary of State in 1998, defeating a two-term incumbent and becoming the first woman elected Secretary of State in the Vermont.

As Secretary of State, Markowitz advocated for, and implemented, election reforms that increased early voting opportunities and made it easier to register to vote. She built a statewide voter registration database, and upgraded Vermont's voting equipment. Markowitz also established the Safe at Home program; an address confidentiality program to protect victims of rape, abuse and stalking from being tracked down through the state's public records. She consolidated the state Archives with the state records department, and oversaw the construction of a new State Archive and Record Center facility. Markowitz was perhaps best known for her efforts to advance civic engagement of Vermonters. She developed civic educational materials and programs for Vermont's school children, and she published a monthly Newsletter and a dozen handbooks for Vermont's local officials, answering their questions about municipal law and practice. Markowitz also established the Vermont Public Service Award program to recognize local officials who served for 20 years or more.

Markowitz served as president of the National Association of Secretaries of State. She served on the Board of Advisors of the Federal Election Assistance Commission and she served on the boards of the Central Vermont Community Action Agency, the Vermont Girl Scout Council, the Vermont Housing and Conservation Board and the Vermont Council on Rural Development.

== Vermont gubernatorial election ==
Markowitz was a candidate in the 2010 Democratic primary for Vermont Governor. She placed third with 17,503 votes, behind the winner, Peter Shumlin, with 18,276 votes, and second-place Doug Racine, with 18,079 votes. Markowitz was appointed by Governor Shumlin to serve as his Secretary of the Agency of Natural Resources.

== Agency of Natural Resources ==
Markowitz served as Secretary of the Vermont Agency of Natural Resources, from 2011 - 2017. As Secretary, Markowitz was responsible for protecting Vermont's environment, natural resources and wildlife and for maintaining Vermont's forests and state parks. In this role she shaped the environmental agenda of the state, focusing on the challenges of climate change, habitat fragmentation and the need to make Vermont more resilient to flooding. Secretary Markowitz served as the Chair of Vermont's Climate Cabinet and represented Vermont on the White House Task Force on Climate Preparedness and Resilience. She represented Vermont in State and Regional Leadership events at the Paris Climate Summit and in Marrakech. She served on the Board of the Regional Greenhouse Gas Initiative and on the executive board of the Environmental Council of the States.

Markowitz received a 2017 Lifetime Achievement Award from EPA Region 1, where they noted "Deb became secretary of the Agency for Natural Resources in 2011, introducing one of the most productive and innovative eras in the agency's history. She focused on challenges from climate change and water quality to forest health and recycling rates. When Deb arrived, the organization was shell-shocked from years of budget cutting and rotating secretaries. Within a year, it had entered a sustained period of innovative environmental policy improvement. Over the next six years, Deb and her commissioners and staff secured protection for shorelines; universal recycling requirements; a Lake Champlain cleanup plan, and greater attention to forest fragmentation."

Markowitz has served on the Boards of Advisors for the Georgetown Climate Center, Antioch's Center for Climate Preparedness and Community Resilience, for the University of Vermont's Rubenstein School of Environment and Natural Resources, and as a Trustee of the Vermont Chapter of the Nature Conservancy. Markowitz is the founder of the Vermont Women's Leadership Initiative and Vermont Parks Forever – the Foundation for Vermont's State Parks. She has been recognized nationally for her leadership by being awarded an Aspen Institute Rodel fellowship and the Kennedy School of Governments’ Cahn Fellowship.

== Personal life ==
Markowitz resides in Montpelier, Vermont, with her husband and three children.

Party political offices
Preceded by James F. Milne	Democratic nominee for Secretary of State of Vermont; 1998, 2000, 2002, 2004, 2006, 2008	Succeeded by Jim Condos
Preceded by Mike Bertrand	Republican nominee for Secretary of State of Vermont; 2004	Succeeded by Cheryl Moomey
Political offices
Preceded by James F. Milne	Secretary of State of Vermont; 1998–2011	Succeeded by James C. Condos
