= National Rural Development Partnership =

The National Rural Development Partnership (NRDP) is a collaborative effort by representatives of the United States federal, state, local, and tribal governments, the private sector, and the nonprofit sector to promote rural development across the nation. The principal component of the Partnership is the State Rural Development Councils. The Partnership was authorized by the 2002 farm bill (P.L. 107–171, 6021) as an amendment of the Consolidated Agriculture and Rural Development Act of 1972 (7 U.S.C. 2008m). The law authorizes appropriations of $10 million per fiscal year from 2002 to 2006 for the Partnership.

== See also ==
- National Rural Economic Development Institute
