= Donald M. Hooper =

American politician

Donald M. "Don" Hooper (born October 2, 1945) is a Vermont educator, environmental activist, and political figure. He served in the Vermont House of Representatives for four terms, and as Secretary of State of Vermont for one.

== Early life ==
Hooper was born in Hartford, Connecticut on October 2, 1945. He graduated from Harvard University with a Bachelor of Arts degree in 1968, and he received a Master of Education degree from Harvard in 1973.

In his early career, Hooper was a Peace Corps teacher in Botswana. He later served as coordinator of instruction and acting director for the Central Vermont region of the Community College of Vermont. He also worked as director of operations for the Vermont Natural Resources Council.

== Political career ==
A longtime resident of Brookfield, Vermont, Hooper was elected to the Vermont House of Representatives as a Democrat in 1984. He was reelected three times, and served from January 1985 to January 1993. During his House career, Hooper served as chairman of the Government Operations Committee, and served on the Natural Resources and Ways and Means Committees.

In 1992, Hooper was the successful Democratic nominee for Secretary of State. He defeated Republican nominee James F. Milne, and succeeded Jim Douglas, who ran unsuccessfully for the US Senate.

Hooper served one term, January 1993 to January 1995. In 1994, Hooper was defeated for reelection by Milne, who went on to serve two terms.

== Later career ==
Hooper later worked as the Northeast Regional Representative for the National Wildlife Federation. He retired in 2016.

== Publications ==
Don Hooper is the illustrator of I Could Hardly Keep From Laughing: An Illustrated Collection of Vermont Humor, co-authored with Bill Mares. Publication date: December 7, 2021, by Rootstock Publishing, of Montpelier, Vermont.

== Family ==
Hooper is married to Allison Hooper, the co-founder of the Vermont Butter and Cheese Company. They are the parents of three sons, Miles, Sam, and Jay who is a state representative in Vermont.

== Sources ==
=== Internet ===
- "Biography, Donald M. Hooper" (PDF). Vermont State Archives. Montpelier, VT: Vermont Secretary of State.
- "Biography, James F. Milne" (PDF). Secretary of State James F. Milne Records, 1995 to 1999. Montpelier, VT: Vermont Secretary of State.
- Clerk of the Vermont House of Representatives (2011). "Secretaries of State, 1778-2011". History of Elected Officials. Vermont House of Representatives.
- Cockrum, Zach (June 20, 2016). "National Wildlife Federation Recognizes Don Hooper of Brookfield, Vermont for Environmental Leadership". NWF News. Washington, DC: National Wildlife Federation.
- "Biography, Allison Hooper". Shelburne Farms. Shelburne, VT.
- Freese, Alicia (November 30, 2016). "In With the New: Two College-to-Statehouse Reps Prepare to Serve". Seven Days. Burlington, VT.

Party political offices
Preceded by Jim Douglas	Democratic nominee for Secretary of State of Vermont; 1992, 1994	Succeeded by James F. Milne
Political offices
Preceded by Jim Douglas	Secretary of State of Vermont; 1993–1995	Succeeded by James F. Milne
