= Vermont Department of Health =

Government organization in Burlington, United States

Vermont Department of Public Health

Agency overview
- Jurisdiction: Vermont
- Agency executives: Mark Levine, Commissioner of Health; Tracy Dolan, Deputy Health Commissioner; Kelly Dougherty, Deputy Health Commissioner
- Parent agency: Vermont Agency of Human Services
- Website: www.healthvermont.gov//

The Vermont Department of Health is a government department responsible for the health of the U.S. state of Vermont. It is a sub-division of the Vermont Agency of Human Services. As of March 2017, the Department of Health is led by Mark Levine, MD. Dr. Levine was appointed the Commissioner of Health by Vermont state governor Phil Scott.

== District offices ==
Vermont's Health department has a centralized structure; this structure typical does not have a separate local public health department (such as county level government) and local health units are state employees. The central office is located in Burlington, Vermont with several local health departments in 12 communities including Barre, Bennington, Brattleboro, Burlington, Middlebury, Morrisville, Newport, Rutland, Springfield, St. Albans, St. Johnsbury, and White River Junction.

== Public Health Department Accreditation ==
The Vermont Department of Health became a national accredited public health department in 2014 by the Public Health Accreditation Board.
