= Monkton, Vermont =

- Town
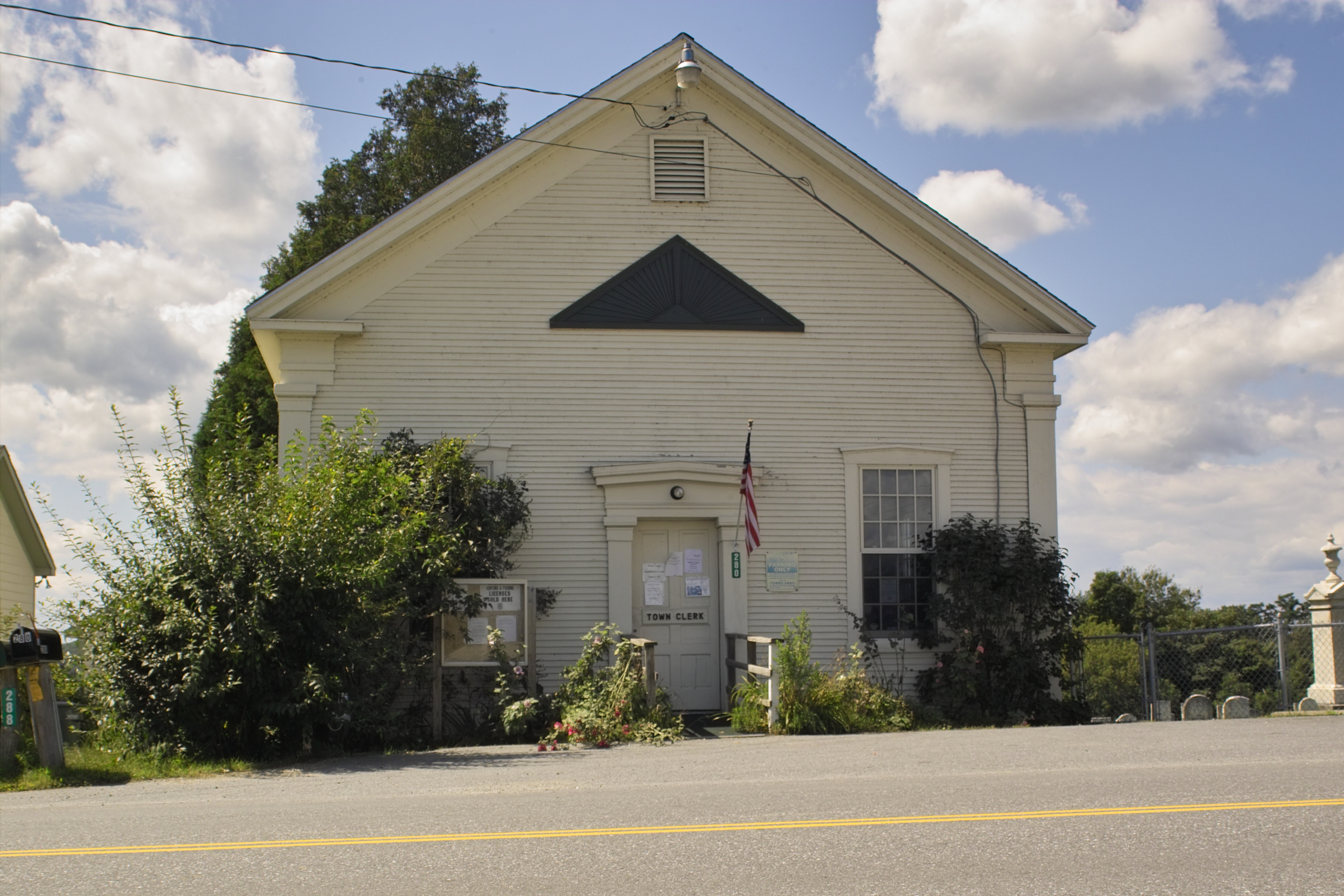
- Old Monkton town hall

- Flag

- Location in Addison County and the state of Vermont
- Coordinates: 44°13′52″N 73°07′55″W
- Country: United States
- State: Vermont
- County: Addison
- Communities: Monkton; Monkton Ridge; East Monkton; Barnumtown

Area
  - Total: 36.3 sq mi (93.9 km^{2})
  - Land: 35.9 sq mi (92.9 km^{2})
  - Water: 0.39 sq mi (1.0 km^{2})
- Elevation: 755 ft (230 m)

Population (2020)
  - Total: 2,079
  - Density: 58/sq mi (22.4/km^{2})
- Time zone: UTC-5 (Eastern (EST))
  - Summer (DST): UTC-4 (EDT)
- ZIP codes: 05469 (Monkton); 05443 (Bristol); 05472 (New Haven); 05473 (North Ferrisburgh); 05461 (Hinesburg)
- Area code: 802
- FIPS code: 50-45550
- GNIS feature ID: 1462150
- Website: monktonvt.com

Monkton is a town in Addison County, Vermont, United States. The population was 2,079 at the 2020 census.

== History ==
Monkton was chartered in 1762.

Iron ore deposits around Monkton provided iron for cannonballs used by Macdonough's fleet, which was built in Vergennes during the War of 1812.

Quaker minister Joseph Hoag and his wife Huldah Hoag are buried in the Quaker cemetery in Monkton Boro.

Monkton's observance of the U.S. Bicentennial began with a number of small community projects which culminated with a two-day extravaganza on August 21 and 22, 1976. The first of the preliminary projects was to place American flags on all the veterans' graves in the town cemeteries, with the second the making of over forty quilts. Finally, two banners were made to announce the upcoming weekend of events.

In 2012, Monkton observed its 250th anniversary. During the annual Town Hall meeting on March 6th, the town chose a town flag from a selection of five entries submitted by residents.

== Geography ==
Monkton is located in northern Addison County. It is situated on the eastern edge of the Champlain Valley, in the foothills of the Green Mountains. It is bordered by the town of Ferrisburgh to the west, New Haven and Bristol to the south, and Starksboro to the east. To the north are the towns of Charlotte and Hinesburg in Chittenden County.

According to the United States Census Bureau, Monkton has a total area of 36.3 square miles (93.9 km^{2}), of which 35.9 square miles (92.9 km^{2}) is land and 0.39 square miles (1.0 km^{2}), or 1.04%, is water. Monkton is home to Cedar Lake, located north of the center of town between the communities of Monkton Boro and Monkton Ridge.

== Conservation ==
=== Wildlife underpasses ===
In 2005, concerned citizens initiated a study on the impact of vehicles on the local amphibian population. Local wildlife biologist Steve Parren, the town, the University of Vermont, state agencies, and conservation groups, collaborated on the construction of wildlife underpasses at a key migratory point for animals and amphibians.

The species impacted by the project included the blue-spotted salamander, a species of special concern in Vermont.

After completing the project, The Vermont Transportation Agency (VTrans) created a video showing the two under passes located on Monkton Road.

An article published in the August, 2025 edition of The Journal for Nature Conservation reported an 80% decrease in amphibian mortality and a 94% reduction for non-arboreal species. The Vermont Reptile and Amphibian Atlas, who was involved in the project, has since created a story map documenting the history and the success of the conservation effort led to national attention from outlets such as the Smithsonian Magazine and Forbes.

=== Land conservation ===
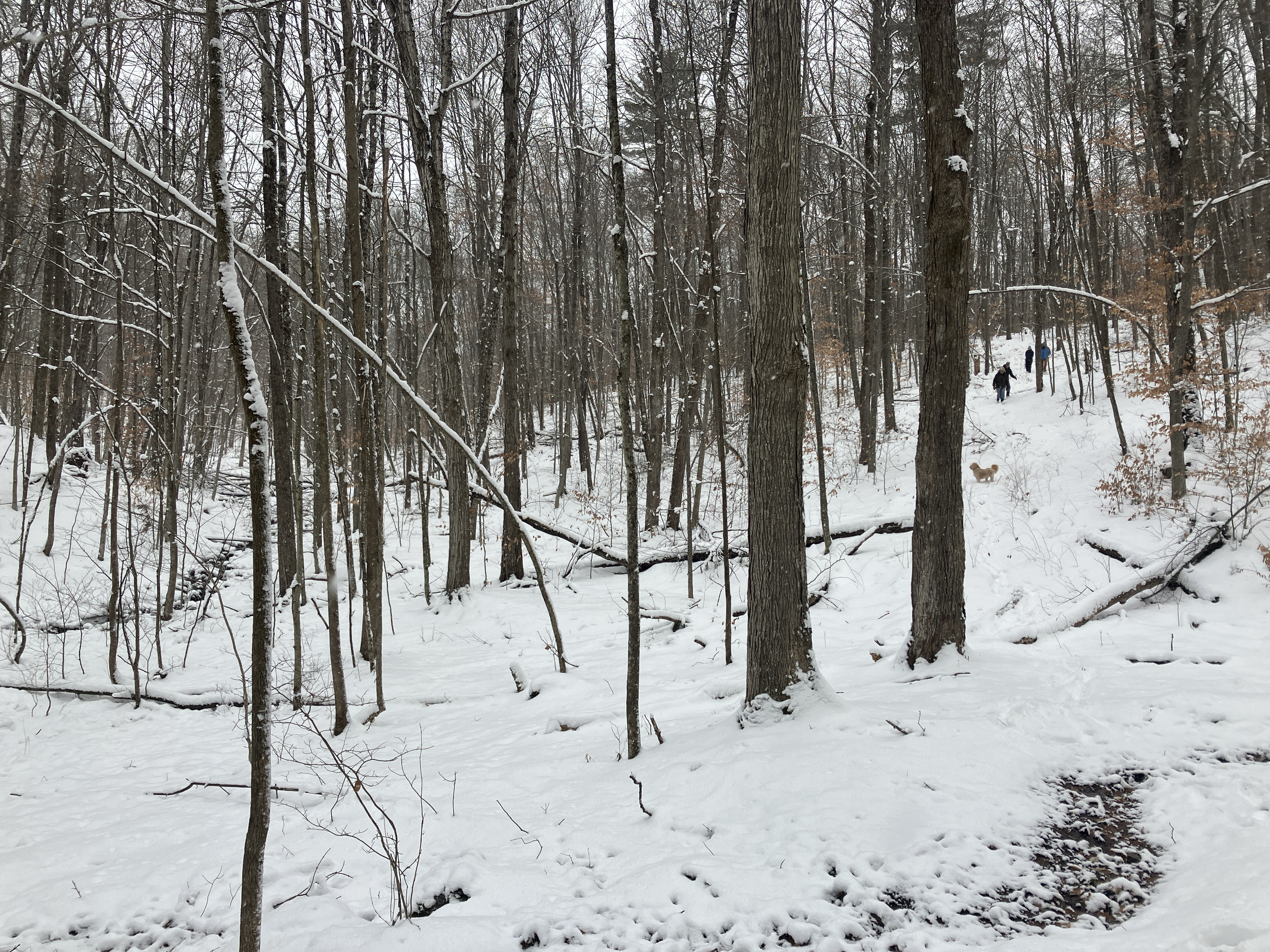
Locals walk through the Town Forest in December, 2025.

In partnership with the Vermont Land Trust, the town of Monkton purchased 450 acres of land from the A. Johnson lumber company in 2024. Representatives of the company shared that the land was the site of the iron ore deposits used for cannonballs in the War of 1812. Kaolin clay was also once extracted from the land and, like much of the surrounding area, it had once been deforested for grazing pasture.

The land is accessible from a parking area and includes walking trails through 15 forest types, the most common being Red Oak-Northern Hardwood Forest. The land also includes a rare occurrence of Dry Oak-Hickory-Hophornbeam Forest.

The area is connected to 664 conserved acres in Bristol, Vermont managed by The Watershed Center.

== Community organizations ==
====== The Monkton Community Coffeehouse ======
Since the rural town lacks many physical meeting spaces, the Coffeehouse was founded in 2007 by Jonathan Corcoran and other residents to build community through a variety of events. The organization notably organized the Monkton Flag project and Monkton Talk (2009-2013) a community forum later replaced by Front Porch Forum.

====== Cedar Lake Homemakers Club ======
This club is intended to be an informal means of sharing ideas and methods for better homemaking through charity work and donations.

====== Florona Grange ======
The Grange, which helped sponsor 1976 Bicentennial events, was organized at the Town Hall on July 17, 1940, with 96 members. Throughout World War II, the Grange helped in the war effort and supported the servicemen and women.

====== Friendly Circle ======
This club's community outreach is expressed by visits to the sick, gifts to the needy and annual pre-Thanksgiving dinner for senior citizens.

====== Monkton Museum and Historical Society ======
The purpose of this organization is to encourage and make possible the study of Monkton history and to provide a central location where Monkton residents can share their interests in local history.

====== Monkton Volunteer Fire Department ======
The fire department was founded on February 9, 1972, at a public meeting in the Monkton Central School.

====== Monkton Parents Teachers Organization ======
The PTO has been a town organization for many years.

== Demographics ==
Historical population
Census	Pop.	Note	%±
1790	450		—
1800	880		95.6%
1810	1,248		41.8%
1820	1,152		−7.7%
1830	1,384		20.1%
1840	1,310		−5.3%
1850	1,246		−4.9%
1860	1,123		−9.9%
1870	1,006		−10.4%
1880	1,025		1.9%
1890	847		−17.4%
1900	912		7.7%
1910	724		−20.6%
1920	671		−7.3%
1930	683		1.8%
1940	575		−15.8%
1950	520		−9.6%
1960	551		6.0%
1970	765		38.8%
1980	1,201		57.0%
1990	1,482		23.4%
2000	1,759		18.7%
2010	1,980		12.6%
2020	2,079		5.0%
U.S. Decennial Census

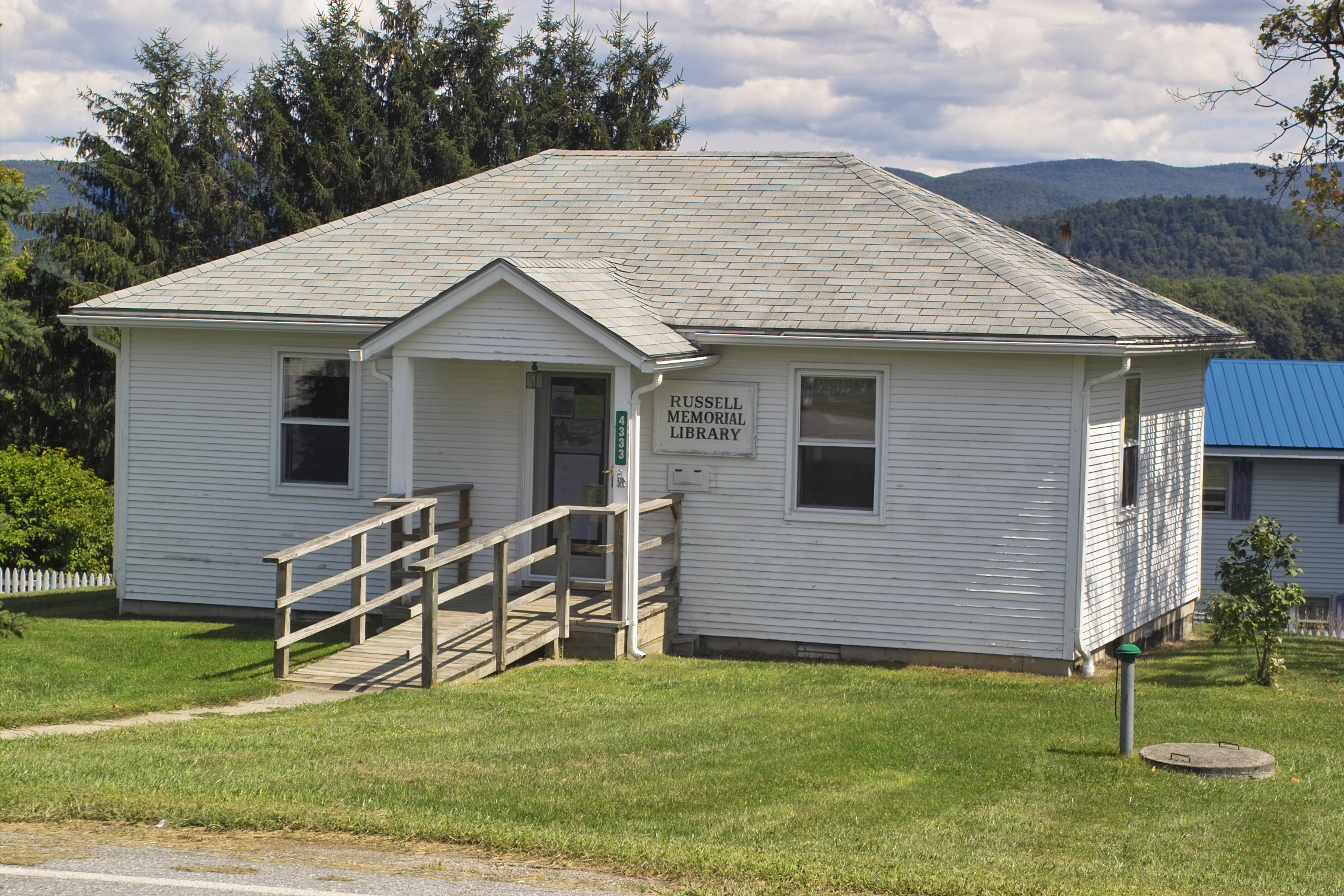
Russell Memorial Library

As of the census of 2000, there were 1,759 people, 642 households, and 503 families residing in the town. The population density was 48.8 people per square mile (18.9/km^{2}). There were 687 housing units at an average density of 19.1 per square mile (7.4/km^{2}). The racial makeup of the town was 98.64% White, 0.17% African American, 0.23% Native American, 0.40% Asian, 0.06% from other races, and 0.51% from two or more races. Hispanic or Latino of any race were 0.51% of the population.

There were 642 households, out of which 41.4% had children under the age of 18 living with them, 69.3% were married couples living together, 6.1% had a female householder with no husband present, and 21.5% were non-families. 15.0% of all households were made up of individuals, and 4.5% had someone living alone who was 65 years of age or older. The average household size was 2.74 and the average family size was 3.06.

In the town, the age distribution of the population shows 28.5% under the age of 18, 4.8% from 18 to 24, 32.7% from 25 to 44, 27.8% from 45 to 64, and 6.1% who were 65 years of age or older. The median age was 37 years. For every 100 females, there were 97.9 males. For every 100 females age 18 and over, there were 91.3 males.

The median income for a household in the town was $53,807, and the median income for a family was $58,611. Males had a median income of $38,424 versus $27,179 for females. The per capita income for the town was $22,256. About 1.9% of families and 3.6% of the population were below the poverty line, including 3.8% of those under age 18 and 8.7% of those age 65 or over.

== Notable people ==
- Frank Dupee, baseball player
- Eva Munson Smith (1843–1915), composer, poet, author
- Pete Sutherland (1951–2022), folklorist
