= 2002 Vermont gubernatorial election =

- November 5, 2002
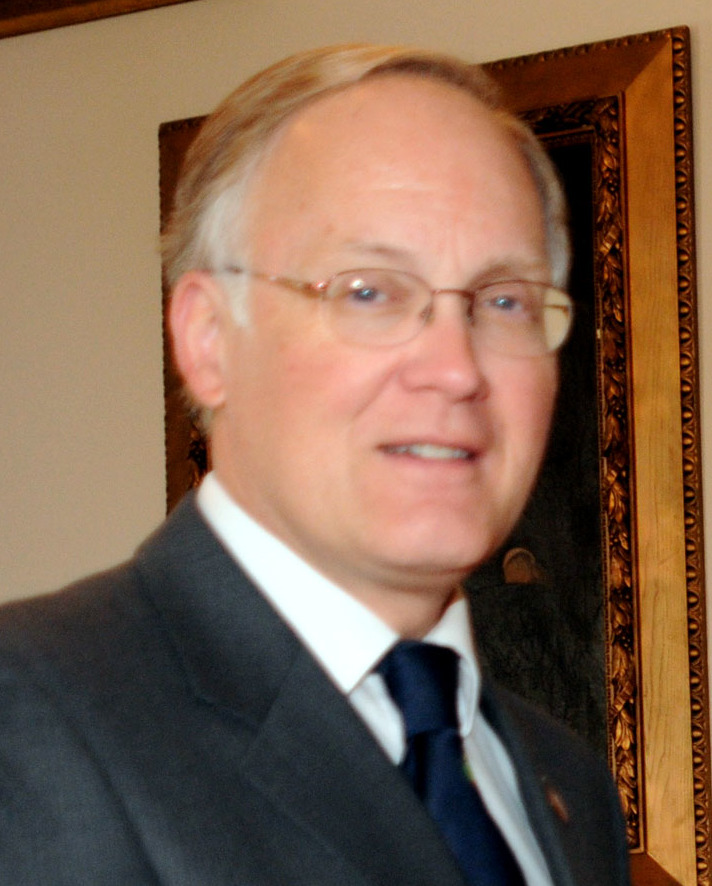

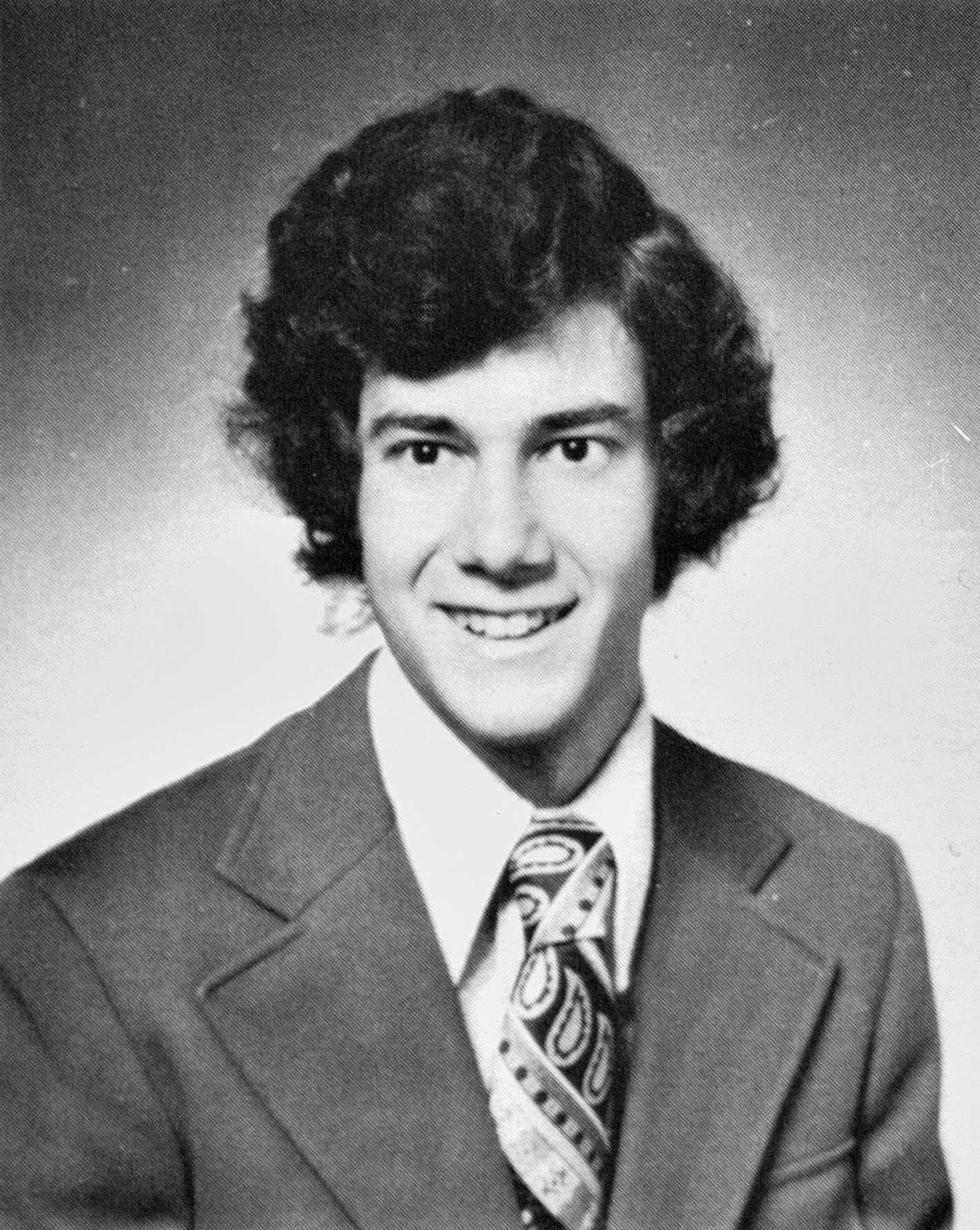

Nominee	Jim Douglas	Doug Racine	Cornelius Hogan
Party	Republican	Democratic	Independent
Popular vote	103,436	97,565	22,353
Percentage	44.94%	42.39%	9.71%
- Douglas: 30–40% 40–50% 50–60% 60–70% 70–80% 80–90% Racine: 30–40% 40–50% 50–60% 60–70% 70–80%
Governor before election
Howard Dean
Democratic
Elected Governor
Jim Douglas
Republican

The 2002 Vermont gubernatorial election took place on November 5, 2002. Incumbent Democratic Governor Howard Dean did not run for re-election to a sixth full term as governor of Vermont. Republican Jim Douglas defeated Democratic candidate Doug Racine and independent candidate Cornelius "Con" Hogan, among others, to succeed him. Since no candidate received a majority in the popular vote, Douglas was elected by the Vermont General Assembly, as required by the state constitution.

The race was very close, with Douglas prevailing by just under 6,000 votes or 2.56%. In Vermont, if no candidate for governor, lieutenant governor, or treasurer receives 50% of the popular vote, then the Vermont General Assembly picks the winner. In practice, the general assembly almost always chooses the candidate who obtained a plurality. Racine conceded to Douglas, who was selected by the general assembly. Douglas's strong performance in Montpelier and Rutland carried him to victory. Racine did well in populous Burlington and greater Chittenden County, but it was not enough to overcome Douglas's advantage. Douglas was reelected three more times. Racine ran for governor again in 2010, but narrowly lost the Democratic primary to Peter Shumlin. Shumlin won the general election and chose Racine to be his Secretary of Human Services. Racine stepped down from that post in 2014.

== Democratic primary ==
=== Results ===
Democratic primary results
Party	Candidate	Votes	%	±%
Democratic	Doug Racine	25,522	99.1	
Democratic	Other	232	0.9	
Total votes		25,754	100	

== Republican primary ==
=== Results ===
Republican primary results
Party	Candidate	Votes	%	±%
Republican	Jim Douglas	23,366	96.7	
Republican	Other	789	3.3	
Total votes		24,155	100	

== Progressive primary ==
=== Results ===
Progressive primary results
Party	Candidate	Votes	%	±%
Progressive	Michael J. Badamo	931	54.2	
Progressive	Peter Diamondstone	412	24.0	
Progressive	Other	376	21.8	
Total votes		1,719	100	

== General election ==
=== Predictions ===
Source	Ranking	As of
The Cook Political Report	Tossup	October 31, 2002
Sabato's Crystal Ball	Lean R (flip)	November 4, 2002

=== Results ===
2002 Vermont gubernatorial election
Party	Candidate	Votes	%	±%
Republican	Jim Douglas	103,436	44.94	+6.99%
Democratic	Doug Racine	97,565	42.39	−8.06%
Independent	Cornelius Hogan	22,353	9.71	N/A
Marijuana	Cris Ericson	1,737	0.75	N/A
Progressive	Michael Badamo	1,380	0.60	N/A
Libertarian	Joel Williams	938	0.41	+0.14%
Grassroots	Patricia Hejny	771	0.33	−0.13%
Restore Justice-Freedom	Marilynn Christian	638	0.28	N/A
Liberty Union	Peter Diamondstone	625	0.27	+0.16%
Independent	Brian Pearl	569	0.25	N/A
Write-in	Write-ins	149	0.06	
Total votes		230,161	100.00%	

==== Results by county ====
County	Jim Douglas Republican		Doug Racine Democratic		Con Hogan Independent		Various candidates		Margin		Total votes cast
County	#	%	#	%	#	%	#	%	#	%	Total votes cast
Addison	7,305	48.5%	6,354	42.2%	1,098	7.3%	313	2.1%	951	6.3%	15,070
Bennington	6,440	48.6%	5,125	38.7%	1,078	8.1%	595	4.5%	1,315	9.9%	13,238
Caledonia	5,501	55.5%	3,321	33.5%	853	8.6%	228	2.3%	2,180	22.0%	9,903
Chittenden	24,356	43.3%	26,249	46.4%	4,631	8.2%	1,196	2.1%	-1,713	-3.1%	56,612
Essex	1,269	62.6%	540	26.7%	126	6.2%	91	4.5%	729	35.9%	2,026
Franklin	7,383	49.5%	5,677	38.1%	1,506	10.1%	346	2.3%	1,706	11.4%	14,912
Grand Isle	1,577	49.8%	1,180	37.3%	317	10.0%	92	2.9%	397	12.5%	3,166
Lamoille	3,854	42.6%	3,508	38.8%	1,433	15.8%	254	2.8%	346	3.8%	9,049
Orange	5,035	44.7%	4,634	41.2%	1,214	10.8%	371	3.3%	401	3.5%	11,254
Orleans	4,734	51.9%	2,900	31.8%	1,237	13.6%	258	2.8%	1,834	20.1%	9,129
Rutland	11,883	52.2%	8,538	37.5%	1,572	6.9%	751	3.3%	3,345	14.7%	22,744
Washington	9,015	36.7%	10,151	41.3%	4,855	19.8%	547	2.2%	-1,136	-4.6%	24,568
Windham	6,054	35.9%	8,884	52.7%	885	5.3%	1,028	6.1%	-2,830	-16.8%	16,851
Windsor	8,850	40.9%	10,504	48.5%	1,548	7.2%	737	3.4%	-1,654	-7.6%	21,639
Totals	103,436	44.9%	97,565	42.4%	22,353	9.7%	6,807	3.0%	5,871	2.5%	230,161

Counties that flipped from Democratic to Republican

- Addison (largest municipality: Middlebury)
- Bennington (largest municipality: Bennington)
- Grand Isle (largest municipality: Alburgh)
- Lamoille (largest municipality: Morristown)
- Orange (largest city: Randolph)
- Rutland (largest municipality: Rutland)

== See also ==
- 2002 United States House of Representatives election in Vermont
