= Kingite =

Kingite may refer to:

- Kingite, a supporter of the Māori King movement
- Kingite, a phosphate mineral
- Kingite group, a division of American Quakerism precipitated by Joseph Hoag
- Kingite (adj.), of King Country, North Island, New Zealand
