= Michael J. Obuchowski =

American politician

Vermont Commissioner of Buildings and General Services
- In office January 7, 2011 – January 4, 2017
- Preceded by: Gerry Myers
- Succeeded by: Christopher Cole

Speaker of the Vermont House of Representatives
- In office January 4, 1995 – January 2, 2001
- Preceded by: Ralph G. Wright
- Succeeded by: Walter E. Freed

Member of the Vermont House of Representatives
- In office January 3, 1973 – January 6, 2011
- Preceded by: Maurice Stack Sr., Thomas P. Salmon (District 13-1)
- Succeeded by: Matt Trieber (Windham-4)

Personal details
- Born: February 4, 1952 (age 74) Bellows Falls, Vermont, U.S.
- Party: Democratic
- Spouse: Clare Buckley (m. 2010)
- Children: 2
- Education: Harvard University (attended)
- Occupation: Government official

Michael J. Obuchowski (born February 4, 1952) is a former member of the Vermont House of Representatives. Elected at age 20 in 1972, he won reelection 19 times, serving continuously from January, 1973 until resigning in January, 2011 to accept appointment as Vermont's Buildings and General Services Commissioner. Obuchowski served as Speaker from 1995 to 2001.

== Biography ==
Michael John ("Obie") Obuchowski was born in Bellows Falls, Vermont on February 4, 1952. He graduated from Bellows Falls High School in 1970 and attended Harvard University for two years.

A Democrat, in 1972 Obuchowski was elected to the Vermont House of Representatives. He also began a full-time career as Assistant to the President of Basketville, a Putney business specializing in handmade baskets and other woven products for national and international retailers.

Obuchowski was elected every two years through 2010, and held office until resigning in January, 2011 to join the administration of Peter Shumlin as Commissioner of the Department of Buildings and General Services. At 38 years, his tenure was the longest in the history of the Vermont House until he was surpassed by Alice Emmons in 2021.

During Obuchowski's career he served as Chairman of the House Committees on Education, Energy, Commerce, Ways and Means, and Appropriations. In addition, he served as Chairman of the Vermont General Assembly's Joint Energy, Transportation Oversight, Telecommunications Study, and Fiscal Committees.

In 1995 Obuchowski was named Speaker of the House, succeeding Ralph G. Wright, who had been defeated for reelection to his House seat. He served until 2001, when Republicans gained enough seats to become the majority party in the House.

After Peter Shumlin won the race for Governor in 2010, he named Vermont State Treasurer Jeb Spaulding as Secretary of Administration. Obuchowski was considered for appointment to the vacant Treasurer's position, and ultimately accepted appointment as Buildings and General Services Commissioner. In December 2016, Governor-elect Phil Scott announced that Christopher Cole, who had previously served as Vermont's transportation secretary, was his choice to succeed Obuchowski. Obuchowski was subsequently employed by the state agency of transportation and he retired in 2026.

== Personal ==
Obuchowski is married to attorney and lobbyist Clare Buckley, and they are the parents of twins Jack and Nora.

Political offices
| Preceded by Ralph G. Wright | Speaker of the Vermont House of Representatives; 1995 – 2001 | Succeeded by Walter E. Freed |
