= Patricia McCoy =

American politician (born 1955)

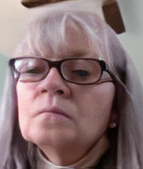

Minority Leader of the Vermont House of Representatives
- Incumbent
- Assumed office January 9, 2019
- Preceded by: Donald H. Turner

Member of the Vermont House of Representatives from the Rutland district
- Incumbent
- Assumed office January 7, 2015
- Preceded by: Andy Donaghy

Personal details
- Born: January 26, 1955 (age 71) Bridgeport, Connecticut, U.S.
- Party: Republican
- Spouse: Matthew McCoy
- Children: 3
- Education: University of Connecticut (BS)

Patricia A. McCoy (born January 26, 1955) is an American politician who serves as the Minority Leader in the Vermont House of Representatives and from the Rutland district as a member of the Republican Party. She has served as the town clerk and treasurer in Poultney, Vermont since 1991.

== Early life and education ==
Patricia A. McCoy was born in Bridgeport, Connecticut, on January 26, 1955. She graduated from Stratford High School, and the University of Connecticut with a Bachelor of Science degree in environmental resource management. She married Matthew McCoy, with whom she had three children, and has lived in Poultney, Vermont since 1979.

== Career ==
=== Local politics ===
McCoy initially supported the Democratic Party after moving to Vermont. She was first elected to serve as Poultney's town clerk and treasurer in 1991, to succeed Josephine Williams, who had retired after having served since 1982. McCoy became the treasurer for the Poultney school district following the resignation of the business manager of the Rutland Southwest Supervisory Union and served in that role until she appointed Steve Parker as assistant school treasurer. She was selected to serve as the treasurer of the Vermont Municipal Clerks and Treasurers Association in 2000, and the organization gave her the Clerk of the Year Award alongside Gary Snider.

=== Vermont House of Representatives ===
Andy Donaghy, a Republican member of the Vermont House of Representatives, retired during the 2014 election. She won the Republican nomination without opposition and faced no opposition in the 2014, 2016, and 2018 elections. She defeated independent candidate Tyler-Joseph Ballard in the 2020 election.

During her tenure in the state house she has served on the Human Services, Commerce and Economic Development, Transportation, Rules, Legislative Council committees. She was selected to serve as assistant minority leader alongside Representative Brian K. Savage in 2016, and was selected to replace Donald H. Turner as Minority Leader when he ran for lieutenant governor in 2018.

== Political opinions ==
In the 2024 United States presidential election, she was a Republican who opposed the Donald Trump 2024 presidential campaign. McCoy endorsed the Nikki Haley campaign.

== Electoral history ==
2014 Vermont House of Representatives Rutland district election
Primary election
Party	Candidate	Votes	%
Republican	Patricia McCoy	67	100.00%
Total votes		67	100.00%
	Blank and spoiled	8	
General election
Republican	Patricia McCoy	849	97.92%
Write-in		18	2.08%
Total votes		867	100.00%
	Blank and spoiled	181	

2016 Vermont House of Representatives Rutland district election
Primary election
Party	Candidate	Votes	%
Republican	Patricia McCoy (incumbent)	192	100.00%
Total votes		192	100.00%
	Blank and spoiled	27	
General election
Republican	Patricia McCoy (incumbent)	1,425	98.55%
Write-in		21	1.45%
Total votes		1,446	100.00%
	Blank and spoiled	259	

2018 Vermont House of Representatives Rutland district election
Primary election
Party	Candidate	Votes	%
Republican	Patricia McCoy (incumbent)	284	99.65%
Write-in		1	0.35%
Total votes		285	100.00%
	Blank and spoiled	55	
General election
Republican	Patricia McCoy (incumbent)	1,138	96.52%
Write-in		41	3.48%
Total votes		1,179	100.00%
	Blank and spoiled	248	

2020 Vermont House of Representatives Rutland district election
Primary election
Party	Candidate	Votes	%
Republican	Patricia McCoy (incumbent)	399	97.79%
Write-in		9	2.21%
Total votes		408	100.00%
	Blank and spoiled	59	
General election
Republican	Patricia McCoy (incumbent)	1,283	71.12%
Independent	Tyler-Joseph Ballard	513	28.44%
Write-in		8	0.44%
Total votes		1,804	100.00%
	Blank and spoiled	134	

2022 Vermont House of Representatives Rutland-1 district election
Primary election
Party	Candidate	Votes	%
Republican	Patricia McCoy (incumbent)	281	100.00%
Total votes		281	100.00%
	Blank and spoiled	23	
General election
Republican	Patricia McCoy (incumbent)	1,493	97.65%
Write-in		36	2.35%
Total votes		1,529	100.00%
	Blank and spoiled	340	

2024 Vermont House of Representatives Rutland-1 district election
Primary election
Party	Candidate	Votes	%
Republican	Patricia McCoy (incumbent)	187	98.42%
Write-in		3	1.58%
Total votes		190	100.00%
	Blank and spoiled	13	
General election
Republican	Patricia McCoy (incumbent)	1,955	97.46%
Write-in		51	2.54%
Total votes		2,006	100.00%
	Blank and spoiled	403	

Vermont House of Representatives
Preceded by Don Turner	Minority Leader of the Vermont House of Representatives; 2019–present	Incumbent
