= National Rural Economic Development Institute =

Training and consulting institute

The National Rural Economic Development Institute (NREDI) helps develop the capacity of the National Rural Development Partnership and its constituent organizations (State Rural Development Councils and the National Rural Development Council) by providing economic development-related training and consulting services.
