= Donald H. Turner =

American politician in Vermont (1964–2024)

Don Turner
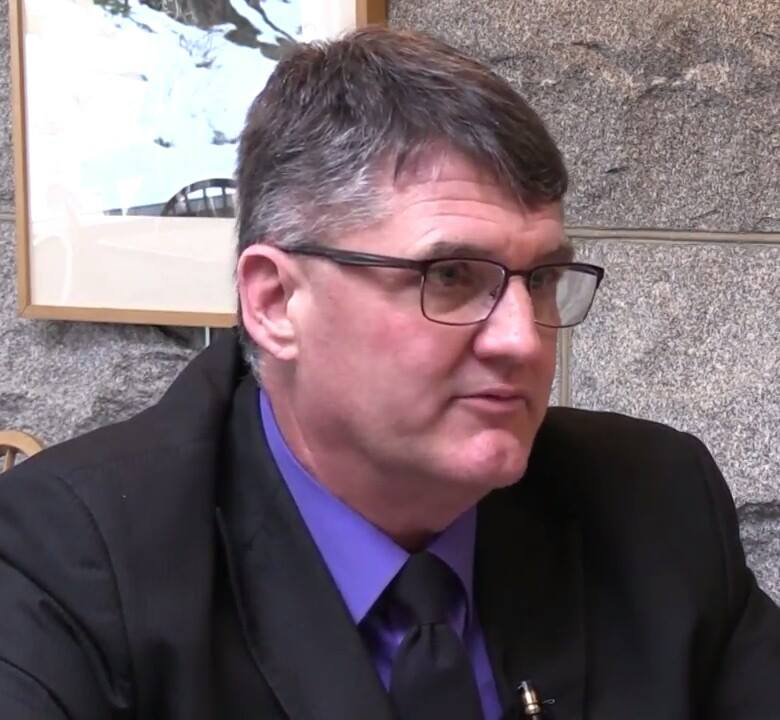

Minority Leader of the Vermont House of Representatives
- In office January 5, 2011 – January 9, 2019
- Preceded by: Patti Komline
- Succeeded by: Patricia McCoy

Member of the Vermont House of Representatives from the Chittenden 10th district
- In office January 23, 2007 – January 9, 2019

Personal details
- Born: July 19, 1964 Burlington, Vermont, U.S.
- Died: November 30, 2024 (aged 60) Colchester, Vermont, U.S.
- Party: Republican
- Spouse: Gail Turner
- Education: Champlain College (AS)

Donald H. Turner Jr. (July 19, 1964 – November 30, 2024) was an American Republican politician who served in the Vermont House of Representatives, to which he was first elected in 2006. He represented the Chittenden-9 district until 2012 and represented the Chittenden-10 district from 2013 to 2019 for the town of Milton in Chittenden County. He also served as the Minority Leader of the Vermont House of Representatives from 2011 to 2019. Turner later served as the Town Manager of Milton as well as a member of the Board of Civil Authority. He was also a certified fire instructor, a member of the International Association of Fire Chiefs, Milton Firefighters Association, and was the Milton Fire and Rescue Chief and Forest Fire Warden.

Turner was the 2018 Republican nominee for Lieutenant Governor of Vermont. He ran on a platform of affordability and economic growth; balance and collaboration; and supporting first responders and service-members. Turner lost to incumbent Dave Zuckerman (P/D) in the November general election.

== Legislative service ==
Turner was first elected to the Legislature in 2006. During his time in the Vermont House Representatives, Turner served on several committees, including the House Committee on Commerce and Economic Development; the House Committee on Education; the House Committee on Agriculture and Forest Products; the House Committee on Corrections and Institutions; the House Rules Committee; the Joint Rules Committee; and the Legislative Council Committee.

Much of the legislation introduced by Turner focused on property tax relief, affordability, economic growth, housing development, government modernization, budgetary management, public safety, and permitting reform. This includes legislation to improve the operations of state government, reduce property tax bills, eliminate taxes on Social Security income and military retirement income, and address unfunded pension liabilities. While serving as Minority Leader, Turner also worked with Democratic Representatives to advance legislation on issues like sexual harassment prevention.

== Death ==
Turner died at a hospice home in Colchester, Vermont, on November 30, 2024, following a diagnosis of glioblastoma. He was 60.

== Electoral history ==
2018 Vermont Lieutenant Governor General Election

Party	Candidate	Votes	%	Winner
Progressive/Democrat	David Zuckerman	158,530	58.4	✓
Republican	Don Turner	108,417	40.0	
Liberty Union	Murray Ngoima	4,108	1.5	

2016 Chittenden-10 State Representative General Election

Party	Candidate	Votes	%	Winner
Republican	Don Turner	3,387	54.3	✓
Republican	Ron Hubert	2,765	44.3	✓

2014 Chittenden-10 State Representative General Election

Party	Candidate	Votes	%	Winner
Republican	Don Turner	2,012	53.8	✓
Republican	Ron Hubert	1,691	45.2	✓

2012 Chittenden-10 State Representative General Election

Party	Candidate	Votes	%	Winner
Republican	Don Turner	3,144	48.8	✓
Republican	Ron Hubert	2,150	33.4	✓
Democrat	Todd Buik	1,144	17.8	

2010 Chittenden-9 State Representative General Election

Party	Candidate	Votes	%	Winner
Republican	Don Turner	2,282	38.6	✓
Republican	Ron Hubert	1,754	29.7	✓
Democrat	Reginald Godin	1,254	21.2	
Democrat	Todd Buik	617	10.4	

2008 Chittenden-9 State Representative General Election

Party	Candidate	Votes	%	Winner
Republican	Don Turner	2,843	38.1	✓
Republican	Ron Hubert	1,878	25.2	✓
Democrat	Reginald Godin	1,806	24.2	
Democrat	Todd Buik	918	12.3	

2006 Chittenden-9 State Representative General Election

Party	Candidate	Votes	%	Winner
Republican/Democrat	Don Turner	2,398	44.1	✓
Democrat	Reginald Godin	1,556	28.6	✓
Republican	Daniel Fitzgerald	1,476	27.1	

Party political offices
Preceded by Randy Brock	Republican nominee for Lieutenant Governor of Vermont; 2018	Succeeded by Scott Milne
Vermont House of Representatives
Preceded by Patti Komline	Minority Leader of the Vermont House of Representatives; 2011–2019	Succeeded by Pattie McCoy
