= Ralph G. Wright =

American politician (1935–2026)

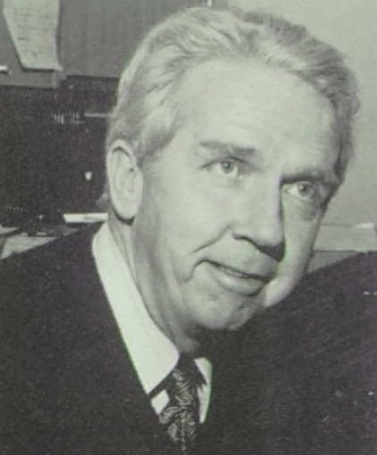
- Wright in 1989

Speaker of the Vermont House of Representatives
- In office 1985–1995
- Preceded by: Stephan A. Morse
- Succeeded by: Michael J. Obuchowski

Minority Leader of the Vermont House of Representatives
- In office 1983–1985
- Preceded by: Judy Stephany
- Succeeded by: Paul N. Poirier

Member of the Vermont House of Representatives
- In office 1979–1995 Serving with Lawrence F. Powers (1979–1981), Marie P. Condon (1981–1987), Richard Pembroke (1987–1995)
- Preceded by: Joseph J. Caracciola
- Succeeded by: Gerald P. Morrissey
- Constituency: Bennington 4-1

Personal details
- Born: June 10, 1935 (age 91) Arlington, Massachusetts, US
- Died: June 17, 2026 (aged 91) Lady Lake, Florida, US
- Party: Democratic
- Spouse: Catherine Farese (m. 1957–2020)
- Children: 4
- Education: Boston University; Framingham State University
- Profession: Public school teacher and administrator

Military service
- Service: United States Marine Corps
- Years of service: 1953–1955
- Rank: Private First Class
- Unit: 1st Marine Aircraft Wing
- Wars: Korean War

Ralph G. Wright (June 10, 1935 – June 17, 2026) was an American teacher and politician who served as Speaker of the Vermont House of Representatives.

== Early life and education ==
Ralph George Wright was born in Arlington, Massachusetts on June 10, 1935, a son of Ralph H. Wright and Mary E. Wright. He was raised in Lexington and Somerville and left Somerville High School in 1953 to join the United States Marine Corps. (Note: After completing his bachelor's and master's degrees, Wright received his GED.) Trained as a motor transport operator, he served as a military police officer with the 1st Marine Aircraft Wing during the Korean War and left the marines as a private first class in 1955.

After his military service, Wright worked for the Raytheon Corporation in Newton, Massachusetts while attending Boston University, and he graduated in 1961 with a Bachelor of Arts degree. In 1963, he received a Master of Education degree from Framingham State Teachers College (now Framingham State University).

== Career ==
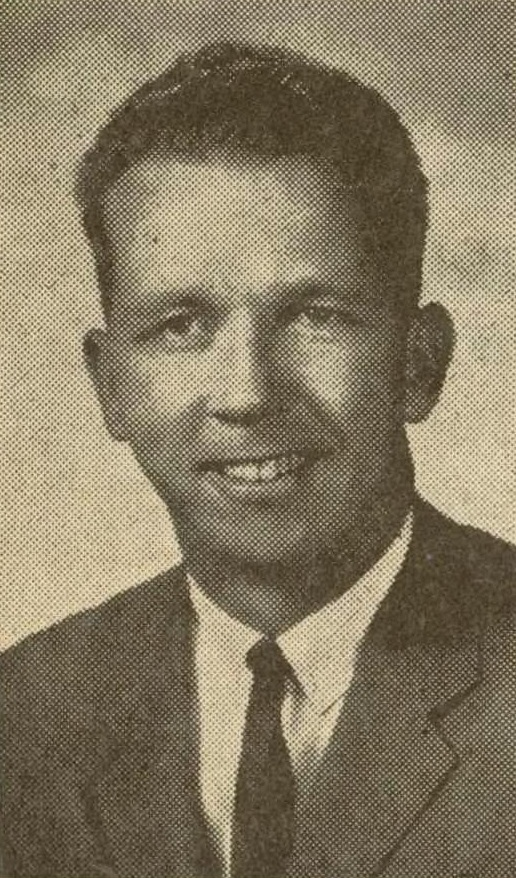
Wright in 1967

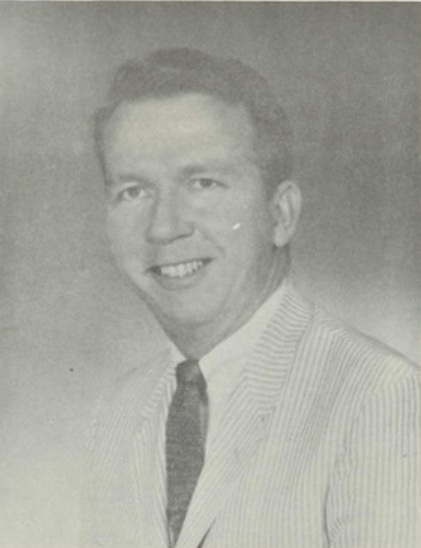
Wright in 1968

After college, Wright taught and coached at Ashland High School, where he remained for three years. In 1965, he accepted a position as principal of the high school in Newbury, Vermont. In 1966, he became assistant headmaster at St. Johnsbury Academy. In 1967, he was appointed as an assistant professor at Lyndon State College. Wright moved to Bennington, Vermont, in 1968 and was a teacher and director of an alternative education program for troubled teens.

A Democrat, Wright served in local offices in Bennington during the 1960s and 1970s, including selectman. In 1978 he won election to the Vermont House of Representatives, where he served from 1979 to 1995. From 1983 to 1985 Wright was the House Minority Leader.

In 1985 Wright was elected Speaker of the House, a victory remarkable for the fact that Republicans were in the majority.

Serving as Speaker for 10 years, Wright's candidate recruiting and campaign support work, carried out in conjunction with other Democrats including Representative Paul N. Poirier, who became the House majority leader, saw Democrats become the majority party in the House during Wright's final term.

Wright was defeated for reelection to the House in the Republican sweep of 1994.

At 10 years, Ralph Wright's term remains the longest of any Vermont Speaker of the House.

== Later life and death ==
After leaving the Vermont House, Wright worked briefly as a lobbyist before accepting a position as Special Assistant to the United States Secretary of Education, based in the Boston, Massachusetts regional office.

Wright also authored a memoir, 1996's All Politics Is Personal.

In 2000 Wright retired and relocated to Florida. He authored another book, 2005's Inside the Statehouse: Lessons From the Speaker and was an adjunct professor at Lake-Sumter State College. Wright died in Lady Lake, Florida on June 17, 2026, at the age of 91.

== Notes ==
Political offices
Preceded by Stephan A. Morse	Speaker of the Vermont House of Representatives; 1985 –1995	Succeeded by Michael J. Obuchowski
