= Front Porch Forum =

Social benefit corporation in Vermont, US

- Type: Private
- Industry: Social networking service
- Founded: 2000
- Founders: Michael and Valerie Wood-Lewis
- Area served: Vermont; Williamstown, Massachusetts; Glens Falls and Lake George region, New York
- Number of employees: 30
- Website: frontporchforum.com

Front Porch Forum (FPF) is a social network founded in 2000 and incorporated in 2006 based in Burlington, Vermont. It is a Vermont public benefit corporation.

== Overview ==
Front Porch Forum's stated purpose is to strengthen Vermont communities, reflected in its deliberate choice not to expand across the United States. The service contains over 250 separate forums which correspond to a town, combination of towns, or district of a city. Its core focus is on Vermont, though it also serves parts of New York and a single town in Massachusetts. As of 2025 the site had nearly 250,000 members and a staff of around thirty, including 12 moderators and three full-stack developers. FPF also maintains a community directory of local businesses and a community calendar of member-submitted events.

== History ==
Front Porch Forum originated as a Burlington-centric local email list called the Five Sisters Neighborhood Forum. Michael and Valerie Wood-Lewis were new to the area, parenting a son with cerebral palsy, and wanted to meet more of their neighbors. They began by distributing flyers in their local area encouraging people to join and received a positive response. Michael Wood-Lewis hired engineer Rob Maurizi to design a proof-of-concept platform and relaunched the list using its own custom-built software. FPF then launched free coverage for all of Chittenden County, Vermont. Over the next few years, a number of towns or regions paid would pay a small one-time set-up fee to have an FPF instance created for their town.

Following the aftermath of Tropical Storm Irene, which left over 60 houses flooded and nearly $700 million of damage, residents of Moretown, Vermont used FPF to organize aid, cleanup efforts, and updates on developments of the cleanup. In 2011 an initiative from the Vermont Council on Rural Development (VCRD) received a federal grant to expand internet access to rural parts of the state, and they offered FPF as part of a package to towns that applied for assistance. After Hurricane Irene VCRD received a second grant to "increase the resiliency of at-risk towns" which allowed FPF to increase their coverage to the entire state of Vermont. The site is free for users.

== Features and functionality ==
Upon registration, users are required to give their street address, or official job title for participating public officials, in order to create an account. This is designed to keep conversations accountable and locally focused, as well as to contain the spread of misinformation.

Users interact with the service either through a website, mobile application, or via email. Posts to the site are reviewed and aggregated by Vermont-based human moderators, and distributed as community-specific email digests. Front Porch Forum's platform incorporates a number of design features that are intended to promote neighbor connection and trust. These include: no anonymity, no commenting on posts, a deliberately slow pace of publication, no endless scrolling and no opportunities for virality. The site has no algorithm; everyone using the service sees the same content in their geographic area. Michael Wood-Lewis explains that the site does not want to hold you captive "we really just want you for five or 10 minutes a day."

== Business model ==
The company's primary source of revenue is advertisements from local businesses. Ads are targeted by geographical region. Other sources of revenue are featured community directory listings from local companies and a twice-yearly fundraiser.

With the onset of the Covid-19 pandemic in 2020, Front Porch Forum saw a significant increase in users, posts, and other forms of activity. Members used FPF to coordinate mutual aid efforts, organize support for local businesses, and share information about public health issues.

== Impact ==
In a 2023 survey of FPF members conducted by the Center for Media Engagement at the University of Texas-Austin, 80% of respondents indicated that people treat each other with respect on FPF, and 78% see FPF as a reliable source of information. FPF had higher ratings than similar, larger services such as Facebook and Nextdoor, on indicators such as "connecting users with where they live", "treating people humanely" and "helping users feel more informed."

In 2025, FPF was recognized as "an integral part of civic life for many Vermonters" in the Vermont Civic Health Index and cited as part of an "architecture of hope" for more pro-social online communities in a speech by Eli Parisier of New_ Public.
