= Stephan A. Morse =

American politician

Stephan A. Morse (born April 1, 1947) is a Vermont politician who served four terms in the Vermont House of Representatives, including two terms as Speaker.

== Biography ==
Stephan Morse was born in Springfield, Vermont, on April 1, 1947, and was raised and educated in Newfane. Morse graduated from the University of Vermont in 1969 and worked as a painting contractor until 1984, when he became executive director of the Windham Foundation, a philanthropic agency in Grafton that was formed to aid in the restoration and historic preservation of rural and village areas of Vermont.

A Republican, Morse served as Newfane's zoning administrator from 1971 to 1974. He was a member of the town's board of selectmen from 1974 to 1977, and was chairman from 1975 to 1977. Morse also served as chairman of the Windham County Republican Committee and a member of the Vermont State Republican Committee.

In 1976 Morse was elected to the Vermont House of Representatives, and he served four terms. He was assistant majority leader from 1979 to 1980 and majority leader in 1980.

From 1981 to 1985 Morse served as Speaker of the House. He declined to run for reelection to the House in 1984.

After leaving the House Morse continued his work at the Windham Foundation until retiring in 2007. He was also active in several business ventures, including owning and operating an inn in Grafton and serving as president of the Grafton Village Cheese Company.

Political offices
Preceded by Timothy J. O'Connor Jr.	Speaker of the Vermont House of Representatives; 1981 – 1985	Succeeded by Ralph G. Wright
