= Neale F. Lunderville =

Vermont Secretary of Administration
- In office August 2008 – January 6, 2011
- Governor: Jim Douglas
- Preceded by: Mike Smith
- Succeeded by: Jeb Spaulding

Vermont Secretary of Transportation
- In office August 7, 2006 – August 2008
- Governor: Jim Douglas
- Preceded by: Dawn Terrill
- Succeeded by: David Dill

Personal details
- Born: Neale Francis Lunderville Burlington, Vermont, U.S.
- Party: Republican
- Education: American University (BA)

Neale Francis Lunderville is a government official from the state of Vermont.

He served as the Secretary of the Agency of Administration under Governor Jim Douglas. Before being appointed Administration Secretary in 2008, he served as the Secretary of the Vermont Agency of Transportation from 2006 to 2008, and as the Secretary of Civil & Military Affairs under Governor Douglas. Neale served as the recovery officer for Vermont after Hurricane Irene in 2011.

In May of 2026, it was announced that Vermont Governor Phil Scott had appointed Neale as chair of the new Vermont Artificial Intelligence Economic Task Force, an initiative to promote economic acceleration, small business competitiveness, and community resilience through safe and innovative uses of AI technologies.

== Personal ==
Lunderville was born in Burlington, Vermont. He graduated from American University in Washington, D.C., with a degree in Political Science.
