= 2006 Vermont gubernatorial election =

- November 7, 2006
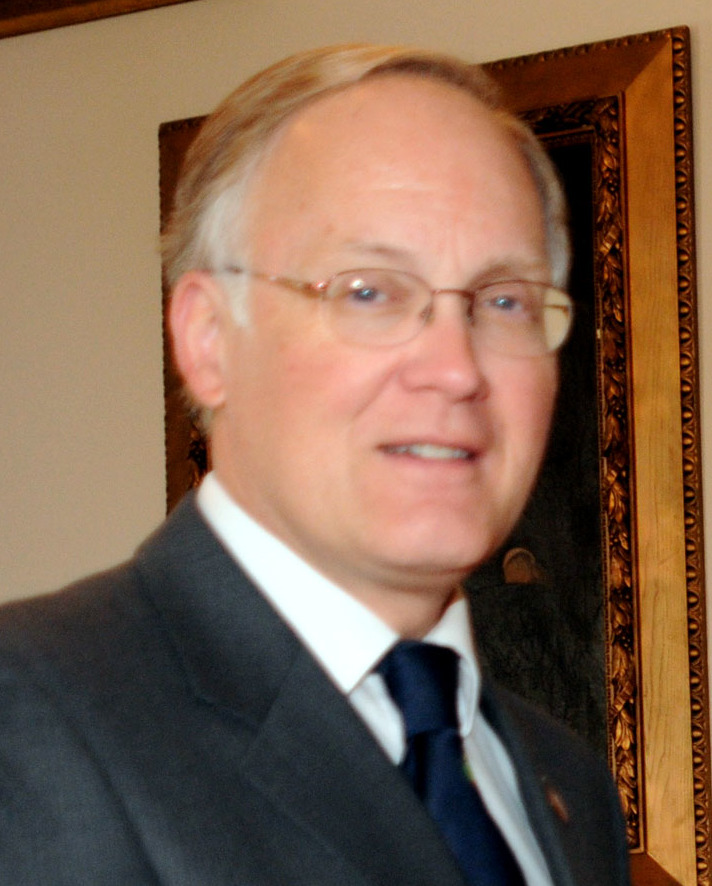

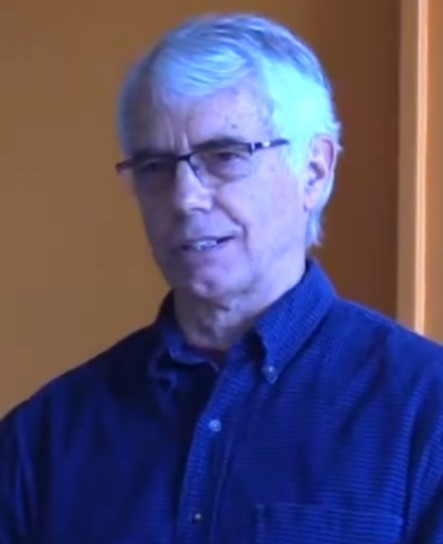
Nominee	Jim Douglas	Scudder Parker
Party	Republican	Democratic
Popular vote	148,014	108,090
Percentage	56.36%	41.16%
- Douglas: 40–50% 50–60% 60–70% 70–80% 80–90% Parker: 40–50% 50–60% 60–70% 70–80%
Governor before election
Jim Douglas
Republican
Elected Governor
Jim Douglas
Republican

The 2006 Vermont gubernatorial election took place on November 7. Incumbent Republican Governor Jim Douglas won re-election to a third term, defeating Democratic nominee Scudder Parker.

== Candidates ==
=== Democratic Party ===
- Scudder Parker, former Democratic Party Chair, state senator, minister and director of energy efficiency at the Vermont Department of Public Service. Began campaigning in late 2005 and subsequently won the Democratic nomination when no other Democrat filed by the July 16, 2006 deadline. His fundraising efforts resulted in $110,000 in donations in the month of July 2006.

=== Republican Party ===
- Jim Douglas, incumbent Governor of Vermont

=== Liberty Union Party ===
- Robert Skold, website publisher

=== Vermont Green Party ===
- Jim Hogue

=== United States Marijuana Party ===
- Cris Ericson

=== Independents ===
- Benjamin Clarke

== General Election ==
=== Predictions ===
Source	Ranking	As of
The Cook Political Report	Likely R	November 6, 2006
Sabato's Crystal Ball	Safe R	November 6, 2006
Rothenberg Political Report	Safe R	November 2, 2006
Real Clear Politics	Safe R	November 6, 2006

=== Polling ===
Source	Date	Jim Douglas (R)	Scudder Parker (D)
Research 2000	September 23, 2006	53%	38%
American Research Group	September 14, 2006	59%	32%
Rasmussen	August 8, 2006	55%	37%
American Research Group	July 27, 2006	47%	36%
Rasmussen	June 16, 2006	54%	31%
Research 2000	May 11, 2006	53%	18%
Rasmussen	January 10, 2005	54%	31%

=== Results ===

2006 Vermont gubernatorial election
Party	Candidate	Votes	%	±%
Republican	Jim Douglas (incumbent)	148,014	56.36	−2.34%
Democratic	Scudder Parker	108,090	41.16	+3.23%
Independent	Cris Ericson	2,477	0.94	−0.42%
Green	Jim Hogue	1,936	0.74	N/A
Independent	Benjamin Clarke	1,216	0.46	N/A
Liberty Union	Robert Skold	638	0.24	−0.18%
Write-ins		153	0.06	−0.01%
Majority		39,924	15.2%	
Turnout		262,524	100.0	
Republican hold		Swing		

==== Results by county ====
County	Jim Douglas Republican		Scudder Parker Democratic		Various candidates		Margin		Total
County	#	%	#	%	#	%	#	%	Total
Addison	9,336	57.1%	6,780	41.5%	233	1.4%	2,556	15.6%	16,349
Bennington	7,492	51.9%	6,434	44.5%	517	3.5%	1,058	7.4%	14,443
Caledonia	7,611	62.4%	4,276	35.1%	301	2.7%	3,335	27.3%	12,188
Chittenden	37,097	56.0%	27,982	42.3%	1,147	1.8%	9,115	13.7%	66,226
Essex	1,696	66.7%	729	28.7%	117	4.5%	967	38.0%	2,542
Franklin	12,056	68.7%	5,145	29.3%	353	2.0%	6,911	39.4%	17,554
Grand Isle	2,350	64.1%	1,229	33.5%	88	2.4%	1,121	30.6%	3,667
Lamoille	5,970	57.1%	4,233	40.5%	254	2.5%	1,737	16.6%	10,457
Orange	6,900	55.3%	5,262	42.2%	311	2.5%	1,638	13.1%	12,473
Orleans	6,566	63.2%	3,531	34.0%	286	2.7%	3,035	29.2%	10,383
Rutland	16,298	63.9%	8,534	33.4%	689	2.7%	7,764	30.5%	25,521
Washington	14,003	51.4%	12,688	46.5%	577	2.1%	1,315	5.9%	27,268
Windham	7,204	38.8%	10,666	57.5%	693	3.8%	-3,462	-18.7%	18,653
Windsor	13,435	54.0%	10,601	42.6%	854	3.5%	2,834	11.4%	24,890
Totals	148,014	56.4%	108,090	41.2%	6,420	2.4%	39,924	14.2%	262,524

== See also ==
- 2006 United States gubernatorial elections
- 2006 United States Senate election in Vermont
- 2006 United States House of Representatives election in Vermont
