= Michael K. Smith (Vermont official) =

American politician

Mike Smith

Vermont Secretary of Human Services
- In office October 2019 – 2022
- Governor: Phil Scott
- Preceded by: Al Gobeille
- In office February 21, 2005 – January 30, 2006
- Governor: Jim Douglas
- Preceded by: Charlie Smith
- Succeeded by: Cindy LaWare

Vermont Secretary of Administration
- In office January 30, 2006 – August 2008
- Governor: Jim Douglas
- Preceded by: Charlie Smith
- Succeeded by: Neale F. Lunderville
- In office January 9, 2003 – February 21, 2005
- Governor: Jim Douglas
- Preceded by: Sean Campbell
- Succeeded by: Charlie Smith

Member of the Vermont House of Representatives from the Windsor-1 district
- In office January 5, 1977 – January 3, 1979
- Preceded by: John Morgan
- Succeeded by: Edward Lucas

Personal details
- Born: Rutland, Vermont, U.S.
- Party: Republican
- Education: University of Vermont

Military service
- Allegiance: United States
- Branch/service: United States Navy
- Unit: SEAL Team 2

Michael K. Smith is a former Secretary of the Agency of Human Services for the state of Vermont, a position he held from October 2019 to January 2022 and previously held from January 2005 to January 2006.

He also served as Secretary of the Vermont Agency of Administration from 2006 to 2008. After leaving government service in 2008, he worked as the President of Vermont Operations for FairPoint Communications and as a radio and television commentator.

Party political offices
Preceded by Ronald W. Crisman	Republican nominee for Vermont State Treasurer; 1992	Succeeded by Jim Douglas
