= 2008 Vermont gubernatorial election =

- November 4, 2008
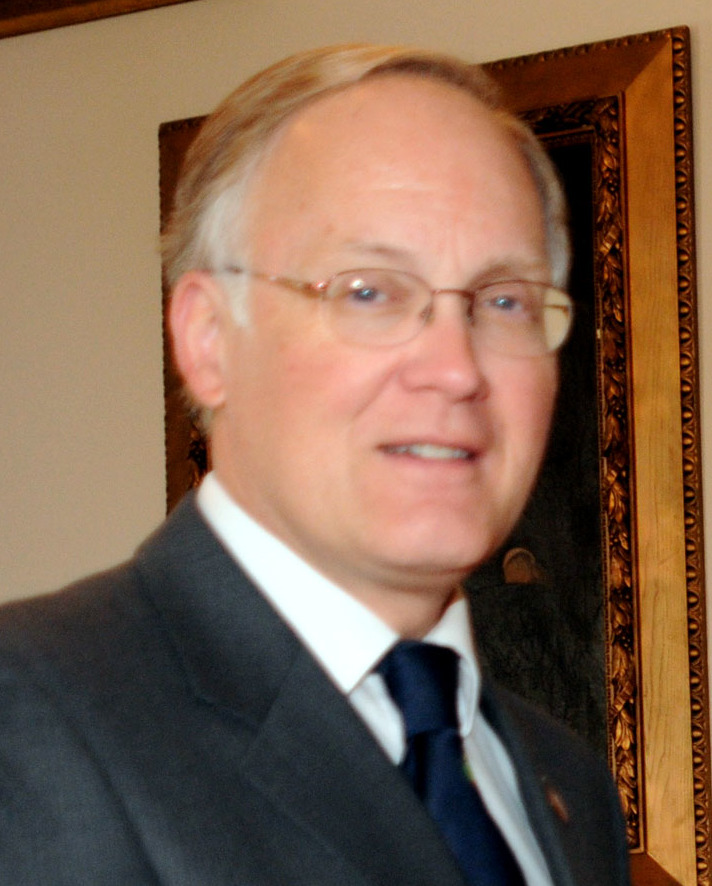

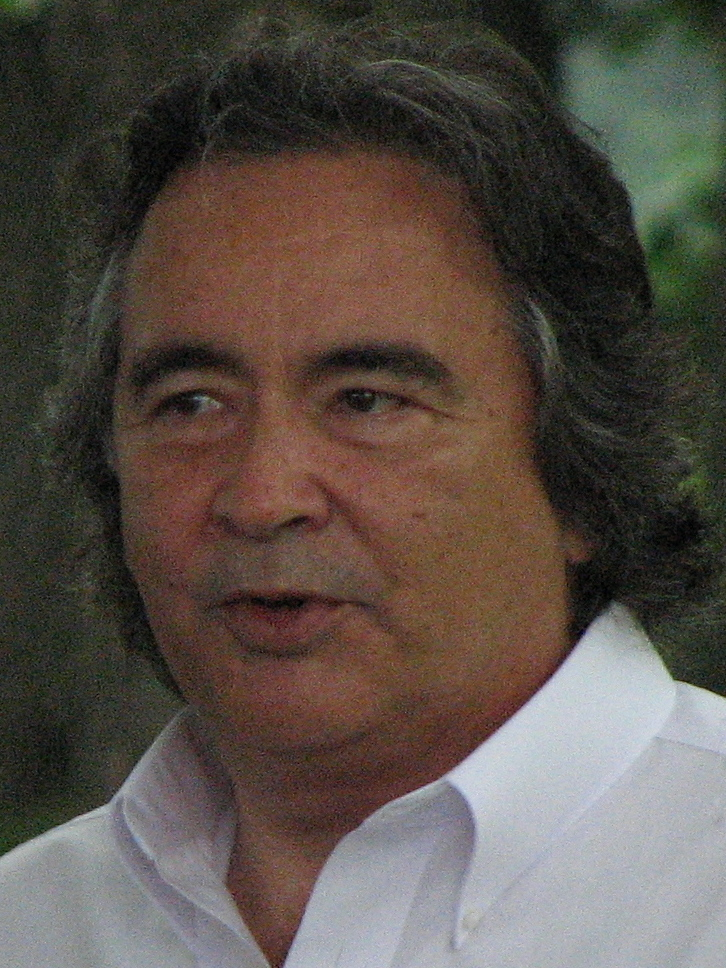

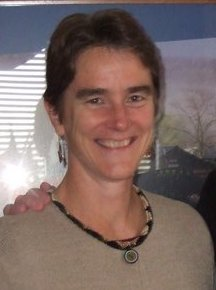
Nominee	Jim Douglas	Anthony Pollina	Gaye Symington
Party	Republican	Independent	Democratic
Popular vote	170,492	69,791	69,534
Percentage	53.43%	21.87%	21.79%
- Douglas: 30–40% 40–50% 50–60% 60–70% 70–80% Pollina: 30–40% 40–50% 50–60% Symington: 30–40% 40–50% 50–60%
Governor before election
Jim Douglas
Republican
Elected Governor
Jim Douglas
Republican

The 2008 Vermont gubernatorial election took place on November 4. Incumbent Republican Governor Jim Douglas won re-election to a fourth term. The gubernatorial primary took place on September 9, 2008.

Despite Democrat Barack Obama concurrently winning the state in a landslide in the presidential election and carrying every county, Republican Governor Jim Douglas was able to win reelection in a landslide and carried every county in the state himself. Democrats actually came in third, about 200 votes behind Independent candidate Anthony Pollina.

== General election ==
=== Dates and deadlines ===
- July 21, 2008—filing (for major parties)
- September 9, 2008—primary election
- September 12, 2008—filing (for third parties)
- October 29, 2008—voter registration deadline for general election
- November 4, 2008—general election

=== Predictions ===
Source	Ranking	As of
The Cook Political Report	Likely R	October 16, 2008
Rothenberg Political Report	Likely R	November 2, 2008
Sabato's Crystal Ball	Safe R	November 3, 2008
Real Clear Politics	Safe R	November 4, 2008

=== Polling ===
Source	Date	Jim Douglas (R)	Anthony Pollina (I/P)	Gaye Symington (D)
WCAX	October 28, 2008	47%	23%	24%
Rasmussen	October 10, 2008	45%	25%	20%

== Results ==
County Flips: Republican Hold Flip

2008 Vermont gubernatorial election
Party	Candidate	Votes	%	±%
Republican	Jim Douglas (incumbent)	170,492	53.43	−2.93%
Independent	Anthony Pollina	69,791	21.87	N/A
Democratic	Gaye Symington	69,534	21.79	−19.37%
Independent	Tony O'Connor	3,106	0.97	N/A
Independent	Sam Young	2,490	0.78	N/A
Liberty Union	Pete Diamondstone	1,710	0.54	+0.30%
Independent	Cris Ericson	1,704	0.53	−0.41%
	write-ins	258	0.08	N/A
Majority		100,701	31.56%	
Turnout		319,085		
Republican hold		Swing		

=== Results by county ===
County	Jim Douglas Republican		Anthony Pollina Independent		Gaye Symington Democratic		Various candidates		Margin		Total
County	#	%	#	%	#	%	#	%	#	%	Total
Addison	10,558	55.4%	4,442	23.3%	3,706	19.5%	340	1.8%	6,116	22.1%	19,046
Bennington	9,847	52.9%	2,143	11.5%	5,802	31.1%	836	4.5%	4,045	21.8% (Note: Compares margin over Symington.)	18,628
Caledonia	9,009	62.0%	2,917	20.1%	2,069	14.2%	540	3.7%	6,092	31.9%	14,535
Chittenden	42,163	51.7%	18,968	23.3%	18,865	23.1%	1,578	1.9%	23,195	28.4%	81,574
Essex	1,992	65.7%	405	13.4%	486	16.0%	149	4.9%	1,506	49.7%	3,032
Franklin	13,840	65.0%	3,996	18.8%	3,004	14.1%	438	2.1%	9,844	46.2%	21,278
Grand Isle	2,523	59.6%	904	21.4%	721	17.0%	82	2.0%	1,619	38.2%	4,230
Lamoille	6,722	53.9%	3,407	27.3%	2,043	16.4%	303	2.4%	3,315	26.6%	12,475
Orange	8,101	54.1%	3,464	23.1%	2,991	20.0%	416	2.8%	4,637	31.0%	14,972
Orleans	7,331	58.1%	2,705	21.4%	1,743	13.8%	845	6.7%	4,626	36.7%	12,624
Rutland	18,170	58.3%	6,212	19.9%	5,927	19.0%	854	2.7%	11,958	38.4%	31,163
Washington	15,820	49.9%	9,363	29.5%	5,798	18.3%	724	2.3%	6,457	20.4%	31,705
Windham	8,693	37.3%	4,906	21.0%	8,570	36.7%	1,160	5.0%	123	0.6%	23,329
Windsor	15,723	51.6%	5,959	19.5%	7,809	25.6%	1,003	3.3%	7,914	26.0%	30,494
Totals	170,492	53.4%	69,791	21.9%	69,534	21.8%	9,268	2.9%	100,701	31.5%	319,085

Counties that flipped from Democratic to Republican

- Windham (largest municipality: Brattleboro)

== See also ==
- 2008 United States presidential election in Vermont
