= Patti Komline =

American politician

Patti Komline (born January 23, 1961) was a Republican politician who was elected and served in the Vermont House of Representatives. She represented the Bennington-Rutland-1 Representative District. She was the House Minority Leader until 2011 when she stepped down and was succeeded by Donald Turner.

Komline supported Libertarian nominee Gary Johnson in the 2016 presidential election over fellow Republican Donald Trump. Komline left the Republican Party and identifies as a socially liberal Independent. She received a BS from Fairleigh Dickinson University in 1982.

Vermont House of Representatives
Preceded by Walter E. Freed	Member of the Vermont House of Representatives from the Bennington-Rutland 1st district 2005–2017	Succeeded by Linda Joy Sullivan
Preceded by Steven C. Adams	Minority Leader of the Vermont House of Representatives; 2009–2011	Succeeded by Donald H. Turner
