= Walter E. Freed =

American politician

88th Speaker of the Vermont House of Representatives

Member of the Vermont House of Representatives
- In office 2001–2005
- Preceded by: Michael J. Obuchowski
- Succeeded by: Gaye Symington

Member of the Vermont House of Representatives from the Bennington-Rutland 1 district
- In office 1993–2005

Personal details
- Born: August 13, 1951 (age 75) Providence, Rhode Island, U.S.
- Party: Republican
- Occupation: Businessman, Politician

Walter E. Freed (born August 13, 1951) is a Vermont politician and businessman who served two terms as Speaker of the Vermont House of Representatives.

== Biography ==
Walter E. Freed was born in Providence, Rhode Island on August 13, 1951. He graduated from Granville High School in 1970 and Dartmouth College in 1974, receiving a degree in economics.

In 1979 Freed settled in Dorset and became President of Apollo Industries, a petroleum marketer which operates gasoline stations and convenience stores in several states.

== Political career ==
A Republican, Freed served as Chairman of the Dorset School Board and as a member of the Bennington-Rutland Supervisory Union School Board. In 1988 he was elected Chairman of the Vermont Republican Party, and he was a Delegate to the Republican National Conventions of 1992, 1996 and 2000.

In 1992 Freed was elected to the Vermont House of Representatives, and he served six terms, 1993 to 2005. Freed was the Assistant Minority Leader from 1995 to 1997, and Minority Leader from 1997 to 2001. In 2001 Republicans regained the majority in the House and Freed was elected Speaker, serving until 2005.

== Later career ==
Freed did not run for reelection to the House in 2004. In 2005 he was appointed to the Vermont Liquor Control Board, and was named the board's chairman in 2007. Freed also continued his involvement in Republican politics, including service as a delegate to state and national conventions.

Vermont House of Representatives
Preceded by Perry D. Waite	Member of the Vermont House of Representatives from the Bennington-Rutland 1st district 1993–2005	Succeeded by Patti Komline
Political offices
Preceded by Michael J. Obuchowski	Speaker of the Vermont House of Representatives; 2001–2005	Succeeded by Gaye Symington
