= Gaye Symington =

American politician

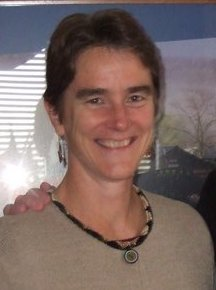

Speaker of the Vermont House of Representatives
- In office January 5, 2005 – January 8, 2009
- Preceded by: Walter Freed
- Succeeded by: Shap Smith

Member of the Vermont House of Representatives from the Chittenden's 8th district
- In office January 1997 – January 8, 2009
- Succeeded by: George Till

Personal details
- Born: April 20, 1954 (age 72) Boston, Massachusetts, U.S.
- Party: Democratic
- Spouse: Chuck Lacy
- Education: Williams College (BA); Cornell University (MBA)

Gaye R. Symington (born April 20, 1954) is an American politician who is the former Speaker of the Vermont House of Representatives, the lower house of the Vermont General Assembly. She was the 2008 Democratic nominee for the 2008 Vermont gubernatorial election against Republican Governor Jim Douglas and Independent Anthony Pollina.

Symington is married to Chuck Lacy, movie producer and former president of Ben and Jerry's ice cream. The couple have three teenage children. Symington attended Williams College as an undergraduate, and holds a master's degree in business administration from Cornell University in 1983.

== Vermont House of Representatives ==
First elected to the House in 1996 as a Democrat, Symington represented the Chittenden-8 district until 2009. As a freshman legislator, she served on the Ways and Means Committee. After the 2002 legislative elections, Symington was elected House Minority Leader in 2003 by her Democratic caucus and led the Vermont Democratic House Campaign (VDHC) in recruitment of Democratic candidates for the House of Representatives in 2004. The Democrats retook the House of Representatives in the 2004 legislative races after four years in the minority.

In January 2005, Symington was unanimously elected Speaker of the House, becoming the second woman to hold the position. In the 2006 elections, the Democratic Party increased its majority in the chamber. There were now enough Democrats, Progressives, and independents in the Vermont House to overturn a gubernatorial veto. Symington won re-election to the post in 2007 without opposition.

== 2008 Governor campaign ==
In 2008, Symington announced she would not seek re-election to the House of Representatives. In May 2008 she announced she would seek the Democratic nomination for Governor of Vermont in the 2008 election against incumbent Republican Jim Douglas and Independent Anthony Pollina. Symington finished third in the election with 69,534 votes for 21.7% of the vote. Symington's campaign was adversely affected when it was discovered she did not fully disclose her family's income. The campaign also failed to capture the endorsements of several major unions, including the state's three largest (State Employees Association, AFL-CIO, and the Vermont's National Education Association affiliate) which endorsed Pollina.

== See also ==
- List of female speakers of legislatures in the United States

Political offices
Preceded by Walter Freed	Speaker of the Vermont House of Representatives; 2005–2009	Succeeded by Shap Smith
Party political offices
Preceded by Scudder Parker	Democratic nominee for Governor of Vermont; 2008	Succeeded by Peter Shumlin
