= Florona Grange No. 540 Hall =

Historic church in Vermont, United States

- Monkton Borough Baptist Church
- U.S. National Register of Historic Places
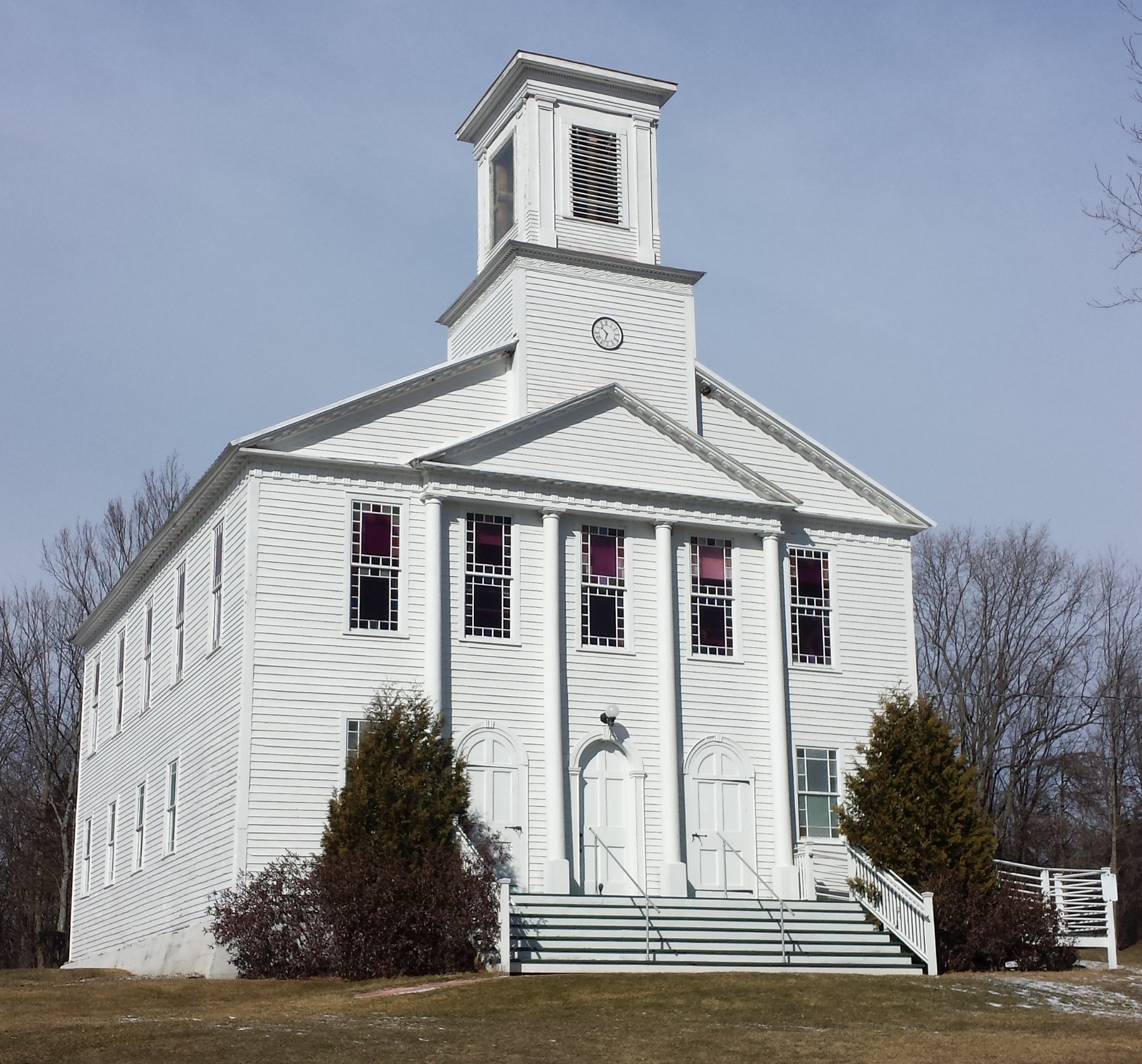

- Location within Vermont Location within the United States
- Interactive map showing the location of Monkton Borough Baptist Church
- Location: Town Hwy. 1 (Monkton Rd.), Monkton, Vermont
- Coordinates: 44°14′18.4″N 73°8′42.5″W
- Area: 1 acre (0.40 ha)
- Built: 1811
- Architectural style: Greek Revival, Federal
- NRHP reference No.: 88003121
- Added to NRHP: January 5, 1989

Florona Grange No. 540 Hall is a historic Grange hall and former church on Monkton Road in Monkton, Vermont. Built in 1811 as the Monkton Borough Baptist Church, it is the second-oldest church in Addison County. it is a fine example of Federal architecture with later Greek Revival additions. Its initial design is based closely on designs published by Asher Benjamin. The building was added to the National Register of Historic Places in 1989.

== Description and history ==
The Florona Grange Hall stands in the village of Monkton Borough, on the west side of Monkton Road north of its junction with Hollow Road. It is set back from the road on a slight rise. It is a large two-story wood-frame structure, with a gabled roof and clapboarded exterior. Its corners have narrow Federal style pilasters, rising to an entablature adorned with triglyphs. The front gable is fully pedimented, interrupted at the top by a square two-stage tower. The tower has a clock in the first stage, and a belfry in the second; the belfry stage has pilasters flanking rectangular louvered openings. A shallow gabled section projects from the center of the main facade, supported by four Doric columns. The three bays created by the columns each house an entrance, set in a rounded-arch opening with flanking pilasters and a keystone above. The interior has been significantly altered to accommodate Grange functions, but retains some of its 19th-century elements.

The hall was built in 1811 by a Baptist congregation established in 1794, and is only preceded in the county by the Middlebury Congregational Church, completed in 1809. In 1854, the present belfry was constructed, modifying the basic design of the exterior, which is based on a church depicted in Asher Benjamin's The Country Builder's Assistant, published in 1797. The Baptist congregation dissolved in 1903, and the building was acquired in 1904 by a Methodist congregation. In 1944 the Methodists combined forces with the local Quaker organization to share use of the latter's building, and this building was sold to the local Grange chapter, which had been organized in 1940. The hall continues to be used by the Grange as a community meeting and event venue.

== See also ==
- National Register of Historic Places listings in Addison County, Vermont
