= Hoag Gristmill and Knight House Complex =

Historic house in Vermont, United States

- U.S. National Register of Historic Places
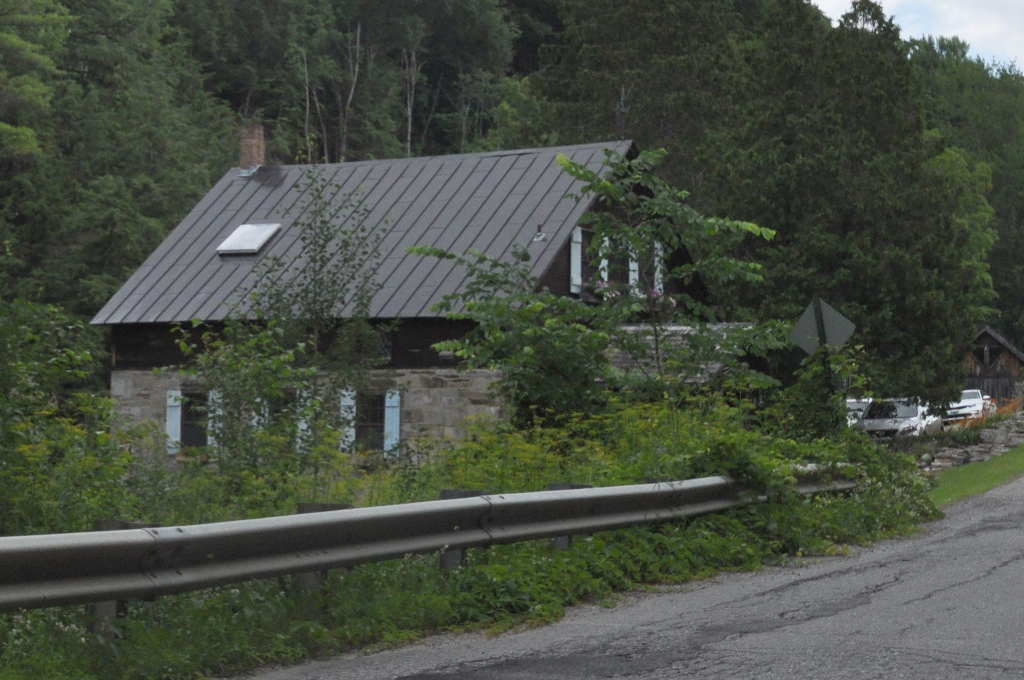
- The former Hoag Gristmill

- Location within Vermont Location within the United States
- Location: State Prison Hollow Rd., Starksboro, Vermont
- Coordinates: 44°14′37″N 73°4′8″W
- Area: 7.7 acres (3.1 ha)
- Built: 1799
- Architectural style: Greek Revival, Federal
- NRHP reference No.: 80000325
- Added to NRHP: April 22, 1980

The Hoag Gristmill and Knight House Complex is a former industrial site on State Prison Hollow Road in Starksboro, Vermont. With an industrial history dating to the 1790s, the surviving mill and c. 1820s house are an important reminder of the town's early industrial history. The complex was listed on the National Register of Historic Places in 1980. The mill was established by Joseph Hoag, a Quaker leader.

== Description and history ==
The Hoag Gristmill and Knight House stand in a gorge created by Lewis Creek in rural northwestern Starksboro. The former mill building stands close to the north side of State Prison Hollow Road, perched on a substantial two-story stone base between the road and the creek. It has a wood-frame gabled half story, the result of an 1896 reconstruction after a fire. The base is one of the surviving elements of a gristmill established in the 1790s by Joseph Hoag, a prominent Quaker leader in the region. Other elements of the mill site, including a dam and penstock, have been washed away by floods. The building is currently used as a residence.

Also on the north side of State Prison Hollow Road, but across Lewis Creek and east of the mill, stands the Knight House. Built in the 1820s, its main block is a vernacular five-bay Cape, with attached 1 1/2-story ells at its northern end. Its most distinctive feature is its entry, which features a four-panel door with a hand-forged doorhandle and semicircular transom window. The interior of the house has vernacular Greek Revival woodwork. Its earliest documented owner, Benjamin Knight, operated a carding mill that once stood nearby, and was for a time owned by the family operating the Hoag mill. Both buildings underwent a significant restoration in the mid-20th century.

== See also ==
- National Register of Historic Places listings in Addison County, Vermont
