= James F. Milne =

American politician

James F. Milne (born July 8, 1950) is a Vermont business and political figure who served for two terms as Secretary of State of Vermont.

== Biography ==
Milne was born in Barre, Vermont on July 8, 1950. He attended the local schools, and graduated from Spaulding High School in 1968. He graduated from the Massachusetts College of Pharmacy in 1974 with a bachelor of science degree in Pharamacy.

From 1974 to 1988, Milne was manager of the Allan Milne Pharmacy in Barre. From 1981 to 1992, he served on the Vermont Board of Pharmacy, and he was the board's chairman from 1986 to 1988.

Milne was president of the Vermont Jaycees from 1979 to 1980, and a vice president of the National Jaycees from 1980 to 1981.

In 1988, Milne was elected Barre City Clerk and Treasurer, and he served until 1994.

In 1992, he ran unsuccessfully for Secretary of State as a Republican, being defeated by Democrat Don Hooper. In 1994, Milne ran again and defeated Hooper. He was reelected in 1996, and served from January 1995 to January 1999.

As Secretary of State, Milne oversaw the Vermont State Archives, Vermont's elections, Business registrations and various state boards and commissions. During his tenure, the Secretary of State's operation of based out of the history Redstone building in Montpelier.

Milne failed his 1998 reelection campaign, losing to Democrat Deborah Markowitz.

== Family ==
Milne is married to Judith Garigliano Milne; they are the parents of three daughters and one son.

James Milne was a cousin of Donald Milne, the longtime Clerk of the Vermont House of Representatives, and is a cousin of Donald Milne's son Scott Milne, the Republican nominee for Governor of Vermont in 2014 and U.S. Senator from Vermont in 2016.

== Sources ==
=== Internet ===
- "Biography, James F. Milne" (PDF). Secretary of State James F. Milne Records, 1995 to 1999. Montpelier, VT: Vermont Secretary of State.
- ClarkR (March 8, 2014). "1992 Secretary of State General Election Results - Vermont". US Election Atlas. David Leip.
- ClarkR (November 19, 2013). "1994 Secretary of State General Election Results - Vermont". US Election Atlas. David Leip.
- ClarkR (September 17, 2013). "1996 Secretary of State General Election Results - Vermont". US Election Atlas. David Leip.
- ClarkR (March 9, 2014). "1998 Secretary of State General Election Results - Vermont". US Election Atlas. David Leip.
- Clerk of the Vermont House of Representatives (2011). "Secretaries of State, 1778-2011". History of Elected Officials. Vermont House of Representatives.

=== Newspapers ===
- "Spaulding High School: Peace Dialogue Highlights Graduation". Burlington Free Press. Burlington, VT. June 14, 1968. p. 32.
- Hallenbeck, Terri (October 28, 2014). "Scott Milne: A complicated candidate". Burlington, VT: Burlington Free Press.

Party political offices
Preceded by Jim Douglas	Republican nominee for Secretary of State of Vermont; 1992, 1994, 1996, 1998	Succeeded by Larry Drown
Preceded by Donald M. Hooper	Democratic nominee for Secretary of State of Vermont; 1996	Succeeded by Deborah Markowitz
Political offices
Preceded by Donald M. Hooper	Secretary of State of Vermont; 1995–1999	Succeeded by Deborah Markowitz
