= Lindley Murray Hoag =

Lindley Murray Hoag (September 29, 1808 – November 1880) was a Quaker missionary and minister. Hoag is known for purportedly having had a vision of a place by a lake in Norway. He travelled there and gathered with Friends (Quakers) at meetings. He recruited about 40 to move to the United States. He also travelled extensively in other areas of the U.S. and to Europe on missionary trips.

He was the son of Joseph Hoag and Huldah Hoag, both Quaker ministers. A memoir was written for his wife who was also named Huldah.

Hoag moved from Wolfeboro, New Hampshire, to Iowa. He had at least four children, Hannah H. Liggett, who was active in the temperance movement; Joseph Lindley Hoag who was a druggist; Zeno K. Hoag; and a son who reportedly died at sea in his teens. He died, aged 72, in Iowa Falls, Iowa.
