= Scudder Parker =

American politician

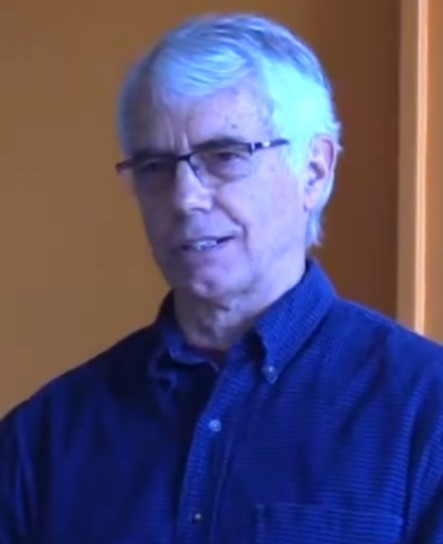
- Parker in 2019

Member of the Vermont Senate
- In office 1981–1988

Personal details
- Born: August 16, 1943 (age 82) Newport, New Hampshire, U.S.
- Party: Democratic
- Spouse: Susan Sussman
- Children: 2
- Education: Williams College (BA); Union Theological Seminary (MDIV)
- Website: Campaign website

Scudder Holden Parker (born August 16, 1943) is an American Democratic politician from Vermont. He served in the Vermont State Senate for eight years.

== Career ==
Scudder Holden Parker was born in Newport, New Hampshire on August 16, 1943. He grew up on a dairy farm in N. Danville, in a region of Vermont known as the Northeast Kingdom. Parker graduated Phi Beta Kappa from Williams College in 1965 and went on to receive his MDiv from Union Theological Seminary of Columbia University in 1968. Parker served as an ordained Protestant minister in UCC churches in East St. Johnsbury and Lower Waterford (1968-1989).

Early in his political career, Parker became the first Democratic Party candidate to win a Vermont State Senate seat in the northeastern region of Vermont. He served four terms in the State Senate from 1981 to 1988. In the Senate, Parker served as chair of the Finance Committee. After serving in the Senate, Parker went on to become the Director of the Energy Efficiency Division of the Vermont Department of Public Service (1990-2003). Parker also served as Chair of the Vermont Democratic Party from 2001 to 2004, and was a member of the Democratic Socialists of America.

After running for office as the Democratic candidate for Governor of Vermont in the election of 2006, Parker worked for a year for Vermont Businesses for Social Responsibility. Parker then worked for the Vermont Energy Investment Corporation (2008-2017), first as the Director of the Consulting Division and then as VEIC's Policy Director. In retirement, Parker has become a published poet, with his first book of poetry, "Safe as Lightning" published in 2020 by Rootstock Publishing.

== Race for governor, 2006 ==
In 2005, Parker announced his intention to run for the Democratic Party nomination for Governor of Vermont in the November 2006 Vermont gubernatorial election. He was assured that nomination when no other Democrat filed by the July 16, 2006 deadline.

Parker started his campaign in the fall of 2005, visiting counties in Vermont and staying there for several days at a time. In the summer of 2006, his campaign staff tripled in number, bringing on full-time field, finance, and communications directors, as well as several support staffers. He received $110,000 in donations in July 2006.

The Parker campaign focused on several issues, including energy, education, health care, and economic development. He released a series of position papers on energy in support of renewable energy sources.

The Republican Party incumbent Jim Douglas defeated Parker, winning 56% of the vote to Parker's 41%.

Party political offices
Preceded by Peter Clavelle	Democratic nominee for Governor of Vermont; 2006	Succeeded by Gaye Symington
