= Andrew P. Donaghy =

Republican politician

Andrew Patrick Donaghy (born 1942) is a Republican politician who was elected and currently serves in the Vermont House of Representatives. He represents the Rutland-1-1 Representative District.
