= 1992 United States Senate election in Vermont =

- November 3, 1992
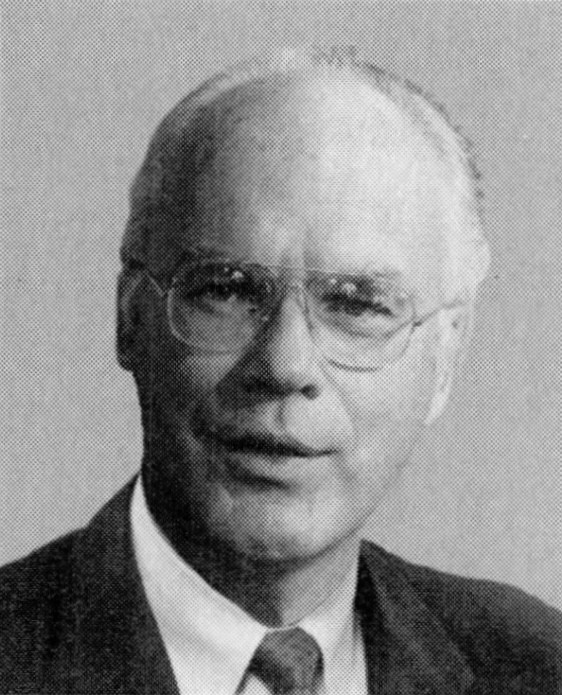

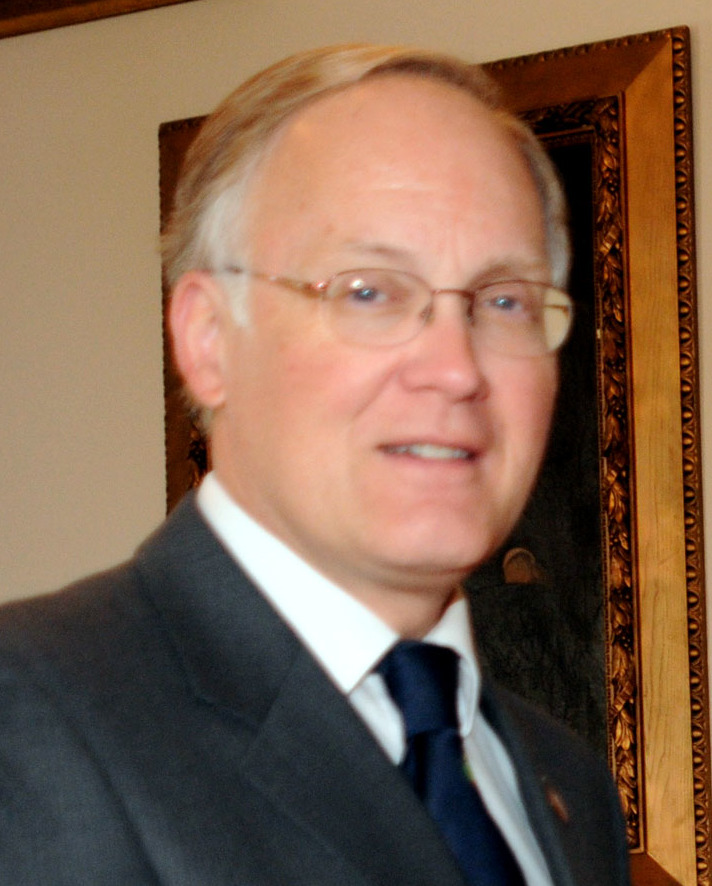
Nominee	Patrick Leahy	Jim Douglas
Party	Democratic	Republican
Popular vote	154,762	123,854
Percentage	54.16%	43.35%
- Leahy: 40–50% 50–60% 60–70% 70–80% Douglas: 40–50% 50–60% 60–70% 70–80%
U.S. senator before election
Patrick Leahy
Democratic
Elected U.S. Senator
Patrick Leahy
Democratic

The 1992 United States Senate election in Vermont was held on November 3, 1992. Incumbent Democratic U.S. Senator Patrick Leahy won re-election to a fourth term.

This was the last time in which a Republican candidate won Caledonia county in a senate election, the last time until 2016 that a Republican candidate would win a county in Vermont in a Class 3 Senate election, and the last time a Republican candidate would lose by less than 20 points in an election for the seat.

== Democratic primary ==
=== Candidates ===
- Patrick Leahy, incumbent U.S. Senator

=== Results ===
Democratic primary results
Party	Candidate	Votes	%
Democratic	Patrick Leahy (incumbent)	24,721	97.59%
Democratic	Write-ins	610	2.41%
Total votes		25,331	100.00%

== Republican primary ==
=== Candidates ===
- Jim Douglas, Secretary of State of Vermont
- John Gropper, businessman

=== Results ===
Republican primary results
Party	Candidate	Votes	%
Republican	Jim Douglas	28,693	78.24%
Republican	John L. Gropper	7,395	20.16%
Republican	Write-ins	586	1.60%
Total votes		36,674	100.00%

== Liberty Union primary ==
=== Candidates ===
- Jerry Levy, sociologist and perennial candidate

=== Results ===
Liberty Union primary results
Party	Candidate	Votes	%
Liberty Union	Jerry Levy	311	91.20%
Liberty Union	Write-ins	30	8.80%
Total votes		341	100.00%

== General election ==
=== Candidates ===
- Jim Douglas (Republican), Secretary of State of Vermont
- Michael Godeck (Freedom for LaRouche)
- Patrick Leahy (Democratic), incumbent U.S. Senator
- Jerry Levy (Liberty Union), sociologist and perennial candidate

=== Results ===
General election results
Party	Candidate	Votes	%	±%
Democratic	Patrick Leahy (incumbent)	154,762	54.16%	−8.99%
Republican	Jim Douglas	123,854	43.35%	+8.85%
Liberty Union	Jerry Levy	5,121	1.79%	+0.99%
Freedom for LaRouche	Michael B. Godeck	1,780	0.62%	
Write-ins		222	0.08%	
Majority		30,908	10.82%	−17.84%
Turnout		285,739		
Democratic hold		Swing		

== See also ==
- 1992 United States Senate elections
