= Jeb Spaulding =

American politician (born 1952)

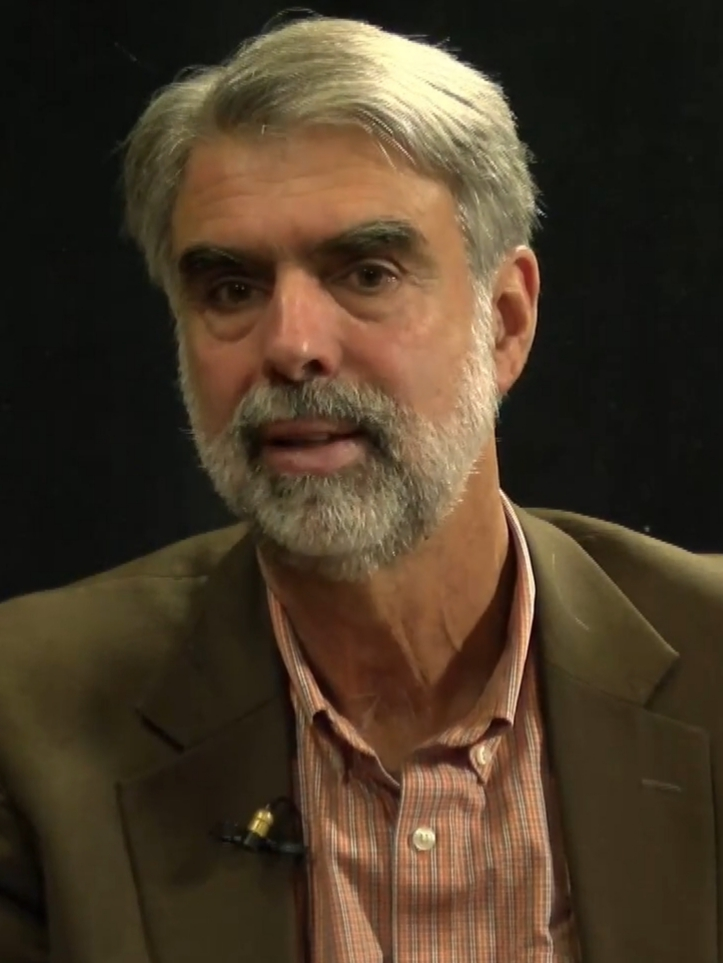
- Spaulding in 2018

5th Chancellor of the Vermont State Colleges
- In office January 2015 – April 2020
- Governor: Peter Shumlin; Phil Scott
- Preceded by: Timothy Donovan
- Succeeded by: Sophie Zdatny

Vermont Secretary of Administration
- In office January 2011 – January 2015
- Governor: Peter Shumlin
- Preceded by: Neale F. Lunderville
- Succeeded by: Justin Johnson

29th Treasurer of Vermont
- In office January 9, 2003 – January 6, 2011
- Governor: Jim Douglas
- Preceded by: Jim Douglas
- Succeeded by: Beth Pearce

Member of the Vermont Senate from Washington County
- In office 1985–2001
- Preceded by: H. Edsel Hughes
- Succeeded by: Phil Scott

Personal details
- Born: George B. Spaulding; December 28, 1952 (age 73) Manchester, Massachusetts, US
- Party: Democratic
- Spouse: Susan Morse
- Education: Antioch College (B.A. 1975), University of Vermont (M.Ed. 1993)

George B. "Jeb" Spaulding (born December 28, 1952) is an American politician and former chancellor of the Vermont State Colleges System. He previously served as Vermont State Treasurer and as Secretary of Administration under Governor Peter Shumlin.

== Biography ==
Spaulding was the founder of radio station WNCS FM 104.7 in Montpelier and was a general partner in Precision Media, Inc. He also served as the director of career and workforce development at the Vermont Department of Education, and as director of the Vermont Academy of Science and Technology at Vermont Technical College. He has been an adjunct professor of communications at Norwich University.

Previously, Spaulding represented the Washington County district for eight terms (1985–2001) in the Vermont State Senate, where he chaired the Appropriations Committee, the Education Committee, the Joint Fiscal Committee and the Joint Committee on Administrative Rules. In 1984, he defeated Republican incumbent H. Edsel Hughes to win one of the district's three seats. In 2000, he did not run for reelection, and Republican Phil Scott won the seat Spaulding vacated.

Spaulding served four terms as state treasurer (2003–2011) and, in 2009, also served as president of the National Association of State Treasurers.

Spaulding considered running for Governor of Vermont in 2010, but opted instead to seek re-election to a fifth term as state treasurer. Spaulding faced token opposition and won re-election with 90% of the vote.

On November 15, 2010, Governor-elect Peter Shumlin nominated Spaulding to be the incoming Secretary of Administration, the senior cabinet position in the executive branch. He resigned as treasurer in January, 2011.

In January 2015, Spaulding left the administration secretary's post to become chancellor of the Vermont State Colleges.

On April 17, 2020, Spaulding announced his plans to close several Vermont State Colleges campuses including Vermont Tech and Northern Vermont University due to funding issues related to student and teacher absence during the COVID-19 outbreak.

Shortly after announcing his plans, Spaulding resigned his post as Chancellor of the Vermont State Colleges due to widespread backlash surrounding the proposal.

== Notes ==
Party political offices
Preceded by Jim Douglas	Democratic nominee for Vermont State Treasurer; 2002, 2004, 2006, 2008, 2010	Succeeded by Beth Pearce
Preceded by John V. Labarge	Republican nominee for Vermont State Treasurer; 2004, 2006, 2008, 2010	Succeeded by Wendy Wilton
Political offices
Preceded by Jim Douglas	Treasurer of Vermont; 2003–2011	Succeeded by Beth Pearce
