= Con Hogan (public official) =

American public official from Vermont

Cornelius "Con" Hogan (d. 2018) was a Vermont public official who served under four governors.

== Early life and education ==
Hogan grew up in New Jersey. He attended Rutgers University and received a master’s degree in government administration from the Wharton School of the University of Pennsylvania.

== Career ==
Hogan's first job was as a corrections officer. He moved to Vermont in 1972 for a position as deputy corrections commissioner. He became full commissioner thereafter serving from 1977 through 1979. He served as the Secretary for Human Services from 1991 to 1999. In 2002 he ran for governor as an independent against Democrat Doug Racine and Republican Jim Douglas, garnering 10% of the vote.

After this he served on the Green Mountain Care Board from its inception in 2011 until he stepped down in 2017. Through the GMCB, Hogan was one of the co-authors of the paper At the Crossroads: The Future of Health Care in Vermont in 2005. He worked in Europe on children’s health issues and wrote three professional books about health care reform. He was an advocate for single-payer healthcare, saying "Every health care system has problems. Ours is wasting time on things like billing and insurance when we should be focusing on providing health care."

He also had a job as executive vice president and then president/director of the Montpelier-based company International Coins & Currency.

== Legacy ==
Howard Dean called Hogan "the most extraordinary public servant of our time." The Vermont Community Foundation created the Con Hogan Award in 2015, a $15,000 cash prize that recognized the work of a Vermont community leader. The award was given out annually until 2024.

== Personal life ==
Hogan, who lived in Plainfield, Vermont, was married to Jeannette Hogan and they had two children. They played in a bluegrass band together called Cold Country.
