= Vermont Agency of Human Services =

American state government agency

Agency overview
- Jurisdiction: Vermont
- Headquarters: Montpelier, Vermont
- Agency executive: Mike Smith, Secretary of Human Services
- Parent agency: State of Vermont
- Website: humanservices.vermont.gov

The Vermont Agency of Human Services (AHS) is a Vermont executive agency (or cabinet agency). Its purpose is to develop and execute policy on human services for the U.S. state of Vermont.

AHS was created by the Vermont Legislature in 1969 to govern all human service activities of the state government. The agency is led by the Secretary, who is appointed by Vermont's governor with the approval of the state senate, and the Deputy Secretary who is appointed by the Secretary with the governor's approval. In 2019, Vermont governor Phil Scott appointed Mike Smith as the new secretary of the Agency of Human Services for the State of Vermont.

== Departments ==
Departments of AHS include:

- Office of the Secretary
- Department for Children and Families
- Department of Corrections
- Department of Disabilities, Aging and Independent Living
- Department of Health
- Department of Mental Health
- Department of Vermont Health Access
