= Central Vermont Community Action Council =

- Company type: Non-Profit
- Industry: social services
- Founded: 1965 (Washington County, Vermont)
- Headquarters: Washington County, Vermont
- Area served: Washington County
- Key people: Hal Cohen
- Website: http://www.cvcac.org/content/view/12/26/

Central Vermont Community Action Council or CVCAC is a non-profit community agency in Washington, Lamoille and Orange Counties founded in 1965 to help people achieve economic sufficiency through individual and family development. The administrative offices are in Barre.

The agency administers a Head Start program.

The agency advises micro-businesses in the process of starting up.

An outreach department assists low income residents in getting help they need by referrals, advocacy and case management.

They provide workforce training and development to people who have significant barriers to employment.

In 2008, the Executive Director earned $95,750

== History ==
In 2008, CVCAC maintained several services for youths: transition services from foster care and for the homeless; program for runaways; court diversion for non-violent crimes; Vermont Youth Development Corps/Americorps; Juvenile restorative program ensuring youths responsible make restitution as required; street checkers on probationers; street (peer) outreach; and Teen Center. These were discontinued.
