= Con Hogan (footballer, born 1881) =

Australian rules footballer

Personal information
- Full name: Cornelius George Hogan
- Born: 18 August 1881; South Melbourne, Victoria
- Died: 22 November 1939 (aged 58); Sandy Bay, Tasmania

Playing career^{1}
Years	Club	Games (Goals)
1904	South Melbourne	1 (0)
- ^{1} Playing statistics correct to the end of 1904.

Cornelius George Hogan (18 August 1881 – 22 November 1939) was an Australian rules footballer who played for the South Melbourne Football Club in the Victorian Football League (VFL).
