= Con Hogan (footballer, born 1903) =

Australian rules footballer

Personal information
- Full name: Conrad Hogan
- Born: 4 October 1903
- Died: 3 March 1987 (aged 83)
- Original team: Birchip
- Height: 180 cm (5 ft 11 in)
- Weight: 85 kg (187 lb)

Playing career^{1}
Years	Club	Games (Goals)
1930–1931	Fitzroy	30 (0)
- ^{1} Playing statistics correct to the end of 1931.

Con Hogan (4 October 1903 – 3 March 1987) was an Australian rules footballer who played with Fitzroy in the Victorian Football League (VFL).
