= Joseph Hoag =

Joseph Hoag (1762–1846) was a prominent Quaker minister in New York and Vermont. He established the Hoag gristmill in the 1790s. Hoag is known for his vision of 1803 "which predicted an American Civil War" as well as his journal, published in 1861, that "precipitated a schism at Scipio Monthly Meeting into Otisite and Kingite groups."

He was married to Huldah Hoag (1762–1850) who was also a Quaker minister. A short memoir about her was written by Lindley Murray Hoag. Many of their ten children also served in the Quaker faith. Swarthmore College has a collection of his papers and family correspondence. Lindley Hoag's three children were Hannah Liggett (a minister and temperance advocate), Zeno Hoag (a minister), and middle child Joseph Lindley Hoag.

Joseph Hoag was the son of Elijah and Phoebe Hoag. He was born in Dutchess County, New York. He married Huldah Case, daughter of Nathan and Elizabeth Case, in Dutchess County in 1782.

According to a biographical description accompanying Swarthmore College's collection of papers related to Hoag, he opposed Elias Hicks and Joseph John Gurney.

Joseph and Huldah Hoag are buried at the Friends Cemetery near the meeting house in Monkton Boro, Vermont.
