= Vermont Council on Rural Development =

Vermont non-profit organization

The Vermont Council on Rural Development is a non-profit, federally supported, state rural development council that combines public and private resources to fund programs that improve the rural communities of Vermont, a largely rural American state. The organization was created in 1992.

== Recent initiatives ==
The organization coordinates two key initiatives around creating a green economy: an initiative called "Vermont Climate Economy Initiative" designed around developing enterprises focused on responding to global warming; and a "Climate Model Communities Program" coordinated with Efficiency Vermont to improve the sustainability of whole communities in Vermont.

Other programs include a community leadership award program, investment in working lands, and regularly policy meetings and summits.
