= Jim Douglas =

Governor of Vermont from 2003 to 2011

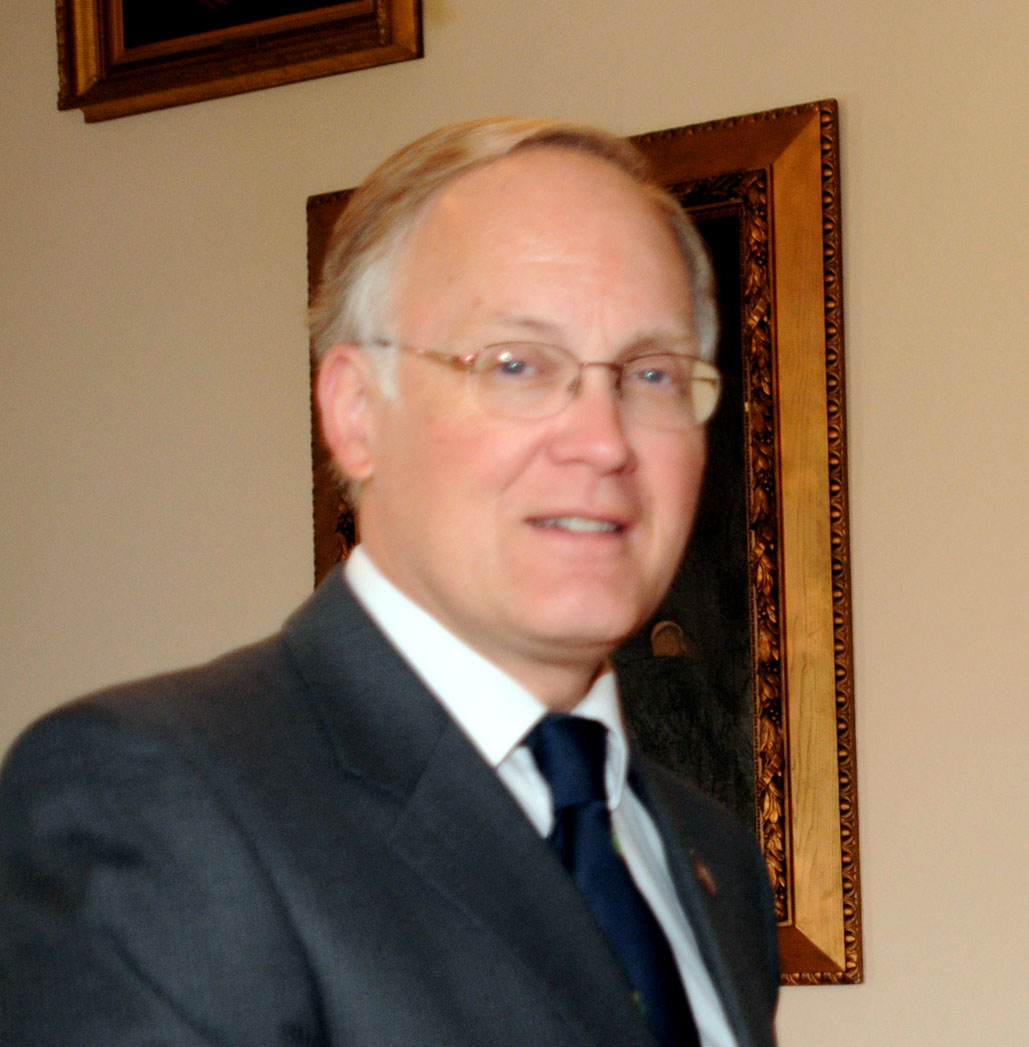
- Douglas in 2009

80th Governor of Vermont
- In office January 9, 2003 – January 6, 2011
- Lieutenant: Brian Dubie
- Preceded by: Howard Dean
- Succeeded by: Peter Shumlin

Chair of the National Governors Association
- In office July 20, 2009 – July 11, 2010
- Preceded by: Ed Rendell
- Succeeded by: Joe Manchin

28th Treasurer of Vermont
- In office January 5, 1995 – January 9, 2003
- Governor: Howard Dean
- Preceded by: Paul W. Ruse Jr.
- Succeeded by: Jeb Spaulding

34th Secretary of State of Vermont
- In office January 8, 1981 – January 7, 1993
- Governor: Richard A. Snelling; Madeleine Kunin; Richard A. Snelling; Howard Dean
- Preceded by: James A. Guest
- Succeeded by: Donald M. Hooper

Personal details
- Born: James Holley Douglas; June 21, 1951 (age 75) Springfield, Massachusetts, U.S.
- Party: Republican
- Spouse: Dorothy Foster
- Education: Middlebury College (AB)

James Holley Douglas (born June 21, 1951) is an American politician from the state of Vermont. A Republican, he served as the 80th governor of Vermont from 2003 to 2011. On August 27, 2009, Douglas announced that he would not seek re-election for a fifth term in 2010. He left the office in January 2011.

On January 6, 2011, Douglas became an executive in residence at Middlebury College where he taught a 24 student course titled Vermont Government and Politics. Douglas is the interim director of the Vermont Historical Society.

Douglas currently serves on the Governors' Council of the Bipartisan Policy Center in Washington, D.C.

== Early career ==
Douglas was born in the city of Springfield, Massachusetts. In 1968, he graduated from East Longmeadow High School in the town of East Longmeadow, Massachusetts. He graduated with a Bachelor of Arts degree from Middlebury College in Middlebury, Vermont, where he had been active in the College Republicans, eventually becoming chairman. At Middlebury College, Douglas was a Russian studies major. Vermont maintained a sister-state relationship with the Republic of Karelia, Russia until it was broken by Governor Phil Scott in March 2022 as protest against the ongoing Russian invasion of Ukraine. While influenced by Douglas, this relationship was started in 1991 under the governorship of Madeleine Kunin.

In November 1972, Douglas was elected to the Vermont House of Representatives, where he became the House Majority Leader during his third two-year term at the age of 25. He left the Vermont General Assembly in 1979, afterwards serving as a top aide to Governor Richard A. Snelling. Douglas was elected Secretary of State in November 1980, a post which he held until 1992. That year he sought election to the U.S. Senate, but was defeated by Democratic incumbent Patrick Leahy.

== Vermont State Treasurer ==
During his tenure as Vermont State Treasurer, Democrat Paul W. Ruse Jr. was criticized for being too friendly with financial services firms that had an interest in matters handled by the state treasurer, including accepting campaign contributions from them, and appearing in an advertisement for one. Because of the controversy, in 1994 Ruse decided not to run for reelection. This decision was not widely known; Ruse stated that he withheld his decision not to run so that Ed Flanagan, the incumbent Vermont State Auditor, would not run for treasurer. Flanagan and Ruse had been involved in a behind the scenes dispute over details of an auditor's report about the treasurer's office; Flanagan disclaimed any interest in the treasurer's post.

As a result of Ruse's decision not to run again, only Douglas had filed as a major party candidate for treasurer; in the absence of a Democratic candidate, Douglas won the Democratic nomination by write-in vote. In the general election, Douglas faced only token opposition, and received over 91% of the votes.

Ruse's deputy had retired in October 1994. After Douglas won the treasurer's election, Ruse offered him the deputy's position so that Douglas would have an opportunity to learn the workings of the treasurer's office. Douglas accepted, and served as deputy state treasurer from November 1994 until beginning his term as treasurer in January 1995. Douglas was reelected in 1996, 1998 and 2000.

== Governor of Vermont ==
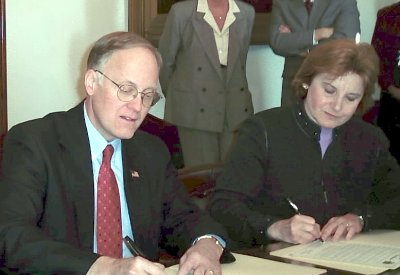
Douglas and EEOC Chair Cari Dominguez sign a resolution aimed at enhancing employment opportunities in state government for people with disabilities.

In the 2002 gubernatorial election to succeed five-term Governor Howard Dean, Douglas achieved a plurality over Democratic Lieutenant Governor Doug Racine, 45 to 42%. The Vermont constitution requires that the legislature select the governor if no candidate receives over 50%. The Vermont General Assembly almost always chooses the candidate who won a plurality, and Racine did not contest the results. In January 2003, the legislature selected Douglas by a vote of 159 to 16. Douglas won reelection to a second 2-year term in 2004, defeating Democrat Peter Clavelle, 59 to 38%.

In early 2005, Douglas announced that he would not run against Democratic-leaning independent Jim Jeffords in the 2006 Senate race. In April 2005, Jeffords announced that he would not seek re-election, which led to speculation that Douglas would throw his hat into the ring against Vermont independent Congressman Bernie Sanders, who had announced his candidacy for the seat. On April 30, Douglas announced again that he would not seek Jeffords' seat, and simultaneously announced that he would run for re-election for governor in 2006. Many pundits believed that Douglas was the only Republican who could possibly defeat Sanders, and his decision to run for governor effectively handed the open Senate seat to Sanders. Douglas was re-elected governor with 57% of the vote over Democrat Scudder Parker.

On May 22, 2007, Governor Douglas signed a landmark civil rights bill banning discrimination on the basis of gender identity by employers, financial institutions, housing, public accommodations, and other contexts. After the Vermont Human Rights Commission recommended that Governor Douglas veto a similar bill in 2006, Douglas worked with legislators to craft a new bill in 2007. This bill passed both chambers of the legislature with overwhelming bipartisan support. Douglas decided to stand for re-election in 2008 and ran unopposed in the Republican primary on September 9, 2008. His principal challengers in the general election were Independent/Progressive Anthony Pollina, and Democrat Gaye Symington. Douglas won a fourth term with nearly 54% of the vote. Although that was his lowest percentage since his initial narrow victory over Doug Racine, he bested his closest challenge, Pollina, by 32%.

Douglas became the first governor to meet with President Barack Obama in the White House on February 2, 2009. He also served as Chairman of the National Governors Association from 2009 to 2010. On April 6, 2009, Douglas vetoed a bill allowing marriage for same-sex couples in Vermont. Democrats in the Vermont House and Senate overrode the veto with a supermajority the next day, marking the first time Douglas had been overridden during his tenure. On June 2, 2009, Democrats in the Vermont House and Senate voted to override Douglas's veto of the Vermont state budget.

On August 27, 2009, Douglas announced that he would not seek re-election in 2010. In early 2010, Douglas became the first American political leader to be appointed to the National Order of Quebec ("L'Ordre National du Quebec" in French), receiving the insignia of an Officer of the order from Premier Jean Charest at a ceremony at the National Assembly of Quebec. He was recognized for strengthening Vermont's historical bonds with Quebec and making improved relations with the province a priority of his governorship. On June 17, 2010, his approval rating stood at 65%.

=== Cabinet and administration ===
The Douglas Cabinet
OFFICE	NAME	TERM
Governor	Jim Douglas	2003–2011
Lt. Governor	Brian Dubie	2003–2011
Secretary of Administration	Michael K. Smith; Charles Plympton Smith; Michael K. Smith; Neale F. Lunderville	2003–2005; 2005–2006; 2006–2008; 2008–2011
Secretary of Commerce & Community Development	Kevin Dorn	2003–2011
Secretary of Natural Resources	Elizabeth "Wibs" McLain; Thomas Torti; George Crombie; Jonathan Wood	2003–2005; 2005–2007; 2007–2008; 2008–2011
Secretary of Agriculture	Steve Kerr; Roger Allbee	2003–2006; 2006–2011
Secretary of Human Services	Charles Plympton Smith; Michael K. Smith; Cynthia LaWare; Robert Hofmann	2003–2005; 2005–2006; 2006–2008; 2008–2011
Secretary of Transportation	Patricia MacDonald; Dawn Terrill; Neale F. Lunderville; David K. Dill	2003–2004; 2004–2006; 2006–2008; 2008–2011
Commissioner of Labor	Michael Bertrand; Patricia MacDonald; Patricia Moulton Powden	2003–2004; 2004–2007; 2007–2010
Commissioner of Public Service	David O'Brien	2003–2011
Commissioner of Public Safety	Kerry Sleeper; Thomas Tremblay	2003–2007; 2007–2011
Commissioner of Banking, Insurance, Securities and Health Care Administration	John Crowley; Paulette Thabault; Michael Bertrand	2003–2006; 2006–2010; 2010–2011
Chief Recovery Officer	Tom Evslin	2009–2010

== Post-gubernatorial career ==
Douglas was succeeded as Governor by Democrat Peter Shumlin.

After leaving office Douglas became an Executive in Residence at Middlebury College and authored a memoir, which was published in late 2012. On July 29, 2015, Douglas was named the interim director of the Vermont Historical Society.

== Electoral history ==
Vermont Gubernatorial Election 2008
Party	Candidate	Votes	%	±%
Republican	Jim Douglas (incumbent)	170,492	53.43	
Independent	Anthony Pollina	69,791	21.87	
Democratic	Gaye Symington	69,534	21.79	

Vermont Gubernatorial Election 2006
Party	Candidate	Votes	%	±%
Republican	Jim Douglas (incumbent)	148,014	56.38	
Democratic	Scudder Parker	108,090	41.17	

Vermont Gubernatorial Election 2004
Party	Candidate	Votes	%	±%
Republican	Jim Douglas (incumbent)	181,540	58.70	
Democratic	Peter Clavelle	117,327	37.93	

Vermont Gubernatorial Election 2002
Party	Candidate	Votes	%	±%
Republican	Jim Douglas	103,436	44.94	
Democratic	Doug Racine	97,565	42.39	
Independent	Cornelius Hogan	22,353	9.71	

Vermont U.S. Senate Election 1992
Party	Candidate	Votes	%	±%
Democratic	Patrick Leahy (incumbent)	154,762	54.16	
Republican	Jim Douglas	123,854	43.35	

== Notes ==
Party political offices
Preceded by Robert Gibson	Republican nominee for Secretary of State of Vermont; 1980, 1982, 1984, 1986, 1988, 1990	Succeeded by James F. Milne
Preceded by Robert Babcock	Democratic nominee for Secretary of State of Vermont; 1982	Succeeded by Bill Sharp
Preceded by Elizabeth Dodge	Democratic nominee for Secretary of State of Vermont; 1988, 1990	Succeeded by Donald M. Hooper
Preceded by Richard A. Snelling	Republican nominee for U.S. Senator from Vermont (Class 3); 1992	Succeeded by Fred Tuttle
Preceded by Michael Smith	Republican nominee for Treasurer of Vermont; 1994, 1996, 1998, 2000	Succeeded by John Labarge
Preceded by Paul Ruse	Democratic nominee for Treasurer of Vermont; 1994, 1996, 1998, 2000	Succeeded by Jeb Spaulding
Preceded by Ruth Dwyer	Republican nominee for Governor of Vermont; 2002, 2004, 2006, 2008	Succeeded by Brian Dubie
Political offices
Preceded by James Guest	Secretary of State of Vermont; 1981–1993	Succeeded by Donald M. Hooper
Preceded by Paul Ruse	Treasurer of Vermont; 1995–2003	Succeeded by Jeb Spaulding
Preceded by Howard Dean	Governor of Vermont; 2003–2011	Succeeded by Peter Shumlin
Preceded by Ed Rendell	Chair of National Governors Association; 2009–2010	Succeeded by Joe Manchin
U.S. order of precedence (ceremonial)
Preceded by Howard Dean as Former Governor	Order of precedence of the United States	Succeeded by Peter Shumlin as Former Governor
