= State rural development councils =

State rural development councils (SRDC) in the United States are a collaborative partnership with representatives of the federal, state, local, and tribal governments, the private sector, and the nonprofit sector. Councils are created by a memorandum of understanding between USDA and the state Governor. The councils’ purpose is to promote rural development within the state. The program supporting the councils were outlined in the 1990 farm bill and reauthorized in 2008. As of 2016, there were 28 recognized SRDCs.

Most of the councils are members of the Partners for Rural America association which was formed in 1998.
