= Jamestown Associates =

American advertising firm

Jamestown Associates is a political, public affairs and corporate advertising firm active in the United States, specializing in media production, direct mail, press relations and campaign management, for candidates of the Republican Party. Its CEO is Larry Weitzner. Among its best-known political clients are Donald Trump (both 2016 and 2020), several governors (including Charlie Baker of Massachusetts, Chris Sununu of New Hampshire, and Chris Christie of New Jersey), Senator Mike Braun, and the Republican National Committee. Past corporate and governmental clients include Pfizer, Johnson & Johnson and the New York City Department of Environmental Protection.

== Overview and awards ==
Jamestown Associates is currently headquartered in Philadelphia.

As of the end of the 2010 general election season, Jamestown Associates was the 7th largest grossing Republican consulting firm in the United States.

Campaign ads produced by Jamestown have been cited in various media sources among the most notable in various election seasons over the past two decades—by the New York Times in 1998, and by the Washington Post in 2006 (their selection of that year's "Best Campaign Commercials"). The firm has won a number of Pollie Awards and Reed Awards. In 2016, Jamestown received 9 Pollie Awards and 8 Reed Awards, the most that year of any political consulting group, according to Campaigns & Elections magazine and the American Association of Political Consultants. In February 2017, Jamestown received 7 Reed Awards for ads and mail, again the most of any firm.

By Jamestown's count, over the total 2015–16 election cycle and including all clients, the firm produced more than 22 million pieces of mail as well as 398 TV, radio and web advertisements.

== 2010–2020 – Candidates for governor and Congress ==
In 2010, Weitzner and Jamestown worked for several candidates winning election for the first time, as Republicans recaptured control of the U.S. House of Representatives. Among Jamestown clients capturing Democratic seats were Frank Guinta (NH), Richard Hanna (NY), Tim Walberg (MI), Bob Dold (IL) and Joe Walsh (IL). Jamestown also produced ads for businessman Bill Binnie, in his unsuccessful bid for Senate from New Hampshire.

In February 2011, Jamestown client Jonathan Perry won a special election for State Senate in Louisiana, which gave the Republicans control of both houses of the Louisiana legislature for the first time since Reconstruction. In a mild controversy, the firm said in October 2010 that a contractor it hired had used the phrase "hicky blue collar" in describing the actors wanted for a National Republican Senatorial Committee ad to be broadcast in West Virginia.

Beginning in 2012 and continuing through 2016, Miller and Jamestown took on several insurgent candidates challenging Republican incumbents. These included Richard Mourdock, in Indiana (who defeated longtime Sen. Richard Lugar in the 2012 primary, losing to Democrat Joe Donnelly in the fall; Congressman Paul Broun, who lost his nomination bid for Georgia Senator; and radiologist Milton Wolf, who nearly upset Kansas Sen. Pat Roberts in the August 2014 primary. They were retained by the Club for Growth PAC, in its challenge to a GOP incumbent in Mississippi and support for a Tea Party conservative (Ben Sasse) in Nebraska. And in early 2015, they were retained by the presidential campaign of Tea Party insurgent Ted Cruz for the GOP nomination. Political reporter Stuart Rothenberg noted in February 2014: "New Jersey–based Jamestown [w]as a regional consulting firm that worked mostly with moderate or even liberal Republicans running in the Northeast. Now it has become a national firm (with offices around the country) that will be one of a handful of firms promoting anti-establishment libertarian and tea party hopefuls this cycle. . . .it's also a fascinating story of how a media firm has evolved and adapted to a changing political environment."

At the same time, Jamestown continued to work for more moderate and "mainstream" Republicans. Their 2012 clients included longtime St. Sen. Joe Kyrillos, who lost his bid for U.S. Senate from New Jersey, and in 2013 they produced ads and direct mail for the successful re-election of Gov. Chris Christie in New Jersey. Indeed, Jamestown produced ads for four winning gubernatorial campaigns in four years—Christie in 2013, Massachusetts Governor Charlie Baker in 2014, Kentucky Governor Matt Bevin in 2015 and New Hampshire Governor Chris Sununu in 2016. Jamestown also produced ads for the losing gubernatorial primary effort of businessman Bruce Lisman in Vermont. Baker, a moderate running in liberal Massachusetts, hired Jamestown in the final months of 2014. His closing 90-second spot, "Remarkable State," was dubbed "the selfie ad" and was described as "...one of the best campaign ads I saw . . . featuring clip after clip of the candidate posing for selfies with voters across the state" by political author Kristin Soltis Anderson.

in 2013, Jamestown produced ads for Mark Sanford's comeback campaign for the U.S. House, following the former Governor's scandalous affair with an Argentinian journalist and subsequent divorce. Despite being actively shunned by national party committees and major donors, Sanford won the GOP nomination with 56.5%, and then captured the coastal 1st District seat with 54% in the May special election.

In 2015, Jamestown was the principal media and communications consultant for Matt Bevin gubernatorial campaign in Kentucky. Bevin, who had lost his insurgent challenge to Senate Majority Leader Mitch McConnell a year earlier, was the surprise winner of a three-way fight for the nomination in May—a victory attributed in part to a closing ad by Jamestown, "Food Fight." After a hard-fought campaign in which he trailed in most public surveys, Bevin that November posted a 53% to 44% victory against attorney general Jack Conway.

The firm's most notable work in 2018 was on behalf of businessman Mike Braun of Indiana, one of three leading challengers for the GOP nomination to face one-term Democratic incumbent Joe Donnelly, a marquee race in the fight to control the US Senate. Braun, the underdog against better-known Congressmen Todd Rokita and Luke Messer used a Jamestown ad to highlight his outsider / non-politician status, carrying cardboard cutouts. Braun won the primary, and beat Donnelly in the general. "Difference" was called one of the best ads of 2018 by Roll Call newspaper, and was praised for its effectiveness by POLITICO, PBS, and ABC News.

In 2016, 2018 and 2020, Jamestown created ads for the successful gubernatorial campaigns of Chris Sununu in New Hampshire.

== 2016 presidential campaign ==
=== Cruz, March 2015 to May 2016 ===
Jamestown served as the lead media firm in the presidential primaries for the losing campaign of Ted Cruz, placing second to Trump. Weitzner produced ads, with his then-Executive Vice President Jason Miller serving as a senior media spokesman. One of Jamestown's primary spots, "Cruz Commander," was named by Time magazine among the top 10 most notable advertisements of the year.

=== Trump, June to November 2016 ===
In the fall presidential campaign, Jamestown was the primary media firm producing TV spots for Donald Trump, according to AdWeek magazine. Miller served as Senior Communications Advisor (and frequently chief spokesman), and Larry Weitzner was lead ad creator. The firm's most-seen ads came in the campaign's final two months.

Weitzner told the Washington Post, "Mr. Trump wanted high-energy, high-impact ads that fit his message, and that is what we gave him. He instantly rejected ads he deemed 'boring.' . . . Mr. Trump is also a pro when it comes to production and lighting. We had to make sure lighting and set-ups were perfect on production shoots. . . . Submitting spots for review was another unorthodox aspect of the campaign. Steve Bannon, Jared Kushner and Brad Parscale directed me to produce spots for review without approving scripts—they wanted to see our vision. I loved that. It gave us a chance to do some interesting ads without idly waiting around for script approval. One of the closing ads, “Choice” was the result of a brainstorming session at Jamestown Associates’ Philadelphia office, where our team came up with the concept of uniquely focusing on one American voter and the choice she was tasked with making."

"Movement" (a 30-second TV spot) "particularly satisfied Mr. Trump's desire for high-energy, high-impact, non-boring communication. Steve Bannon and KellyAnne Conway told me we needed an ad capturing the fact that Mr. Trump started 'a movement, not a campaign,'" Weitzner related in December. "The ad isn't issue-oriented, but it captures the feeling everyone on the Trump campaign, everyone at his rallies, and everyone supporting his candidacy saw as great enthusiasm for his movement." The spot was later honored with the Reed Award for Ad of the Year 2016 by Campaigns & Elections magazine.

The two-minute summation piece, "Argument for America," had an unusual genesis, Weitzner said. "It was originally produced as a web video. After seeing it and sharing it with the Trump team, Parscale—who gets credit for the idea—told me, 'Everyone loves it, we are putting it on TV.' Now, that is unorthodox. Two-minute political commercials don't usually air nationwide. It blew up on social media, with more than 8 million hits, greater than any TV ad produced by either campaign. So many people have told us that ad was the turning point in deciding to vote for President-elect Trump."

After the election, Miller left Jamestown and joined the Trump transition team, serving as its chief spokesman. He was offered, but turned down the job of White House Communications Director, and later took a senior position with Teneo, a corporate advisory and lobbying firm. Miller stated that he wished to spend more time with his family. His decision came after allegations of personal involvement with a Trump campaign staffer. He later sold his partnership in the firm.

== 2020 presidential campaign ==
Jamestown continued its close association with the Trump operation after 2016, producing ads aired (at great expense) during the 2019 World Series and proximate to the Super Bowl in January and February 2020. The World Series ad, "No Mr. Nice Guy" (viewable here), touted Trump's achievements while taunting his opposition in Congress: "The Democrats would rather focus on impeachment and phony investigations, ignoring the real issues. But that's not stopping Donald Trump. He's no Mr. Nice Guy, but sometimes it takes a Donald Trump to change Washington." The ad cost $250,000 to broadcast nationally, and was noted as one of the earliest ever to be aired by an incumbent President.

The first Super Bowl ad was "Got It Done," featuring Alice Marie Johnson and highlighting Trump's criminal-justice reform bill, which freed many low-level offenders like Johnson who had served disproportionate sentences. An NPR analysis contrasted the impact of the two ads: "One ad seemed aimed right at his base supporters, while the other was a rare pitch to those who might not be among his core voters."

The second was "Stronger, Safer". Chris Cillizza of CNN termed it "a pitch-perfect, 30-second distillation . . . Notice how the Trump campaign—right off the bat—tries to mitigate Trump's demeanor and tone in office. 'Americans demanded change,' says the ad's narrator. 'And change is what we got.'" The two 30-second Super Bowl ads, costing an estimated $11 million to air, came at a high-water mark for Trump, with the economy still strong and COVID weeks away.

Through the summer and into the fall, as Trump's prospects darkened, Jamestown continued as one of the Trump campaign's ad makers, creating several that were hard-hitting and controversial. "Break-In," first aired in July 2020 in swing-markets like Orlando, Tampa, and Cincinnati, raised the specter of cuts in police funding (advocated during the BLM protests of May and June), and tying this to Biden, who with his allies hotly disputed this charge. The Los Angeles Times called it "a mini-thriller that shows an older woman telephoning 911 to report an intruder, but all she gets is a recording. 'Joe Biden wants to defund the police,' the ad claims. 'You won't be safe in Joe Biden's America.'”

Other Jamestown ads for Trump, such as "Abolished" and "You Won't Be Safe" drove the point further, and were also attacked as inaccurate and unfair to Biden. In December 2020, after the election, the president-elect acknowledged the effectiveness of Trump's defund-the-police attacks: ". . .They beat the living hell out of us across the country, saying that we're talking about defunding the police. We're not. We're talking about holding them accountable."

Jamestown also created Trump's Latino-targeted ads, including "Sammy's," featuring husband-and-wife business owners and "Capacidad Mental". Trump's blue-collar Latino ads were later credited by POLITICO for helping him to increase vote margins in 78 of 100 Hispanic-majority counties, from 2016 to 2020.

== Current management ==
In 2018, Executive Vice Presidents Barney Keller and Jon Kohan were promoted to partner, and former Vice President Lisa Morrison was named partner and Chief Operating Officer of the firm. Carlos Cruz (formerly with the Republican Party of Iowa) and John Corbett were named Vice Presidents in 2021. Weitzner remains CEO.

== Clients (partial list) ==
2020

- President Donald Trump
- RJC for Susan Collins for U.S. Senate, ME
- Chris Sununu for NH
- Jason Lewis for U.S. Senate, MN
- Bradley Byrne for US Senate, AL
- Lisa McClain for US House MI-10
- Jay Obernolte for US House CA-8
- Jeff Van Drew for US House NJ-2

2018

- Mike Braun for U.S. Senate, Indiana
- Charlie Baker for MA Governor
- Chris Sununu for NH
- Bob Hugin for U.S. Senate, NJ
- Hunter Hill for GA Governor
- Foster Fries for WY Governor
- Republican Leadership Committee

2017

- Kim Guadagno for NJ Governor
- Bryce Reeves for VA Lt. Governor
- Chris Brown for NJ State Senate

2016

- President Donald Trump (general election)
- Presidential candidate Ted Cruz (primary elections)
- New Hampshire Governor Chris Sununu
- Vermont gubernatorial candidate Bruce Lisman

2015

- Kentucky Governor Matt Bevin
- Fix the Debt

2014

- A Great Maryland
- Club for Growth
- New York Gubernatorial candidate Rob Astorino
- Congressman Brian Babin
- Massachusetts Governor Charlie Baker
- Senate candidate Paul Broun
- Senator Ted Cruz
- Congressman Ron DeSantis (FL)
- Drug Free Florida
- Freedom Partners
- Generation Opportunity
- Congressman Richard L. Hanna
- Congressman Jody Hice
- Congressman Sam Johnson
- Florida state Representative Mike LaRosa
- Congressman Barry Loudermilk (GA)
- Connecticut Gubernatorial candidate John P. McKinney
- Congressman Dan Newhouse
- Congressman Dennis Ross (FL)
- Congressional candidate Jake Rush
- Congressman Mark Sanford (SC)
- Senate Conservatives Fund
- Congressional candidate Tony Strickland
- Congressman Fred Upton
- Congressman Tim Walberg
- Senate candidate Milton R. Wolf

2013

- New Jersey Governor Chris Christie

2012

- Senate candidate Richard Mourdock
- Senate candidate Joe Kyrillos of New Jersey
- Congressman Roger Williams (U.S. politician)

2011

- Jonathan Perry (Louisiana State Senate)

2010

- Justin Amash – MI-3
- Robert Dold – IL-10
- Frank Guinta – NH-1
- Richard L. Hanna – NY-24
- Tim Walberg – MI-7
- Joe Walsh – IL-8
- Mary Bono Mack – CA-45
- Sam Johnson – TX-3
- Leonard Lance – NJ-7
- Connie Mack IV – FL-14
- Lee Terry – NE-2
- Tom Horne, Attorney General (AZ)
- Curtis Loftis, State Treasurer (SC)
- Alan Wilson, Attorney General (SC)

2008

- Republican Jewish Coalition

2006

- Former Congressman Mike Ferguson (NJ)
- New Jersey gubernatorial candidate Doug Forrester
- Former Congresswoman Nancy Johnson (CT)
- Connecticut Governor Jodi Rell
- Former Congressman Chris Shays (CT)
