= Peter Galbraith =

American author (born 1950)

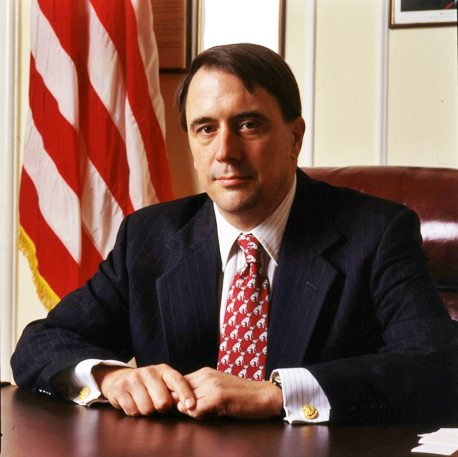
- Formal portrait, 2014

Member of the Vermont Senate from the Windham County district
- In office January 5, 2011 – January 7, 2015
- Preceded by: Peter Shumlin
- Succeeded by: Becca Balint

United States Ambassador to Croatia
- In office June 28, 1993 – January 3, 1998
- President: Bill Clinton
- Preceded by: Position established
- Succeeded by: William Montgomery

Personal details
- Born: Peter Woodard Galbraith; December 31, 1950 (age 75) Boston, Massachusetts, U.S.
- Party: Democratic
- Spouse(s): Sarah Peck Galbraith; Anne O'Leary (divorced); Tone Bringa (divorced)
- Children: 3
- Parent: John Kenneth Galbraith (father)
- Relatives: James K. Galbraith (brother)
- Education: Harvard University (BA); St Catherine's College, Oxford (MA); Georgetown University (JD)

Peter Woodard Galbraith (born December 31, 1950) is an American author, academic, commentator, politician, policy advisor, and former diplomat.

In the late 1980s and early 1990s, he helped uncover Saddam Hussein's gassing of the Kurds. From 1993 to 1998, he served as the first U.S. Ambassador to Croatia, where he was co-mediator of the 1995 Erdut Agreement that ended the Croatian War of Independence. He served in East Timor's first transitional government, successfully negotiating the Timor Sea Treaty. (Note: Chesterman (2001) wrote that "The decision to have Galbraith lead the negotiations [...] was a tactical one." Gunn (2008), on the contrary, wrote that Mari Alkatiri was the "lead diplomat" in the negotiations, "seconded" by Galbraith.)

As an author and commentator, Galbraith, a longtime advocate of the Kurdish people, has argued for Iraq to be "partitioned" into three parts, allowing for Kurdistan independence. Beginning in 2003, Galbraith acted as an advisor to the Kurdistan Regional Government in northern Iraq, helping to influence the drafting process of the Iraqi Constitution in 2005; he was later criticized for failing to fully disclose financial interests relevant to this role.

In 2009, Galbraith was appointed United Nations' Deputy Special Representative for Afghanistan, where he contributed to exposing the fraud that took place in the 2009 presidential election in Afghanistan before being fired in a dispute over how to handle that fraud.

Galbraith served as a Democratic member of the Vermont Senate for Windham County from 2011 to 2015, and was a candidate for governor of Vermont in 2016.

He is Chair of the Board of Directors of the Center for Arms Control and Non-Proliferation, the research arm of the Council for a Livable World.

== Early life and education ==
Galbraith was born in Boston, Massachusetts, the son of John Kenneth Galbraith, one of the leading economists of the 20th century, and Catherine Galbraith (née Catherine Merriam Atwater). He is the brother of economist James K. Galbraith. Galbraith attended the Commonwealth School. He earned an A.B. degree from Harvard College, an M.A. from Oxford University, and a J.D. from Georgetown University Law Center.

== Career ==
=== Academic career ===
Galbraith was an assistant professor of Social Studies at Windham College in Putney, Vermont, from 1975 to 1978. Later, he was professor of national security strategy at the National War College in 1999 and between 2001 and 2003. He is an Honorary Fellow at St Catherine's College. Oxford University. He has been a member of the Board of Trustees of American University of Kurdistan in Duhok since its establishment in 2014.

=== U.S. Senate Committee on Foreign Relations ===
Galbraith worked as a staff member for the U.S. Senate Committee on Foreign Relations from 1979 to 1993. As a staffer, he wrote several reports on Iraq and took a special interest in the Kurdish regions of Iraq. Galbraith contributed to the uncovering of Saddam Hussein's systematic destruction of Kurdish villages and use of chemical weapons after visits in 1987 and 1988. Galbraith wrote the "Prevention of Genocide Act of 1988," which would have imposed comprehensive sanctions on Iraq in response to the gassing of the Kurds. The bill unanimously passed the Senate, and passed the House in a "watered-down" version, but was opposed by the Reagan Administration as "premature" and did not become law.

During the 1991 Iraqi Kurdish uprising, Galbraith visited rebel-held northern Iraq, and narrowly escaped capture by Saddam Hussein's forces as they retook the region. His accounts were instrumental in recording and publicizing attacks on the Kurdish civilian population and contributed to the decision to create a Kurdish "safe haven" in northern Iraq. In 1992, the Kurdish parties gave Galbraith 14 tons captured Iraqi secret police documents from northern Iraq detailing the atrocities committed against the Kurds. He was involved in airlifting the documents to the United States where he deposited them in the files of the Senate Foreign Relations Committee at the National Archives. Galbraith's work in Iraqi Kurdistan was discussed in Samantha Power's Pulitzer-Prize-winning book A Problem From Hell: America and the Age of Genocide.

=== Ambassador to Croatia ===
In 1993, President Bill Clinton appointed Galbraith as the first United States ambassador to Croatia. Galbraith was actively involved in the Croatia and Bosnia peace processes. He was one of three authors of the "Z-4 plan," an attempt to negotiate a political solution to the Croatian War of Independence. Galbraith and UN mediator Thorvald Stoltenberg went on to lead negotiations which led to the Erdut Agreement that ended the war by providing for peaceful reintegration of Serb-held Eastern Slavonia into Croatia. From 1996 to 1998, Galbraith served as de facto Chairman of the international commission charged with monitoring implementation of the Erdut Agreement. Galbraith helped devise and implement the strategy that ended the 1993-94 Muslim-Croat war, and participated in the negotiation of the Washington Agreement that established the Federation of Bosnia-Herzegovina.

During the war years, Ambassador Galbraith was responsible for U.S. humanitarian programs in the former Yugoslavia and for U.S. relations with the UNPROFOR peacekeeping mission headquartered in Zagreb. Galbraith diplomatic interventions facilitated the flow of humanitarian assistance to Bosnia and secured the 1993 release of more than 5,000 prisoners of war held in inhumane conditions by Bosnian Croat forces. Beginning in 1994, on instructions from then-President Clinton, Galbraith tacitly allowed weapons to be shipped into Bosnia through Croatia in violation of a UN arms embargo; this policy generated controversy when made public, with a Republican-led House of Representatives committee referring criminal charges against Galbraith, National Security Advisor Anthony Lake and other Clinton Administration officials to the Justice Department. The Select Committee also investigated Galbraith's personal life, discovering that he had dated an American journalist while a bachelor in Zagreb.

Galbraith was in Croatia's capital, Zagreb, when Serbian forces rocketed the city on May 2 - 3 1995. One of the missiles hit about a block from the U.S. Embassy in the center of Zagreb. Soon after the attack, during his visit to children hospital in Zagreb, Galbraith said: "The children hospital has been attacked. The theater has been attacked. There are four hundred children that are in the basement of this hospital. They have been put at risk from an intentional attack on this city. The only word for it is: barbaric.".

In 1995, when tens of thousands of Serb refugees were being attacked while fleeing to Yugoslavia, Galbraith joined a convoy to protect the refugees, riding on a tractor to send a message of U.S. support and earning him criticism from local Croatian media and officials.

=== East Timor ===
From January 2000 to August 2001, Galbraith was Director for Political, Constitutional and Electoral Affairs for the United Nations Transitional Administration in East Timor (UNTAET). He also served as Cabinet Member for Political Affairs and Timor Sea in the First Transitional Government of East Timor. In these roles, he designed the territory's first interim government and the process to write East Timor's permanent constitution.

During his tenure, Galbraith conducted successful negotiations with Australia to produce a new treaty governing the exploitation of oil and gas in the Timor Sea. The resulting Timor Sea Treaty gave East Timor the preponderance of control over the oil and gas resources and 90% of the petroleum, an "enormously favorable" share. Under the previous Timor Gap Treaty—considered illegal by East Timor and the United Nations—Indonesia and Australia had jointly controlled the resources and shared equally the revenues. According to United States Ambassador to the United Nations Samantha Power, "Galbraith secured a deal by which the Timorese and the Australians would create a Joint Petroleum Development Area from which the Timorese would receive 90% of the revenue and the Australians 10%, a dramatic improvement over the unfair 50-50 split that predated UN negotiations. [...] The Galbraith-led negotiations would quadruple the oil available to East Timor for sale." The negotiations are believed to be the first time the United Nations has a negotiated a bilateral treaty on behalf of a state.

Galbraith also led the UNTAET/East Timor negotiating team during eighteen months of negotiations with Indonesia aimed at normalizing relations and resolving issues arising from the end of the Indonesian occupation. As a Cabinet member, he wrote the regulations that created East Timor's National Parks and Endangered Species Law.

=== Involvement in Iraq's constitutional process ===
From 2003 to 2005, Iraq was involved in a number of negotiations to draft an interim and then a permanent constitution. In that context, Galbraith advised both the Kurdistan Democratic Party (KDP) and the Patriotic Union of Kurdistan (PUK), the two main Kurdish parties of Iraq, particularly with a view to encouraging the emergence of a strongly decentralized state. Galbraith later wrote that he had urged Kurdish leaders to take a stronger position in negotiations, suggesting that "'The Constitution should state that the Constitution of Kurdistan, and laws made pursuant to the Constitution, is the supreme law of Kurdistan.'" Galbraith later wrote that his ideas on federalism "eventually became the basis of Kurdistan's proposals for an Iraq constitution".

Galbraith favors the independence – legal or de facto – of the northern region of Iraq known as Iraqi Kurdistan. Galbraith argues that Iraq has broken into three parts (Kurd, Shiite Arab, and Sunni Arab), that there is no possibility of uniting the country, and that the U.S.'s "main error" in Iraq has been its attempt to maintain Iraq as a single entity. He has advocated for a three-part "partition" of Iraq to reflect this situation, writing, "Let's face it: partition is a better outcome than a Sunni-Shiite civil war." Outside of Kurdistan, which favors its own independence, these ideas are considered offensive to the nationalist feelings of many Iraqis.

==== Oil controversy ====
After leaving the U.S. government in 2003, Galbraith set up a consulting firm that provided negotiating and other services to governmental and corporate clients.

In 2009, an investigation by the Norwegian newspaper Dagens Næringsliv found that Galbraith had been given a large financial stake in DNO, a Norwegian oil company engaged in exploring oil reserves in the Kurdistan region of Iraq, in the spring of 2004. As a result of the provisions Galbraith had helped the Kurds win in constitutional negotiations, which gave the Kurds control over Kurdish oil revenues, Galbraith's stake in DNO had increased greatly in value. At the time of the negotiations, Galbraith had described himself as an unpaid advisor to the Kurds, making only vague references to business interests in the region.

Iraqi officials expressed concern over these revelations, suggesting they may have compromised the constitutional drafting process. Feisal al-Istrabadi, one of the main authors of Iraq's provisional constitution after the Iraq War, said he was "speechless" that an oil company had been given what he described as "a representative in the room, drafting." Abdul-Hadi al-Hassani, vice chairman of the Oil and Gas Committee in the Iraqi Council of Representatives, said that Galbraith's "interference was not justified, illegal and not right, particularly because he is involved in a company where his financial interests have been merged with the political interest." Reidar Visser, a research fellow at the Norwegian Institute of International Affairs, said it was "quite scandalous" that Galbraith had been receiving payment from an oil company while participating in high-level negotiation sessions.

Galbraith responded that, because he had left the U.S. government at the time of the drafting of the constitution, he was acting as a private citizen, in a merely advisory role (not actually negotiating) with no ability to force any particular provision through. He noted that he had supported Kurdish independence since long before receiving a stake in DNO, and also that the Kurdish officials who had requested his advice were aware of his financial involvement, concluding: "So, while I may have had interests, I see no conflict."

In 2010, The New York Times reported that Galbraith and another investor were together paid between $55 million and $75 million for their stakes in DNO. The director of Galbraith's 2016 gubernatorial campaign disputed these figures as too high.

=== Deputy U.N. envoy to Afghanistan ===
Galbraith, considered a close ally of Richard Holbrooke, the U.S. Special Representative to Afghanistan, was announced as the next United Nations' Deputy Special Representative for Afghanistan on March 25, 2009 but abruptly left the country in mid September 2009 at the request of UN Special Representative to Afghanistan Kai Eide following a dispute over the handling of the reported fraud in the 2009 Afghan presidential election - and on September 30, the UN announced that he had been removed from his position by Secretary-General Ban Ki-moon.

In response to his firing, Galbraith told The Times, "I was not prepared to be complicit in a cover-up or in an effort to downplay the fraud that took place. I felt we had to face squarely the fraud that took place. Kai downplayed the fraud.". When Eide announced his own stepping down in December 2009, he did not do so voluntarily, according to Galbraith, though Eide has said it was a voluntary departure.

In December 2009, Kai Eide and Vijay Nambiar accused Galbraith of proposing enlisting the White House in a plan to force the Afghan president, Hamid Karzai, to resign, and to install a more Western-friendly figure as president of Afghanistan. According to reports of the plan, which was never realized, the new government would be led by the former finance minister Ashraf Ghani, or by the former interior minister Ali Ahmad Jalali. Karzai's term expired May 21, 2009, and the Supreme Court, in a controversial decision, extended until voting on August 20, 2009. Galbraith flatly denied there was a plan to oust Karzai. He said he and his staff merely had internal discussions on what to do if a runoff for the presidency were delayed until May 2010 as a result of the fraud problems and other matters. Karzai's continuation in office a full year after the end of his term would have been unconstitutional and unacceptable to the Afghan opposition. Galbraith explained that the internal discussions concerned avoiding a constitutional crisis, that any solution would have required the consent of both Karzai and the opposition, and the UN's involvement was consistent with its good offices role. He noted that Kai Eide, his chief accuser, proposed replacing Karzai with an interim government a month later in a meeting with foreign diplomats in Kabul.

The United Nations announced that Galbraith had initiated legal action against the United Nations over his dismissal. The United Nations has an internal justice system under which such challenges can be lodged. Martin Nesirky, spokesman for the UN Secretary General Ban Ki-moon, said the reason Galbraith "was terminated was that the secretary general determined that such action would be in the interests of the organization".

=== Humanitarian efforts ===
==== Reunification of Yazidi families ====
On March 3, 2021, Peter Galbraith successfully negotiated the reunion of children born to young Yazidi women who had been kidnapped by the Islamic State in 2014 and used as sex slaves (Sabbaya). After the last ISIS stronghold of Barghouz fell in 2019, the Yazidi women and children were moved to al Hol Camp along with the ISIS women and children. The Yazidi House, a Yazidi NGO, searched the camps for the Yazidi women. Once found, the Yazidi House took away the children born to ISIS men and sent the women back to Iraq. The children went to an orphanage in North east Syria. In spite being promised access to their children, the mothers had no contact with the children and were unable to get help from the UN or NGOs. Galbraith negotiated the reunion with the Kurdish authorities in both Iraq and Syria and escorted the mothers into Syria where they saw their children for the first time in two years. After Galbraith signed for the children, the mothers and children went to Iraqi Kurdistan where they await third country resettlement, Eventually Galbraith reunited 26 children with 17 mothers.

==== Rescue of Aminah Mohamad ====
Galbraith organized the July 17, 2021 rescue of Aminah Mohamad, an American-born orphan who had been hidden by radical ISIS women in the Al-Roj refugee camp in Northeast Syria. Aminah's mother, Ariel Bradley, had taken the child to Syria when she joined the Islamic State. Ariel Bradley, who grew up as an evangelical Christian in Chattanooga, Tennessee before converting to Islam, died in a coalition airstrike in 2018.

=== Political career ===
==== Political commentator ====
Galbraith has contributed opinion columns in relation to issues including political developments in Iraq and Afghanistan, for publications including The New York Times, The Washington Post, The Los Angeles Times, The Guardian, The Independent and The New York Review of Books. On Iraq, he has argued that "[c]ivil war and the breakup of Iraq are more likely outcomes [of the invasion of Iraq] than a successful transition to a pluralistic Western-style democracy". He has also argued that the Bush administration "has put the United States on the side of undemocratic Iraqis who are Iran's allies". On the 2009 Afghan Presidential Elections, he wrote in The New York Times that "[if] the second round of Afghanistan's presidential elections [...] is a rerun of the fraud-stained first round, it will be catastrophic for that country and the allied military mission battling the Taliban and Al Qaeda." After the election's second round was canceled, he wrote that "[t]he decision by the Independent Election Commission (IEC) to cancel the second round and declare the incumbent, Hamid Karzai, the victor concludes a process that undermined Afghanistan's nascent democracy."

Conservative New York Times columnist David Brooks called Galbraith the "smartest and most devastating" critic of President George W. Bush's policies in Iraq.

After Galbraith's interests in Iraqi oil were made public, The New York Times wrote that "[l]ike other writers for the Op-Ed page, Mr. Galbraith signed a contract that obligated him to disclose his financial interests in the subjects of his articles. Had editors been aware of Mr. Galbraith’s financial stake, the Op-Ed page would have insisted on disclosure or not published his articles." Meanwhile, The New York Review of Books wrote that "[w]e regret that we were not informed of Mr. Galbraith's financial involvements in business concerning Kurdish oil. If we had known about them, we would have wanted them to be disclosed when his articles were published." In a response, Galbraith defended his involvement in the constitutional process as an informal advisor, but apologized for failing to better disclose his interests as a commentator.

==== Vermont politics ====
Galbraith served as chairman of the Vermont Democratic Party from 1977 to 1979.

In 1998, Galbraith briefly campaigned for the Democratic nomination for the seat in the United States House of Representatives from Massachusetts then held by retiring Representative Joseph P. Kennedy II and previously held by Tip O'Neill and John F. Kennedy.

In 2008, Galbraith told Vermont Public Radio he was considering a run for the governorship of Vermont, but later announced that he would not be running and endorsed former House Speaker Gaye Symington instead.

He is a Senior Diplomatic Fellow, and Chair of the Board of Directors of the Center for Arms Control and Non-Proliferation, the research arm of the Council for a Livable World.

On November 2, 2010, Galbraith won election to the Vermont State Senate from Windham County as a Democrat, and was reelected in 2012. in 2011, Galbraith initiated legislation to ban hydraulic fracturing ("fracking"), making Vermont the first state in the country to ban fracking. In 2014, he introduced the legislation to finance Vermont's single payer health care plan, Act 48, a plan which eventually failed to pass.

Among his Senate colleagues, he gained a reputation for speaking at length on the floor and introducing amendments to almost every bill, and he had a difficult time gaining political allies. According to the Vermont Senate Journal, Galbraith proposed amendments aiming to raise the minimum wage to $12 per hour, to ban corporate campaign contributions, to prevent wealthy persons from evading campaign finance limits, to delete a $5 million appropriation for IBM, to extend Vermont's bottle bill to non-carbonated beverages, to create a subsidized public option on the Vermont Health Connect exchange, to protect large tracts of roadless forest from development, and to return $21 million to ratepayers as a condition of the GMP-CVPS merger. Galbraith's critics said he did not adapt well to the Vermont Senate's culture and described him as "abrasive," and "arrogant", but others in the Senate praised his intelligence, clear thinking, and nonconformism. Governor Peter Shumlin described him as "incredibly articulate, bright and capable." Galbraith did not run for a third term in 2014, citing a desire to focus on his career in international diplomacy.

==== Candidate for governor ====
Galbraith announced in March 2016 that he would be a candidate for the Democratic nomination for Governor of Vermont in 2016. Galbraith ran on an "unapologetically progressive" and "unconventional" platform which included raising the minimum wage, eventually to $15 per hour; establishing universal health care or universal primary health care; and banning campaign contributions from corporations; putting a moratorium on new industrial wind turbines; and eliminating "special interest" tax breaks. Galbraith supported universal background checks for gun sales in Vermont, and called for a ban on assault weapons.

Galbraith came in third in the primary, behind Matt Dunne and the winner Sue Minter, whom Galbraith endorsed. Despite the outcome, he credited his campaign with introducing substantive policy debates, especially over single-payer health care, into the race.

== Personal life ==
Galbraith has one child with his first wife, Anne O'Leary, and two children with his second wife, Tone Bringa.

Galbraith was a good friend of the twice-elected Prime Minister of Pakistan Benazir Bhutto, dating back to their time together as students at Harvard and Oxford Universities; he was instrumental in securing Bhutto's release from prison in Pakistan for a medical treatment abroad during the military dictatorship of General Muhammad Zia-ul-Haq.

Galbraith speaks English, German, Russian, French, Croatian, and Dari.

== Writings ==
- Galbraith, Peter (2006), The End of Iraq: How American Incompetence Created a War without End; Simon and Schuster. ISBN 0-7432-9423-8
- Galbraith, Peter W. (2008), Unintended Consequences: How War in Iraq Strengthened America's Enemies; Simon & Schuster. ISBN 1-4165-6225-7

== Notes ==
Diplomatic posts
| New office | United States Ambassador to Croatia; 1993–1998 | Succeeded by William Montgomery |
