= Ben Palmer (comedian) =

American comedian (born 1986 or 1987)

Benjamin Phil Palmer, also known by his online alias Palmertrolls, (born 1986 or 1987) is an American comedian and internet celebrity from Atlanta, Georgia.

== Early and personal life ==
Palmer was born in 1986 or 1987. He is a United States Air Force veteran. He also worked as a driver for Uber and Lyft.

== Career ==
He began his career on Myspace in 2006, aged 19. He shifted to Facebook in 2007. He started the project Hope That Helps, in which he would create fake Facebook customer service profiles of corporations (such as IHOP, CVS Pharmacy and Olive Garden, among others), then troll users in comment sections. He also sent fake emails to companies.

Palmer also sued his friends multiple times in order to appear on court shows, where he would perform comedy.

=== Notable Facebook profiles ===
In 2016, he created a fake Facebook profile for Home Depot, which he used to ridicule a Fox News article.

In 2018, he created a fake Facebook profile for the City of Atlanta, and used it to post a Facebook event to implode Stone Mountain, the site of the Ku Klux Klan's recreation. Facebook later banned the account.

In 2021, he made a fake Facebook profile for Walmart, and used it to announce that Walmart was closed on Black Friday.

=== Congressman prank ===
In 2020, Palmer collaborated with a follower who had created a parody website mimicking Parler, called "parler.social". Palmer engaged in a series of prank interactions with politician Ted Yoho, who mistakenly believed he was in contact with representatives from Parler, discussing potential podcast collaborations. Over several months, Palmer, alongside other comedians, created a fake website for Yoho's podcast and recorded episodes with him, during which Yoho unknowingly confessed to controversial statements about Congresswoman Alexandria Ocasio-Cortez. The prank culminated in Palmer and his team attending a summit at Liberty University, where they continued to interact with Yoho and other notable figures such as Ghanaian President John Mahama and former Congresswomen and Presidential Candidate Michele Bachmann of Minnesota before eventually revealing the ruse.

=== Deportation hotline prank ===
In 2025, amid increasing immigration enforcement under the second Trump administration, Palmer created a satirical tip line where people could report anyone they suspected of being an undocumented immigrant, receiving nearly a hundred calls from people unaware of the ruse. Palmer would then call these tipsters back as a representative of the hotline to obtain more information, typically in a deadpan, sarcastic tone highlighting the pettiness, absurdity, or hypocrisy, in the reasons some of the people were calling. For example, one caller called to report her ex-husband's new girlfriend while another tried to report a neighbor for using the wrong trash can. Palmer would then post these calls on his social media pages. A call in which a kindergarten teacher tried to report an American-born student's foreign-born parents, based solely on that with no evidence of illegal activity, went viral on social media, accumulating over 20 million views.

In February 2026, the United States Department of Homeland Security Nashville field office issued an internal BOLO for Palmer and his site. The BOLO was then shared by other law enforcement agencies, including the Illinois State Police, who distributed it further. The BOLO warned law enforcement to look out for Palmer and his site, alleging that Palmer was using it to impersonate immigration authorities despite his website noting it was a parody. The DHS clarified that there was no ongoing investigation into Palmer and that report was for internal awareness only, noting that Palmer posed "no direct threat to life or infrastructure". Palmer, who was unaware of the BOLO until contacted by the media, called the BOLO a "badge of honor" but expressed concern at the potential for the situation to escalate and the possibility of arrest.
