= Jake Rush =

American lawyer

Jacob A. "Jake" Rush

Republican nominee for U.S. House, Florida, District 3
- Opponent: Theodore Scott "Ted" Yoho
- Incumbent: Theodore Scott "Ted" Yoho

Personal details
- Citizenship: United States
- Party: Republican
- Spouse: Anne Rush
- Children: 1
- Parent(s): Robert A. and Kristy Rush
- Education: University of Florida
- Occupation: Attorney

Jacob A. Rush, also known as Jake Rush, is an American attorney known for challenging incumbent Theodore Scott "Ted" Yoho for the United States House of Representatives seat for Florida's 3rd congressional district in 2014.

Rush announced his candidacy on March 24, 2014, with a two-day series of announcements in different Florida towns.

== Platform ==
Stephen Colbert, a comedian, satirically described Rush as a "staunch conservative, a free-market capitalist, small government, walk softly and carry a big stick kind of guy." Colbert also stated that Rush "is running on a platform of traditional marriage, strict constitutionalism, strong national defense, and repealing Obamacare", which Rush agreed was true.

Rush had three main points he listed running on, being:

- Focusing on the economy,
- Decreasing spending, and
- Building a country where private businesses create jobs.

Rush characterized himself as a "straight shooter" and a conservative Republican.

John Konkus, of the GOP consulting firm Jamestown Associates, served as Rush's media adviser. Alex Patton of Ozean Media served as campaign adviser.

Rush was endorsed by the Conservative Party of Florida, a reversal of their endorsement of incumbent Ted Yoho in the last election cycle.

== Career ==
Previously, Rush worked as a Sheriff's deputy at the Alachua County Sheriff's Office under Sheriff Steve Oelrich. While in that position, part of Rush's roles were to investigate D.U.I.s. Rush returned to the force after law school, still at the A.S.O., as a volunteer reserve deputy.

As of mid 2014, Rush works for his father's firm, the Law Office of Robert A. Rush, otherwise known as Rush & Glassman. As of late 2019, Rush is no longer employed with that firm.

== Personal life ==
Rush is the son of Robert and Kristy Rush and was raised in their home town of Gainesville, Florida. Robert is a graduate of Johns Hopkins University and the University of Florida. He was a producer of the Gainesville production of Elvis People, working with associate producer Emilee MacDonald and playwright Doug Grissom.

After high school, Rush was selected to attend the West Point Military Academy, but declined the offer to attend the University of Florida, his father's alma mater. He graduated with an undergraduate degree in Classics. While at university, Rush participated in the Theatre Strike Force, an improv acting club.

Rush received national attention for his involvement in live action role playing (LARP). Rush is a member of The Mind's Eye Society, an online role playing community described as "not dissimilar from Dungeons & Dragons, but with a Gothic supernatural bent." He is also a leader in the Gainesville Covenant of the Poisoned Absinthe, a live action roleplaying group made up "of an assortment of games from White Wolf's selection, including Vampire: The Masquerade, Changeling: The Lost, and Mage: The Awakening."

Prior to announcing his candidacy, Rush deleted some photos and websites regarding his role-playing activities, and told the Gainesville Sun that "I had scrubbed as much as I could Google of myself, just because it's a little embarrassing, and I didn't want it to overshadow my campaign. I didn't want this to happen, basically."

Rush and his wife Anne have one child, named Victor.
