= A. J. Delgado =

American columnist (born c. 1977)

Arlene Delgado
- Born: c. June 1977 (age 49); Anchorage, Alaska, U.S.
- Education: University of Florida (BA); Harvard University (JD)
- Political party: Republican
- Children: 1

Arlene "A. J." Delgado (born c. 1977) is an American attorney, political commentator, and writer. She was a senior advisor to the Donald Trump presidential campaign in 2016 and worked for the Trump transition team after the 2016 election.

== Early life and education ==
Delgado was raised in Miami, Florida, and is the daughter of immigrants from Cuba. She graduated from the University of Florida and Harvard Law School.

== Career ==
After law school, Delgado worked as an attorney in a New York City law firm for several years. She then returned to Miami and began engaging in political commentary, including on Twitter, as well as the National Review, The American Conservative, Breitbart, Sean Hannity's radio show, and Mediaite. In 2015, she began to express support for then-candidate Donald Trump, including in her writing for Breitbart and The Washington Post, as well as in appearances on cable television.

In September 2016, Delgado was hired as a senior advisor to the Trump campaign, with her role focused on Spanish-language media and national television. She then became prominent as a spokesperson for the Trump campaign, including to defend Trump against sexual misconduct allegations.

According to Delgado, she began an intimate relationship with Trump campaign chief spokesperson Jason Miller, who was married at the time, in mid-October 2016. Delgado says that Miller told her at the time that he was in the process of getting divorced from his wife. After the election, Delgado and Miller were hired by the Trump transition team, and according to Delgado, their relationship continued and then she learned she had become pregnant. Before the appointment of Miller as White House Communications Director was announced, Delgado informed White House aides of their relationship, and after the appointment was announced, she wrote a series of tweets, including "Congratulations to the baby-daddy on being named WH Comms Director!". Miller declined to accept the administration position shortly thereafter on December 24. Delgado then deactivated her Twitter account after Miller made his announcement.

Delgado was not hired to work for the Trump administration and then moved to Miami and into the residence of her mother, and gave birth to her son in July 2017. She announced the birth on Twitter, which was followed by tabloid coverage in The New York Post and Miller confirming parentage. Delgado responded on Twitter and gave an interview to McKay Coppins at The Atlantic, and explained to Coppins, "It's a matter of defending my son."

In May 2018, Delgado tweeted commentary that derided the claims made by Trump about the FBI spying on his 2016 campaign and described the claims as "embarrassing". In 2018, Delgado and Miller engaged in litigation over the custody of their child, and in 2019, litigation about child support and court-ordered legal expenses. In December 2019, Delgado filed a lawsuit in federal court against the Trump transition team and specific officials based on allegations of pregnancy and sex discrimination. In 2021, Delgado tweeted about the child support litigation and other issues related to their child. Jake Tapper later told Miller on Twitter, in a discussion about the Donald Trump feud with Brad Raffensperger, "and while I have your attention pay your child support", to which Miller tweeted back an accusation that Tapper is a "fake news pussy".

== Book ==
She self-published her book Hip To Be Square: Why It's Cool To Be A Conservative in 2012.
