= Sue Minter =

American politician (born 1961)

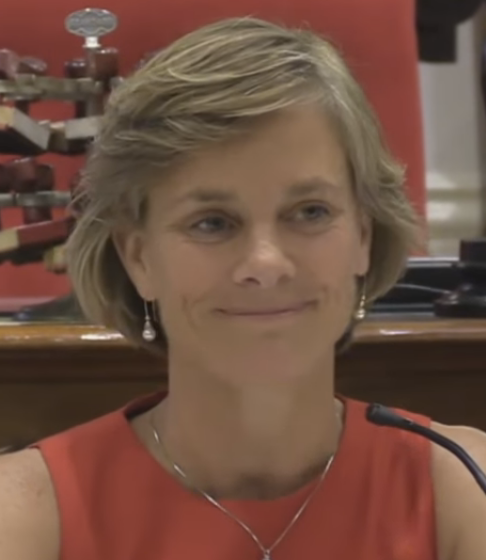

Secretary of the Vermont Agency of Transportation
- In office January 1, 2015 – September 11, 2015
- Governor: Peter Shumlin
- Preceded by: Brian Searles
- Succeeded by: Chris Cole

Member of the Vermont House of Representatives from the Washington-Chittenden-1 district
- In office January 5, 2005 – January 5, 2011
- Preceded by: Val Vincent
- Succeeded by: Rebecca Ellis

Personal details
- Born: January 23, 1961 (age 65) Bryn Mawr, Pennsylvania, U.S.
- Party: Democratic
- Spouse: David Goodman
- Children: 2
- Education: Harvard University (BA); Massachusetts Institute of Technology (MUP)

Sue M. Minter (born January 23, 1961) is an American politician from the state of Vermont. She served in the Vermont House of Representatives from 2005 to 2011, led Vermont's recovery efforts after Tropical Storm Irene, and became secretary of the Vermont Agency of Transportation in 2015. Minter was the Democratic Party nominee in the Vermont gubernatorial election of 2016. She lost to the Republican Party nominee Phil Scott.

== Early life and career ==
Minter was born in Bryn Mawr, Pennsylvania, the daughter of Evelyn and Robert Wilson "Bob" Minter, who managed a candy business, Minter's Candies. Her family moved to Providence, Rhode Island, while she was in high school. Minter graduated from Moses Brown School in 1979 and from Harvard University with a concentration in sociology in 1983. She then earned a master's degree in urban planning from the Massachusetts Institute of Technology. She moved to Vermont in 1991 to become a consultant for Conservation Law Foundation.

== Political career ==
=== State representative ===
Minter ran for the Vermont House of Representatives in 2004, representing the Washington-Chittenden-1 district (Duxbury, Waterbury, and Huntington). She won, and was reelected for four terms. She served on the Transportation and Appropriations committees, in positions which emphasized budgeting over policy-making, and earned a reputation as a "solid" but not "ultra-liberal" Democrat with a good understanding of complex budget issues.

=== Vermont Agency of Transportation ===
Peter Shumlin, the Governor of Vermont, appointed Minter as Deputy Secretary of the Vermont Agency of Transportation in January 2011. Following Tropical Storm Irene, Shumlin appointed Neale Lunderville to lead Vermont's recovery efforts, and four months later named Minter to replace him. Minter was praised for her leadership as chief recovery officer. She later served on President Barack Obama's Task Force on Climate Preparedness and Resilience, co-chaired the White House Task Force Subcommittee on Disaster Recovery and Resilience, and led a Vermont team which assisted with Colorado's response to major flooding in 2013.

Minter became Secretary of VTrans on January 1, 2015, following the retirement of Brian Searles. In response to an August workplace discrimination lawsuit against VTrans, she boosted employee training in harassment prevention and established an affirmative-action task force.

=== Candidate for governor ===
In September 2015, Minter resigned from her position at VTrans to run for governor in the 2016 gubernatorial election. Minter's former House colleagues described her as left-of-center and praised her as a "good Democrat" with a talent for understanding complicated budget issues, but questioned her preparedness for a gubernatorial run. Minter was endorsed by former Vermont Governors Madeleine Kunin, Howard Dean and Phil Hoff; former lieutenant governor Doug Racine; and former state representative Jason Lorber; along with 52 current legislators and 25 more former legislators, as well as the pro-choice Democratic group EMILY's List. Environmentalist Bill McKibben initially supported her rival Matt Dunne, but switched his support to Minter after Dunne revised his position on wind power.

Minter proposed job creation efforts involving strategic investments in infrastructure and housing, as well as industry-government collaboration to promote the technology, energy, and agricultural sectors. Her proposed "Vermont Promise" initiative would have paid for Vermont high school graduates to attend the Community College of Vermont or Vermont Technical College for two years for free, and for half of the current price afterwards.

Minter believes Vermont's pension fund should divest from coal holdings because they are "bad for our economy and bad for our environment." Minter followed her rival Matt Dunne in rejecting campaign contributions from corporations, writing "Whether you are a multimillionaire or a major corporation, you shouldn't be able to buy the governor's office." After the 2015 Colorado Springs Planned Parenthood shooting, she called for universal background checks on gun sales in Vermont, a position later taken up by her rivals. She also supports a ban on assault weapons.

On August 9, Minter won the Democratic Party nomination for governor, defeating Dunne and Peter Galbraith in the primary election. She faced Republican Phil Scott, the Lieutenant Governor of Vermont, in the November general election. Minter lost to Scott, 52% to 44%.

== Post-political career ==
In September 2017, Minter became the president and chief executive officer of Special Olympics Vermont. She resigned from the job in September 2018. In December 2018, Minter became executive director of Capstone Community Action, a community action agency in Vermont that works to meet basic needs, advocate for economic justice and lift low-income people out of poverty. In November 2024, Minter announced she would be stepping down from her position at Capstone Community Action at the end of 2024.

== Personal life ==
Minter lives in Waterbury, Vermont, with her husband David Goodman (brother of Amy Goodman, a journalist for Democracy Now!). They have two children.

Party political offices
Preceded by Peter Shumlin	Democratic nominee for Governor of Vermont; 2016	Succeeded by Christine Hallquist
