= Jason Miller (communications strategist) =

American political adviser and CEO (born 1975)

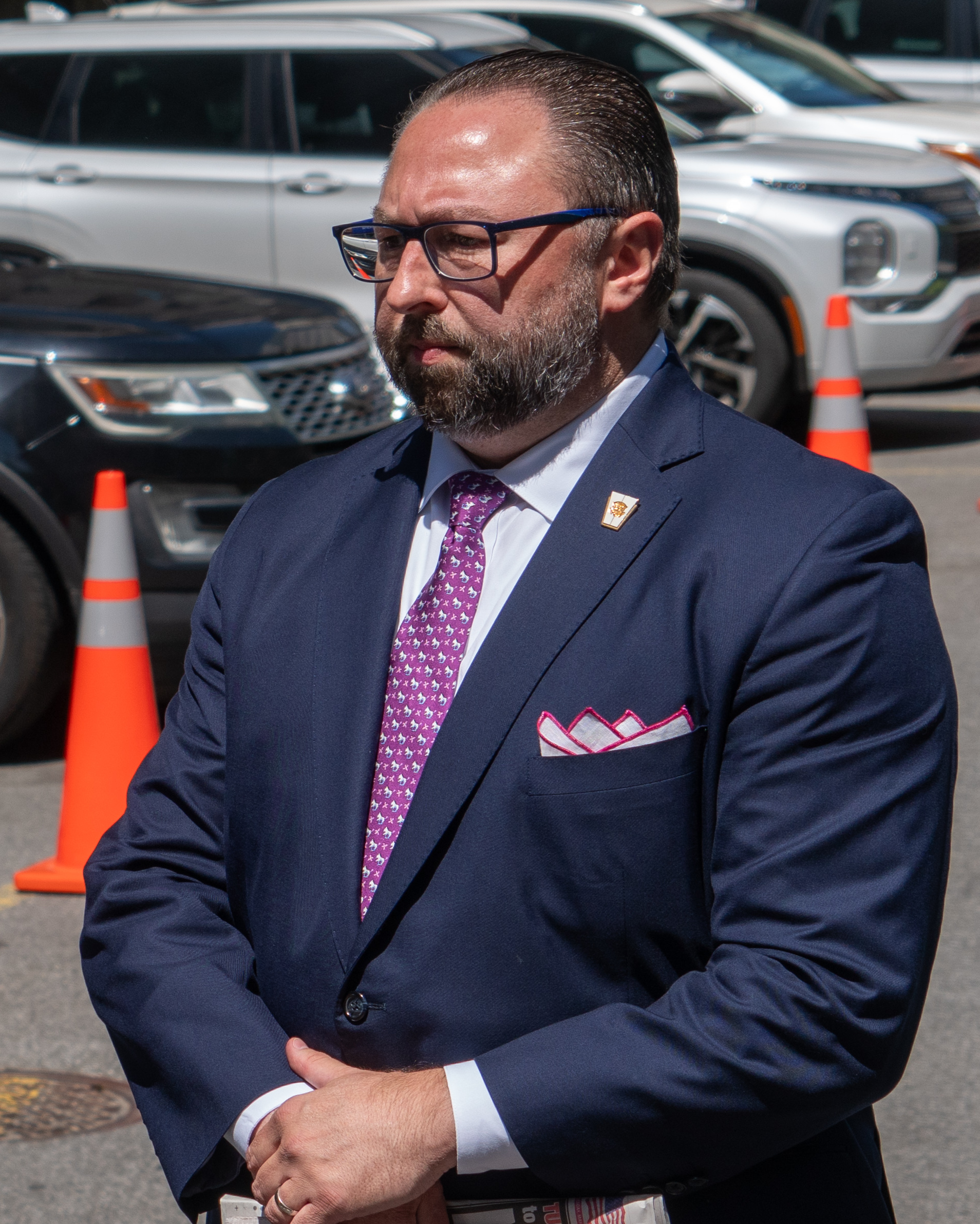
- Miller in 2024
- Born: 1974 or 1975 (age 50–51); Edmonds, Washington, U.S.
- Education: George Washington University (BA)
- Political party: Republican
- Spouse: Kelly Miller
- Children: 2 with Miller; 1 with Delgado

Jason James Miller (born 1974 or 1975) is an American communications strategist, political adviser, and CEO best known as the chief spokesman for the Donald Trump 2016 presidential campaign and transition of Donald Trump. He was a senior adviser to Trump's 2020 reelection campaign. From 2010 to 2016, Miller was a partner and executive vice president at Jamestown Associates. He was initially announced as the incoming White House Communications Director during the presidential transition, but soon withdrew amid news of an extramarital relationship with a staffer who joined the 2016 campaign two months before the election.

In 2017, Miller became a contributor on CNN. He left the position in 2018 amid allegations reported by Gizmodo, including spiking an erotic dancer's drink with abortion medication. Both alleged participants denied this under oath in federal court. In unsealed court documents from a defamation case Miller filed against Gizmodo, Miller admitted to hiring prostitutes and having extramarital affairs with two campaign staffers. In March 2021, he became a contributor to Newsmax. Miller left his position as Trump's spokesman in June 2021 to become the CEO of Gettr, a micro-blogging social network with a conservative user base.

In 2023, Miller left Gettr to join Trump's 2024 presidential campaign.

== Early life ==
Jason James Miller was born and raised in Edmonds, Washington. He graduated from Edmonds-Woodway High School in 1993. His father was a welder, and his mother worked as a bookkeeper and receptionist. Miller graduated from George Washington University, where he majored in political science, in 1997.

== Career ==
=== Politics ===
Miller's first job in politics, from 1994 to 1997, was as a staff assistant to U.S. Senator Slade Gorton of Washington.

After graduating from college, Miller moved to San Diego, California, where he spent most of the next year as coalitions director for businessman Darrell Issa, who unsuccessfully sought the Republican U.S. Senate nomination in the 1998 primary. Miller returned to the state in 1999 to serve as Issa's political director in his successful 2000 campaign for California's 48th congressional district. In late 2000, Miller became campaign manager for Ric Keller, who won an open seat in the House of Representatives representing Florida. Miller then served as Keller's chief of staff and led his successful reelection effort in 2002.

From July 2003 to July 2004, Miller managed Jack Ryan's U.S. Senate campaign in Illinois. Ryan won a sharply contested race for the Republican nomination. The Democratic nominee was Barack Obama, then a state senator. Ryan abruptly withdrew from the race after a California judge ordered the unsealing of his custody file, over the objections of both parents, creating a public furor. Alan Keyes replaced Ryan as the nominee. Obama won the general election.

Miller then moved to Florida, where he served as political and communications consultant for Mel Martínez's successful U.S. Senate primary campaign against several well-known contenders. He closed out 2004 doing press and voter-contact consulting in Tom Coburn's winning campaign for the Senate from Oklahoma.

In January 2005, Miller was hired to manage Virginia senator George Allen's reelection campaign. In an amicable parting designed to help Allen's long-term national ambitions, Miller left Allen's campaign in November 2005 to helm South Carolina Governor Mark Sanford's reelection campaign. Allen lost reelection after several major gaffes, while Sanford was reelected. After the campaign, Miller took a job doing strategic planning for Sanford and serving as deputy chief of staff.

In April 2007, Miller moved to New York to join the Rudy Giuliani 2008 presidential campaign as Deputy Communications Director. Giuliani ended his campaign after finishing third behind eventual nominee John McCain in the Florida primary.

In 2008, Miller joined Denzenhall Associates, a D.C.-based public relations firm specializing in crisis communications, advising major corporations, trade associations, and prominent individuals.

=== Jamestown Associates ===
In January 2010, Miller joined the New Jersey–based Jamestown Associates consulting firm as Partner and Executive Vice President, working closely on campaigns with CEO Larry Weitzner.

From 2012 to 2016, Miller and Jamestown took on several insurgent candidates challenging Republican incumbents. These included Richard Mourdock in Indiana (who defeated longtime senator Richard Lugar in the 2012 primary and lost to Democrat Joe Donnelly in the general election) and radiologist Milton R. Wolf, who nearly upset Kansas Senator Pat Roberts in the August 2014 primary. The Club for Growth PAC used Jamestown to help challenge an incumbent in Mississippi and nominate a Tea Party conservative in Nebraska. In 2015, Jamestown worked on Ted Cruz's presidential campaign.

In 2013, Miller returned to South Carolina as an ad producer and strategist for Sanford's comeback campaign for U.S. House after Sanford's scandalous affair with an Argentinian journalist and subsequent divorce. Sanford won the Republican nomination and the May special general election. Of Miller, Sanford chief of staff Scott English said: "He's disciplined in the middle of a firefight. He's good at thinking about, 'What are we talking about? What are we trying to accomplish?' and then going back on message again... A lot of people come into a safe environment where they already know the outcome. He takes on challenges."

In 2015, Miller and Jamestown were the principal consultants for media and communications for Matt Bevin in Kentucky. Bevin, who had lost a primary challenge to Senate Majority Leader Mitch McConnell a year earlier, was the surprise winner of a three-way race for the gubernatorial nomination in May—a victory attributed in part to a closing ad by Miller and Jamestown, "Food Fight". Bevin defeated Democratic nominee Jack Conway in the general election.

=== 2016 presidential campaign and transition ===
During the Bevin campaign and into early 2016, Miller was Ted Cruz's "digital and communications adviser" in his campaign for the Republican presidential nomination. The Washington Post's Katie Zezima wrote that Miller's task was "crafting Cruz's message of unyielding conservatism and spreading it among grassroots groups, where the senator hopes to gain the most support”. Cruz suspended his campaign on May 5 after losing the Indiana primary.

Miller's relationship with Donald Trump dates to before the 2016 campaign. In 2011, when Trump was mulling a 2012 campaign, Miller was slated to serve as campaign manager. On June 29, 2016, the Trump campaign announced it had hired Miller as senior communications adviser. BloombergPolitics called this an attempt to "professionalize" the Trump communications operation. After the announcement, some reporters noted the many anti-Trump tweets Miller had posted during Cruz's campaign.

After the election, Miller was part of the Trump transition team, serving as its chief spokesman from November 2016 to January 2017. On December 22, he was announced as White House Communications Director, but two days later, he declined the offer, saying: "After spending this past week with my family, the most time I have been able to spend with them since March 2015, it is clear they need to be my top priority right now and this is not the right time to start a new job as demanding as White House communications director. My wife and I are also excited about the arrival of our second daughter in January, and I need to put them in front of my career... I look forward to continuing to support the President-elect from the outside after my work on the transition concludes."

Miller's decision came after allegations of an extramarital affair with Trump campaign staffer Arlene J. Delgado. Miller fathered a boy to whom Delgado gave birth in July 2017.

=== After 2016 campaign ===
In January 2017, Miller sold his interest in Jamestown Associates and joined Teneo Strategy. Teneo advises "Fortune 500 CEOs on crisis communications, corporate communications and media relations", according to Axios. As Trump's adviser, Miller had criticized Teneo as a "corporate consultancy" created by Doug Band "to trade off the influence and power gained through the affiliation with [Hillary Clinton]". Miller stayed at Teneo through 2019.

In 2017, Miller became a CNN political contributor. He left the network a year and a half later, citing legal difficulties.

In October 2019, Miller began co-hosting, with Steve Bannon, War Room: Impeachment, a daily radio show and podcast intended to advise the Trump White House and its allies on fighting the impeachment inquiry against Donald Trump. The podcast was removed from YouTube in January 2021, after the 2021 United States Capitol attack.

Trump's 2020 campaign hired Miller as a senior adviser in June 2020. It was alleged that the campaign routed his $35,000 monthly salary through his former firm, making it harder for Delgado to prove his income in court and helping him save about $3,000 per month in child support.

In October 2020, shortly after the FBI announced that it had thwarted an attempt by a right-wing militia group to kidnap Michigan Governor Gretchen Whitmer, Miller said it was "shameful" for Whitmer to call out Trump's divisive rhetoric. Trump had tweeted, "LIBERATE MICHIGAN!" in April 2020, which was seen as a rallying cry for Whitmer's opponents. Miller said, "If we want to talk about hatred, then Governor Whitmer, go look in the mirror."

In the days before the 2020 election, Miller said in an interview that he believed that Trump would win at least 290 electoral votes but that Democrats would try to "steal" the election back. The Republican lieutenant governor of Utah, Spencer Cox, wrote on Twitter that people should "ignore this type of garbage", referring to Miller's remarks. Cox added, "elections are never decided on election night" and did not acknowledge Miller's prediction that Trump would win "over 290" electoral votes on election night. Miller had not said that elections were typically decided on election night.

=== Newsmax ===
On March 18, 2021, it was announced that Miller had joined Newsmax as a contributor.

=== Gettr ===
In June 2021, it was reported that Miller had left the Trump team to become CEO of a tech company. He was replaced by Liz Harrington. On July 1, 2021, Miller launched a beta version of the social network Gettr, which targets conservatives and which Miller has called a "place people won't be canceled". In its first week, Gettr attracted more than 1.4 million users. In a Fox Business interview, Miller said, "prominent Republicans like former Secretary of State Mike Pompeo, House Minority Leader Kevin McCarthy, House GOP Conference Chair Elise Stefanik, former Secretary of Housing and Urban Development Ben Carson and more have joined the platform, along with other popular conservative voices like Charlie Kirk, Monica Crowley, Rogan O'Handley, and more."

=== Second Trump administration ===
In February 2023, Miller left Gettr to work as a senior adviser to Donald Trump's 2024 presidential campaign. In mid-2026 he was named a special government employee and took a senior communications role in the second Trump administration. In October 2026, Miller reportedly arranged transportation for defeated Brazilian conservative presidential candidate Flavio Bolsonaro to the US, where he was granted humanitarian parole in anticipation of receiving legal permanent resident status.

In November 2026, The Washington Post reported that Miller's personal income rose rapidly during the second Trump administration, with his personal assets rising from $879,400 in 2023 to $15,000,000 in 2026. Nearly all of the revenue coming from his two businesses, SHW Partners and Scipio Strategic; some of the payments that were made public included consulting work for the government of India, the hedge fund Bridgewater Associates, and Paramount Skydance.

== Personal life ==
Miller met his wife, Kelly, while working on a congressional campaign in California. They live in suburban Washington, D.C., and have two children.

He also has a child with A. J. Delgado, born six months after his second child.

== Controversies and scandals ==
=== Delgado suits, 2018–2019 ===
On September 14, 2018, A. J. Delgado, with whom Miller fathered a child, sued him in a Miami-Dade, Florida, Circuit Court. The court ordered Miller to pay Delgado thousands of dollars in child support. Miller had said he was working hard to become a "better husband and father" and took his parental obligations "very seriously" and that Delgado had "turned a simple paternity proceeding into all-out war".

Miller and an unnamed Doe denied all parts of an accusation Delgado made in her lawsuit that Miller had drugged Doe with an abortifacient by blending a pill into a fruit smoothie. The ensuing controversy caused him to leave his position at CNN. In the suit, Delgado requested that Miller undergo a psychological evaluation, because she alleged that she was told the story by a Republican lobbyist, and further alleged that journalist Yashar Ali confirmed the story. Miller questioned the propriety of publishing that unverified claim from what was then a sealed Florida court filing, and which was denied by Doe, causing damage to his reputation. He sued Gizmodo Media Group and Splinter News reporter Katherine Krueger for $100 million for reporting the allegation. Chapo Trap House co-host Will Menaker was added as a defendant in the lawsuit after Menaker called Miller a "rat-faced baby killer" in a Twitter post.

The US District Court in New York dismissed Miller's suit, ruling that the "fair report" doctrine (which bars civil actions arising from a "fair and true report of a judicial proceeding") protected Gizmodo from liability for defamation, as it had accurately reported the allegation Delgado had made. In its ruling, the New York court found that Gizmodo had "essentially summarize[d] or restate[d] the allegations" Delgado made; by granting summary judgment to Gizmodo (necessarily occurring before the fact-finding stage in U.S. civil litigation), the New York court did not and could not rule on the allegation's accuracy.

Miller later brought another suit in Florida, which ended in August 2019 when the court granted Gizmodo's motion for summary judgment, as had occurred in the New York case. The Florida court applied similar reasoning as the New York court had to the claims brought against the publication and author. In its opinion granting Gizmodo's motion, the Florida court found that Gizmodo and Krueger (whose article mentioned Delgado's allegations, which Miller and Doe denied) had disclosed the "potential biases" involved in the allegations, writing, "by disclosing this information, Defendants [Gizmodo and Krueger] invite readers to decide for themselves" whether the allegations were credible. The Florida court also found that declarations Krueger and her editors at Gizmodo made suggested that "neither Krueger nor her editors intended to augment the credibility of the accusations...by attributing them to Jane Doe herself." In May 2021, the Florida court approved Gizmodo's request for Miller to pay $42,000 in legal fees Gizmodo incurred in the case.

Neither court's granting of the defendants' motions for summary judgement, which precluded fact-finding by the courts with respect to the underlying allegations against Miller, addressed whether he had done what Delgado alleged. In their answers before the Florida court, both Miller and Doe denied under oath that they had ever had a sexual relationship. Both testified that Doe had never become pregnant by him, that Miller had never been to Doe's apartment, and that he had not given her a smoothie—the drink that allegedly contained the pill. Doe specifically denied that she had ever "lost a pregnancy" as a result of a beverage Miller gave her.

=== Detention in Brazil ===
In September 2021, after participating in a CPAC Brasil Conference, Miller and other American right-wing media personalities in his traveling party were detained and questioned for three hours at the airport in Brasília. The investigation was part of an inquiry by Brazilian Supreme Court Justice Alexandre de Moraes into misinformation allegedly perpetuated by the administration of President Jair Bolsonaro. Miller noted that Brazil was Gettr's second-largest market and called Bolsonaro's supporters "proud patriots". Miller later said that Brazilian officials had not accused him of any wrongdoing. He continued to advise Bolsonaro after his October 2022 election defeat, meeting with the president's son Eduardo Bolsonaro in November as protests and election challenges continued.

=== Testimony before January 6 Committee ===
On February 3, 2022, Miller was deposed. He described a meeting on November 7, 2020, at which he told Trump that the election results were not in his favor:

Miller: I was in the Oval Office. And at some point in the conversation Matt Oczkowski, who was the lead data person, was brought on, and I remember he delivered to the President in pretty blunt terms that he was going to lose [the election].

Committee Staff: And that was based, Mr. Miller, on Matt and the data team’s assessment of this sort of county-by-county, state-by-state results as reported?

Miller: Correct.

Miller said he had told Trump several times that any "election day fraud and irregularities" were insufficient to "overturn the election".

On June 16, 2022, at a public hearing of the House select committee, Miller appeared via a taped deposition. He said that on January 5, 2021, he helped Trump craft a statement in response to a New York Times story that said Vice President Mike Pence disagreed with Trump's claim that Pence had the authority to change the result of the 2020 presidential election. In the statement, Trump claimed that he and Pence were in agreement, while in fact Pence had made clear multiple times that he disagreed strongly with Trump on the issue.

Marc Short, Pence's chief of staff, expressed his displeasure that Miller had allowed such a statement to be released without consulting Pence.

== See also ==
- Timeline of Russian interference in the 2016 United States elections
- Timeline of Russian interference in the 2016 United States elections (July 2016–election day)
- Timeline of post-election transition following Russian interference in the 2016 United States elections
