= Sarah Stewart Taylor =

American mystery author from Vermont

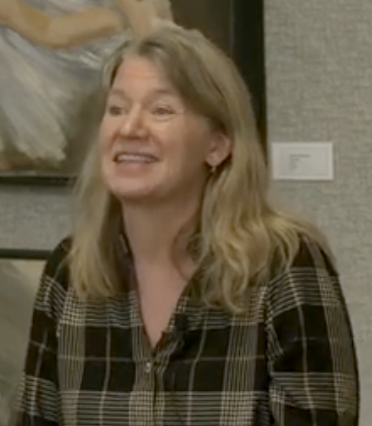
- In a 2022 video for Woodstock Community Television
- Born: 1971 (age 54–55)
- Occupation: Author

Sarah Stewart Taylor (born 1971) is an American author from Vermont.

== Early life and education ==
Taylor was brought up on the North Shore of Long Island; her two parents were public school teachers. She lived in the New Hampshire side of the Upper Valley for two months each summer. She went to Middlebury College as an English literature major with a creative writing concentration. She lived in Ireland "for a few years" and went to graduate school in Dublin. She was a journalist—her writing has appeared in the Washington Post, the New York Times and the Boston Globe—and a writing teacher before moving to writing full time.

== Career ==
Taylor's first series of books was a cozy mystery series set in Vermont and Massachusetts featuring an art historian, Sweeney St. George, who specializes in gravestone and funerary art. Her second series of books set in Dublin and New York follows Detective Maggie D'arcy. Her third series, set in rural Vermont in the 1960s, involves the interplay of Vermont State Police Officer Franklin Warren and amateur detective Alice Bellows. Her latest series is set in the fictional Upper Valley town of Bethany which she describes as "a little bit of Woodstock, a little bit of Hartland, a little bit of Windsor, a little bit of South Royalton and a little bit of Chester." She has also written middle grade novels including a graphic novel about Amelia Earhart illustrated by Ben Towle which was nominated for an Eisner Award.

Taylor has been nominated for an Agatha Award for Best First Novel and for the Dashiell Hammett Prize; her mysteries have appeared on numerous Best of the Year lists. Her novel The Mountains Wild was one of Library Journal's Best Crime Novels of 2020. The fourth Maggie D'arcy mystery, A Stolen Child, was a Publishers Weekly Pick of the Week. She also likes to visit the places she writes about, in order to get a better understanding.

== Personal life ==
Taylor lives in Hartland, Vermont with her husband Matt Dunne where they raise sheep and grow blueberries. They have three children.
