= Gettr =

Social media platform

- Company type: Private
- Website type: Social networking service
- Available in: Multilingual
- Founded: 2021
- Headquarters: New York, U.S.
- Area served: Worldwide
- Owners: GETTR USA, Inc
- Founder: Miles Guo
- Chairperson: Miles Guo
- CEO: Jason Miller (2021–2023); Bing (2023 - Present)
- Industry: Internet
- Website: gettr.com
- Registration: Required
- Users: 175,000 daily (active) as of January 2022
- Launched: July 4, 2021; 5 years ago
- Current status: Online
- Native clients on: iOS, Android, Web

Gettr (stylized GETTR) is an alt-tech social media platform and microblogging site targeting American conservatives. It was founded by Jason Miller, a former Donald Trump aide, and was officially launched on July 4, 2021. Its user interface and feature set have been described as very similar to those of Twitter.

The platform experienced issues shortly after launch, including internet trolls posting content that violated the terms of service, users flooding it with pornography, and the brief hacking of some high-profile accounts. Journalists have observed the prevalence of extreme content on the platform, including racism, antisemitism, and terrorist propaganda.

By November 2021, Gettr said it had almost 3 million total users and almost 400,000 daily average users. As of February 2022, the company said that its number of users had increased to 4.5 million. According to market intelligence company Sensor Tower, as of February 2022 there have been 6.5 million global downloads of the Gettr app from the App Store and Google Play.

== Background ==
After the United States Capitol attack of January 6, 2021, several social media sites banned Donald Trump from their platforms, including Twitter, Facebook, and Instagram. Platforms also suspended some Trump supporters and others who were sharing conspiracy theories and extremist content. These actions led to an outcry from some American conservatives that social media sites and Big Tech were deplatforming or shadow banning them.

After the bans, Trump began to look for alternative outlets, eventually creating his own blog to share similar content to what he had previously posted on Twitter. After poor reception, he closed the blog shortly after its launch. Jason Miller, then Trump's senior advisor and spokesman since 2016, for several months teased plans by the Trump team to create a social network of their own.

== History ==
In June 2021, it was reported that Miller had left Trump's team to become CEO of a tech startup. A beta version of Gettr launched on July 1, 2021, after being added to the Apple App Store and the Google Play Store in mid-June. The platform can also be accessed via the web. Gettr officially launched on July 4, 2021. Miller is CEO, and former Trump campaign spokesman Tim Murtaugh is a media affairs consultant for the company. Miller said of his motivations for creating the site, "People were being de-platformed and realizing that the tech giants, so to speak, had [decided] to ally themselves with the more left-of-centre folks, who want to silence people all over". The term "Gettr" is believed by some critics to be code for "get her".

Gettr is a privately held company. Miller has said the company was financed by a "consortium of international investors" including a foundation tied to Guo Wengui, a Chinese businessman and dissident with connections to former Trump strategist Steve Bannon and Mar-a-Lago. Guo has said he is an adviser to the platform. Media sites tied to Guo have suggested that the platform and its logo were his ideas, though Miller has downplayed the connections. The Daily Beast reported that Gettr was a retooled version of Guo's Chinese internet app, Getome, created by Guo's Chainnov, which Miller confirmed. Getome accounts were wiped before relaunching as Gettr. Miller has said that Guo did not invest money directly and has no official authority within Gettr, but his connection and influence were exposed in March 2023.

On the day of its beta launch, Gettr had several thousand users. There was some initial confusion as to whether the platform was funded by former President Donald Trump. Bloomberg reported that Trump would not be joining the platform, nor would he have any financial stake in it, and that he was still planning to create a platform of his own. On July 4, 2021, the day of the platform's official launch, Miller stated that it had "more than half a million users". According to estimates from Sensor Tower, Gettr received 1.3 million downloads globally between June and July 2021, with the United States and Brazil having the most downloads. In August 2021, it was reported that Trump was considering purchasing equity in the platform, and as of mid-August 2021, Miller said he still aimed to draw Trump to the platform.

The platform was briefly hacked on its launch day. Some high-profile Gettr accounts, including those of Miller, U.S. Representative Marjorie Taylor Greene, former secretary of state Mike Pompeo, and Bannon were compromised and had their account names changed to show the name of the alleged attacker and a message supporting Palestine. A few days later, a hacker was able to scrape almost 90,000 email addresses through their application programming interface (API).

As of November 2021, Gettr had almost 3 million total users and almost 400,000 daily average users.

On December 28, 2021, Gettr laid off its entire security and information technology teams, which included 13 staff members, Gettr's chief information officer (CIO), and Gettr's chief information security officer (CISO). None of these employees were replaced. Three former Gettr employees blamed Guo Wengui for the layoffs.

In January 2022, Gettr gained half a million new users with the joining of Joe Rogan, physician and immunologist Robert Malone, and the Twitter suspension of Congresswoman Marjorie Taylor Greene. On January 3, 2022, Gettr gained 341,000 new users. Rogan announced his Gettr registration on Twitter, and told his 7.8 million followers to join him on the new platform. By January 4, Gettr had more than 540,000 new users since Rogan's registration. Politico reported in July 2021 that Gettr users can import their list of followers from their Twitter account to be displayed as their Gettr followers, which also creates Gettr accounts for those followers.

== Content ==
Content on Gettr is mostly right-wing. Journalists reported extreme content on the platform was prevalent, including racism, antisemitism, and terrorist propaganda. Politico observed the white supremacist Proud Boys organization was being promoted on the platform. Conservative users who have used Gettr include Sean Hannity, Kevin McCarthy, Mike Pompeo, Ben Carson, and Elise Stefanik. The Germany-based far-right disinformation outlet Disclose.tv maintains an account on Gettr.

Trending topics on the platform on the day of Gettr's beta launch included pro-Trump slogans, as well as hashtags including racist and antisemitic slurs and those referring to unevidenced theories about the origins of COVID-19. Shortly after Gettr launched, the platform was inundated with pornography, including hentai. According to the Institute for Strategic Dialogue and Politico in August 2021, propaganda from the Islamic State of Iraq and the Levant (ISIL) had begun to "inundate" the platform, including memes encouraging violence against the Western world, beheading videos, and a meme showing Trump being executed in an orange jumpsuit. The content was similar to what has appeared on mainstream platforms like Facebook and Twitter, according to a director of Tech Against Terrorism, but unlike Gettr the other sites have automatic filtering and removal systems in place, and partner through the nonprofit Global Internet Forum to Counter Terrorism to remove extremist material. In response to questions about the content, Miller said that ISIL was trying to attack Trump supporters because Trump had "wiped [ISIL] off the face of the earth", and that "the only [ISIL] members still alive are keyboard warriors hiding in caves and eating dirt cookies". Also in August, a study published by the Stanford Internet Observatory found that Gettr has "very few—if any—mechanisms for detecting spam, violent content, pornography, and child exploitation imagery" and that "Gettr appears to rely entirely on community reporting mechanisms to find sensitive content and illegal child-related imagery". The study found sixteen examples of images on Gettr that were flagged by PhotoDNA, an image-identification technology used for detecting illegal content, as "child exploitation imagery". Responding to Vice News, Miller labeled the Stanford report "completely wrong", and claimed that Gettr had "a robust and proactive, dual-layered moderation policy using both artificial intelligence and human review, ensuring that our platform remains safe for all users". In an interview with The New York Times at this time, technology columnist Kara Swisher, Miller said that Gettr had applied to work with PhotoDNA. He argued that Gettr uses "pretty tight filters when it comes to images" and that "any image that gets posted and has a child gets reviewed by a human." According to the Associated Press, Gettr "bans racial and religious epithets and violent threats." However, "a quick search turns up a user whose name includes the N-word as well as pro-Nazi content."

Gettr's terms of service say that the platform may remove content that is "offensive, obscene, lewd, lascivious, filthy, pornographic, violent, harassing, threatening, abusive, illegal, or otherwise objectionable or inappropriate". In an appearance on Newsmax, Miller touted the app as a "place people won't be canceled". He described the site's moderation system, which he said had already identified "left-of-center people" and "[caught] them and delete[d] some of that content".

According to Miller in September 2021, Brazil was Gettr's second-largest market after the United States, and said Gettr was being used appreciatively by supporters of Brazilian President Jair Bolsonaro, who himself created an account. In November 2021, Gettr gained nearly 500,000 users in Brazil, or 15 percent of its user base, its second-largest market after the United States. Also according to Miller, Gettr had over 100 moderators as of November 2021, and used artificial intelligence to monitor some content on the platform.

The platform has seen growth in European countries like France, where "political figures, such as Éric Zemmour and Marine Le Pen, have also created their accounts there."

In December 2021, Gettr permanently suspended a 23-year-old far-right commentator, white nationalist and former YouTube personality, Nick Fuentes. The site received backlash from Fuentes' fanbase, known as Groypers, as well as Arizona State Senator Wendy Rogers, who wrote, "What is the point of a free-speech alternative to Twitter ... that doesn't even honor free speech?" Gettr subsequently banned all use of the word "groyper" on the platform. A Gettr spokesperson said "The user in question violated Gettr's clearly defined terms of use and has been suspended from the platform." Fuentes has also lost access from almost every major platform including Facebook, Instagram, Apple's podcast app, TikTok, Discord, Clubhouse, Spotify, and DLive, along with business and consumer services like PayPal, Venmo, Patreon, Airbnb, Shopify, Amazon Web Services, Stripe, Streamlabs and Coinbase.

Shortly after joining Gettr, Joe Rogan expressed confusion on The Tim Dillon Show regarding his supposed 9 million follower tally. Miller claimed the figure, exceeding the total number of Gettr users, was meant to show Rogan's "true reach" via a combined Twitter-Gettr follower tally. Prior to this, both Rogan and Dillon dismissed Rogan's follower total as "fugazi" and "fuckery". Miller provided a statement to Gizmodo and The Daily Beast, stating "[w]e've been in contact with Joe Rogan's team and hope that we have addressed any concerns he may have". Gizmodo noted that since Rogan's comments, Gettr appears to have changed "the way these follower counts are displayed" to provide clearer separation.

=== Chinese government influence operations ===
In September 2023, The Wall Street Journal reported that Gettr was targeted by a Chinese government influence operation called Spamouflage, which aimed to spread disinformation and state propaganda.

=== Use of platform to threaten U.S. officials ===
On July 29, 2024, in response to a subpoena, Gettr provided "approximately 4,359 posts/replies" from a Virginia man targeting public officials including President Joe Biden, Vice President Kamala Harris and FBI Director Christopher Wray. The man was charged with making death threats.

== Platform ==
Gettr has been described as a conservative social media platform. Gettr described itself at launch as a "non-bias social network", and bills itself as an alternative to mainstream social networks, writing in a mission statement that its aims include "fighting cancel culture, promoting common sense, defending free speech, challenging social media monopolies, and creating a true marketplace of ideas". The name is a portmanteau of "getting together", or "get together".

Gettr's user interface and feature set have been described as very similar to those of Twitter, with some journalists describing it as a "clone". Users can write posts on the platform of up to 777 characters in length, upload images, and upload and edit videos that are up to three minutes long. Users can repost other users' posts, as well as explore a feed of trending topics. Some users can import their content from Twitter and mirror their Twitter feeds on Gettr. The platform also includes the ability for users to be verified. The app is rated "M" for "mature" in app stores, meaning it is recommended for those 17 years of age and older. Miller said that the platform plans to add monetization via a "tipping" feature, livestreaming, and a platform to facilitate political donations. Technology journalist Kara Swisher described Gettr in an episode of the podcast Pivot as easy to use and as "a cleaner Twitter", but said "it suffers from a lot of misinformation".

== See also ==
- Alt-tech
- Gab (social network)
- Parler
- Threads
- Twitter
- Truth Social
