= Ted Yoho =

American politician (born 1955)

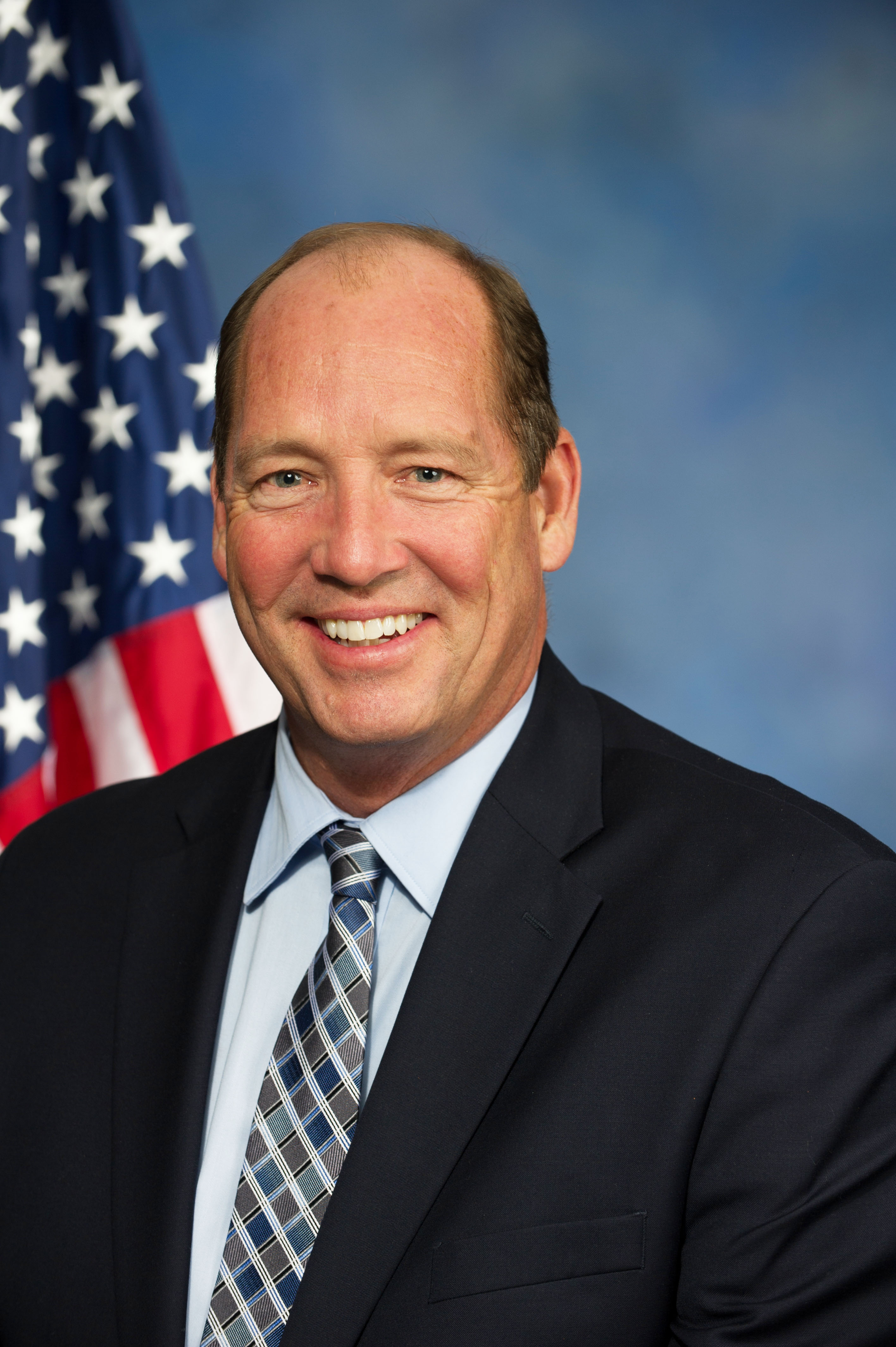
- Official portrait, 2012

Member of the U.S. House of Representatives from Florida's 3rd district
- In office January 3, 2013 – January 3, 2021
- Preceded by: Cliff Stearns
- Succeeded by: Kat Cammack

Personal details
- Born: Theodore Scott Yoho; April 13, 1955 (age 71) Minneapolis, Minnesota, U.S.
- Party: Republican
- Spouse: Carolyn Yoho
- Children: 3
- Education: Broward College (AA); University of Florida (BS, DVM)
- Yoho's voice Yoho on unsung heroes during Black History Month. Recorded February 28, 2017

Theodore Scott Yoho (/ˈjoʊhoʊ/ YOH-hoh; born April 13, 1955) is an American politician, veterinarian, and businessman, who served as the U.S. representative from Florida's 3rd congressional district from 2013 until 2021. He is a member of the Republican Party.

In the 2012 Republican primary election for the district, Yoho pulled a major upset victory against long-term incumbent Congressman Cliff Stearns, who had first been elected in 1988. Before being elected to Congress, Yoho had been a veterinarian and small business owner in North Central Florida for 30 years.

On December 10, 2019, Yoho announced that, honoring his term-limit pledge, he would not run for re-election to Congress in 2020.

== Early life, education, and veterinarian career ==
Yoho was born in Minneapolis, Minnesota, on April 13, 1955. At age 11, he moved with his family to Florida, where he attended school with his future wife, Carolyn, in the 4th grade.

Yoho earned his associate-of-arts degree at Broward Community College. He earned a bachelor's degree in animal science at the University of Florida in 1983 and thereafter attended the University of Florida College of Veterinary Medicine, from which he received a doctorate in veterinary medicine. He is a member of the American Veterinary Medical Association, the Florida Veterinary Medical Association, the Florida Association of Equine Practitioners, the Florida Cattlemen's Association, and the National Rifle Association of America.

== U.S. House of Representatives ==
=== 2012 election ===
Yoho ran for the newly redrawn Florida's 3rd congressional district. In the Republican primary, he defeated longtime incumbent Cliff Stearns, first elected in 1988; State Senator Steve Oelrich; and James Jett, the Clay County clerk of court—34%–33%–19%–14%. Yoho defeated Stearns by 829 votes, a margin of 1.1 percentage points. Yoho won 11 of the district's 13 counties.

Yoho won the November general election, 65% to 32%, against Democratic candidate J.R. Gaillot.

=== Tenure ===
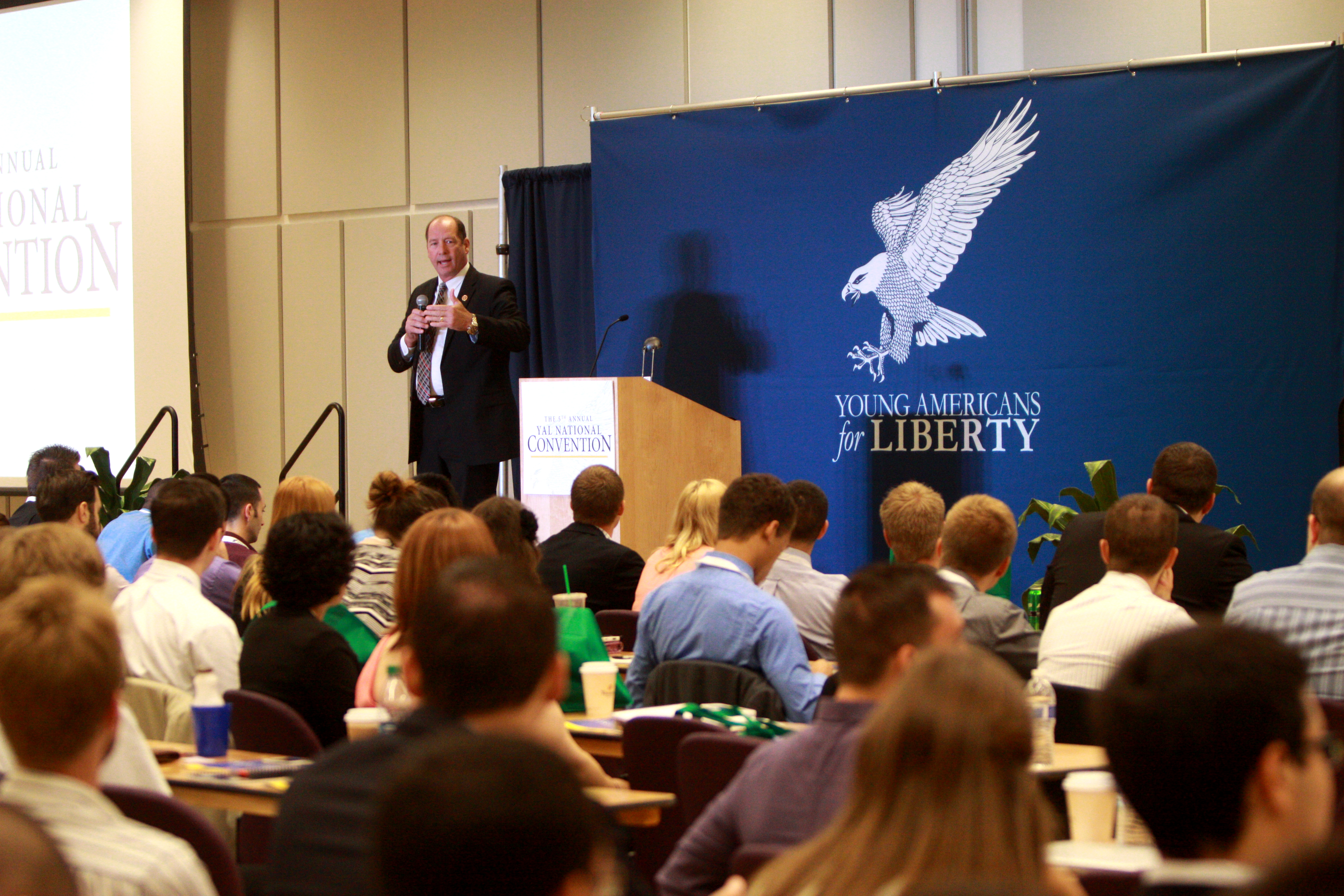
Congressman Ted Yoho speaking at the 2013 Young Americans for Liberty National Convention

Yoho took office on January 3, 2013. He is a member of the Tea Party Caucus and the House Liberty Caucus. He says that he supports reduction in taxes: replacing the current tax code with the Fair Tax (a broad national consumption tax on retail sales), reducing corporate tax rates, and eliminating federal programs that cannot be balanced with revenues. According to the CBO, there would still be a deficit even if all discretionary spending (all Federal programs except pensions, Medicare and Social Security) were stopped. Yoho advocates reducing spending and taxes, though has not yet introduced a plan that will lead to a balanced budget.

Yoho also is opposed to raising the debt ceiling unless significant spending cuts are made; he is also opposed to earmarks in legislation. His district is one of the lowest-taxed in Florida, located primarily within Suwannee River Management District (lower proportion of property taxes), per capita retail sales in the district are significantly lower than the state average, and it has the fewest non-farm related businesses of Florida's congressional districts. Yoho has not made any indication on his level support of the farm bill.

In 2014, Yoho was challenged by conservative Republican Jake Rush for his seat. Rush painted Yoho as a "liberal" and appealed to voters' conservatism to try to win the Republican nomination.

In 2015, Yoho mounted a campaign to challenge John Boehner for the Speakership of the US House of Representatives in an attempt to get the conference to the second ballot. The bloc of dissenting members were four votes shy of achieving their goal.

He and his Democratic colleague John Conyers offered bipartisan amendments to block the U.S. military training of Ukraine's Azov Battalion of the Ukrainian National Guard. Some members of the battalion were openly white supremacists.

In November 2024, Yoho briefly considered running in the 2025 Florida's 6th congressional district special election, as his residence lies within the boundaries of the new 6th district.

=== Controversies ===
While running for Congress in 2012, Yoho supported Florida Governor Rick Scott's controversial reduction of early voting while backing further reductions. Yoho later joked about limiting the right to vote once again exclusively to property owners. He also expressed support for the Bilderberg conspiracy theory.

In 2013, he became widely known for stating that breaching the debt ceiling and defaulting on the national debt "would bring stability to the world markets". This position was widely panned by Democrats as well as some of his fellow Republicans, such as Representative Reid Ribble, who called the position "crazy talk".

==== Verbal assault ====
In July 2020, Yoho accosted Congresswoman Alexandria Ocasio-Cortez over her public comments that an increase of crime in New York City was due to the high rise in poverty. According to a reporter from The Hill who overheard the conversation, the congressman called her "disgusting" and "out of your freaking mind". Ocasio-Cortez called him "rude", and reporters overheard Yoho calling her a "fucking bitch" as he walked away from the conversation. Ocasio-Cortez confirmed the incident on Twitter and on the House floor, but Yoho's office denied his comments, claiming that he "made a brief comment to himself as he walked away summarizing what he believes her policies to be: bullshit". He later addressed the incident on the House floor, saying, "Having been married for 45 years with two daughters, I'm very cognizant of my language. The offensive name calling, words attributed to me by the press were never spoken to my colleagues and if they were construed that way, I apologize for their misunderstanding". Though later in an interview with comedian Ben Palmer he confessed, "truth is, as I walked away by myself, I said what an F'in B". (Note: Palmer trolled Yoho into setting up a podcast as a satirical prank using a parody of Parler that actually had a disclaimer at the bottom of the homepage. This ruse continued for three months before Yoho caught on. During this time, Palmer caught Yoho in the aforementioned lie on the congressional floor, managed to get Michele Bachmann on the podcast, and made many controversial comments. Palmer and his crew used a contract drafted by lawyers for Sacha Baron Cohen to protect themselves legally.)

Ocasio-Cortez addressed Congress and rebuked Yoho for having called her "a fucking bitch". In response, Ocasio-Cortez said, "Having a daughter does not make a man decent. Having a wife does not make a decent man. Treating people with dignity and respect makes a decent man". On July 25, 2020, Bread for the World, a Christian non-profit organization, announced Yoho would no longer serve on its board, noting that Yoho's "recent actions and words as reported in the media are not reflective of the ethical standards expected of members of our Board of Directors".

=== Legislation ===
During his first term of office, Yoho sponsored eighteen bills. One of the bills introduced during his first term, the Preventing Executive Overreach on Immigration Act of 2014, was passed by the House, but never voted on by the Senate.

Yoho co-authored the Veterinary Medicine Mobility Act of 2014 (H.R. 1528; 113th Congress), a bill that would amend the Controlled Substances Act to clarify that veterinarians are not required to have separate registrations to dispense controlled substances outside of their principal place of business, such as when treating animals on a farm.

Yoho is a co-sponsor of the Defund Planned Parenthood Act of 2015 (H.R. 3134). It has not moved since passing the House on September 18, 2015.

On June 9, 2016, Yoho voted Nay on the Puerto Rico Oversight, Management, and Economic Stability Act (PROMESA, H.R. 5278) to restructure Puerto Rican debt. The Republican-authored bill passed the House with bipartisan support.

=== Committee assignments ===
- Committee on Agriculture
  - Subcommittee on Horticulture, Research, Biotechnology, and Foreign Agriculture
  - Subcommittee on Livestock, Rural Development, and Credit
  - Subcommittee on Nutrition
- Committee on Foreign Affairs
  - Subcommittee on Asia and the Pacific
- Republican Study Committee

=== Caucus memberships ===
- United States Congressional International Conservation Caucus
- Freedom Caucus
- Veterinary Medicine Caucus

== Political positions ==
=== Gun policy ===
Yoho has stated that "the right to bear arms is a birthright and should never be threatened". Yoho is a gun owner. He supports concealed carry laws and carries his gun with him when at home in Florida. Yoho has compared carrying a gun to carrying a cell phone in one's pocket. He says "I have the right to protect myself", regarding concealed carry and "I feel like I have a very good aim. My wife is better". He has co-sponsored bills to allow lawmakers to carry guns at the US Capitol and additional bills to allow individuals to carry guns nationwide, regardless of state law. In 2012, Yoho stated, "I am proud to say I hold an A rating from the NRA". In 2015 and 2016, Yoho accepted US$1,000 in direct campaign contributions from the National Rifle Association's Political Victory Fund; from 2012 to 2018, his total is US$4,000 from NRA sources.

In March 2017, Yoho voted in favor of the Veterans Second Amendment Protection Act, which would have allowed veterans who are considered "mentally incompetent" to purchase ammunition and firearms unless declared a danger by a judge. The measure passed the House of Representatives, but ultimately stalled in the Senate. Yoho was one of the original co-sponsors of H.J.Res.40, which successfully used the Congressional Review Act to block implementation of an Obama-era amendment to the NICS Improvement Amendments Act of 2007 that was aimed at preventing the mentally-infirm from legally purchasing firearms.

=== LGBT rights ===
Yoho has a "0" rating from the Human Rights Campaign, indicating an anti-LGBT voting history.

=== Abortion ===
Yoho is pro-life. He believes there should be strict protection laws for fetuses. He has described abortion as a "hideous practice" which "needs to stop".

=== Foreign policy ===
Yoho urged the Trump administration to impose sanctions against Chinese officials who are responsible for human rights abuses against the Uyghur Muslim minority in China's northwestern Xinjiang region. In March 2019, Yoho and other lawmakers wrote a letter to Secretary of State Mike Pompeo that read in part, "This issue is bigger than just China. It is about demonstrating to strongmen globally that the world will hold them accountable for their actions". He also delivered a speech on East Turkistan (Xinjiang) on the House floor, describing East Turkistan as an "occupied country" and condemned China for what he says is its genocide of Uyghurs, Kazakhs, Kyrgyz, and other Turkic peoples.

=== Drug policy ===
Yoho voted in favor of blocking the Drug Enforcement Administration (DEA) from using funds to shut down medical marijuana operations in states where such operations are legal.

=== Economic issues ===
Yoho voted in favor of the Tax Cuts and Jobs Act of 2017. Yoho acknowledges that the bill is "not perfect". He believes the bill will "simplify the tax code" and "lighten the burden on all Americans (including middle-class families)".

=== Lynching ===
On February 26, 2020, Yoho voted against making lynching a federal hate crime. He stated that he believed it was an "overreach of the federal government and tramples on states' rights to make their own legislation on the subject".

=== Texas v. Pennsylvania ===
In December 2020, Yoho was one of 126 Republican members of the House of Representatives who signed an amicus brief in support of Texas v. Pennsylvania, an unsuccessful lawsuit filed at the United States Supreme Court contesting the results of the 2020 presidential election, in which Joe Biden prevailed over incumbent Donald Trump.

== Personal life ==
Before his political career, he practiced veterinary medicine for 30 years after graduating from the University of Florida in 1983. Ted married his high school sweetheart, Carolyn, on February 14, 1975, when they were both 19 years old.

=== Awards and honors ===
Country	Date	Appointment	Ribbon	Notes
Japan	December 8, 2020	Order of the Rising Sun 3rd Class		Bestowed by Emperor Naruhito
Mongolia	April 13, 2021	Order of the Polar Star		

U.S. House of Representatives
Preceded by Corrine Brown	Member of the U.S. House of Representatives from Florida's 3rd congressional district 2013–2021	Succeeded by Kat Cammack
U.S. order of precedence (ceremonial)
Preceded by Dennis Ross as Former U.S. Representative	Order of precedence of the United States as Former U.S. Representative	Succeeded by Matt Gaetz as Former U.S. Representative
