= 2016 Vermont gubernatorial election =

- November 8, 2016
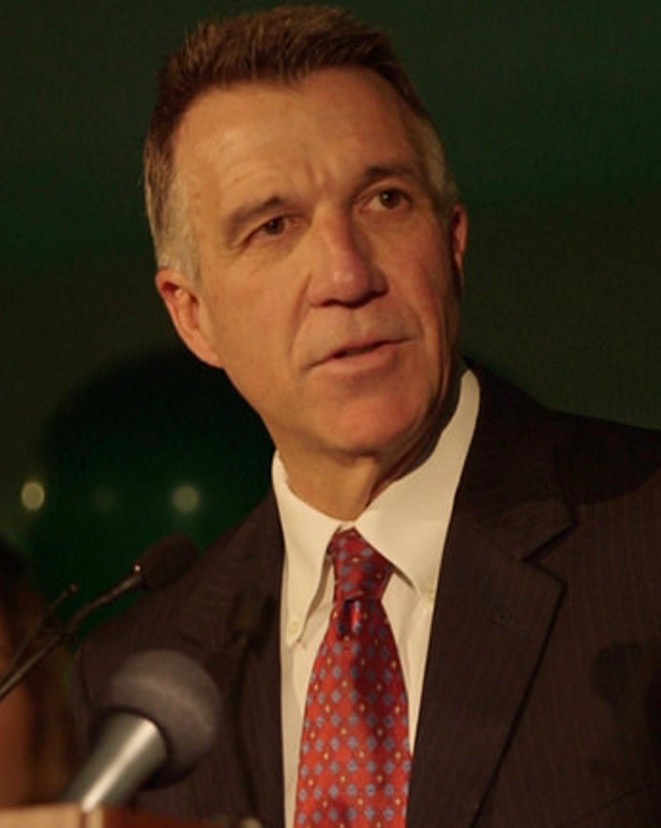

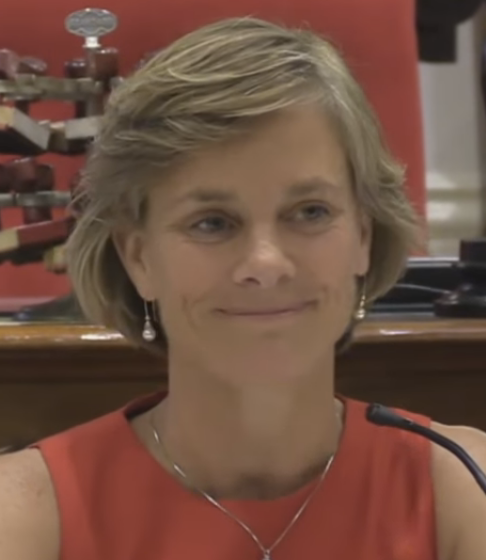
Nominee	Phil Scott	Sue Minter
Party	Republican	Democratic
Popular vote	166,817	139,253
Percentage	52.90%	44.17%
- Scott: 40–50% 50–60% 60–70% 70–80% 80–90% Minter: 40–50% 50–60% 60–70% 70–80% Tie: 40–50%
Governor before election
Peter Shumlin
Democratic
Elected Governor
Phil Scott
Republican

The 2016 Vermont gubernatorial election took place on November 8, 2016, and elected the governor of Vermont, concurrently with the 2016 U.S. presidential election, elections to the United States Senate in other states, elections to the United States House of Representatives, and various state and local elections.

Incumbent Democratic governor Peter Shumlin was eligible to run for re-election to a fourth term in office, but opted to retire instead.

The primaries were held on August 9. Former Vermont Agency of Transportation Secretary Sue Minter won the Democratic nomination, and Lieutenant Governor Phil Scott won the Republican primary, with Scott defeating Minter in the general election. This was the first gubernatorial election in Vermont in which the winner was of a different party than the incumbent president since 1992.

== Background ==
Two-term Democratic governor Peter Shumlin ran for re-election in 2014 and was widely expected to win easily. However, he only took a plurality of the vote, 46.36%, to Republican Scott Milne's 45.1%, and thus the result was decided by the Vermont General Assembly. The Assembly picked Shumlin by 110 votes to 69. Shumlin announced in June 2015 that he would not run for a fourth term.

Vermont and New Hampshire are the only states in the country whose governors are elected every two years.

== Democratic primary ==
In August, Vermont House Speaker Shap Smith announced that he would be a candidate, but ended his candidacy in November 2015, after his wife was diagnosed with breast cancer. In September, Matt Dunne announced that he would also be a candidate. Also in September, former state legislator Sue Minter, then serving as Vermont's Secretary of Transportation, announced that she would resign her position in order to join the Democratic race. Former ambassador Peter Galbraith announced his candidacy in March 2016.

In July, H. Brook Paige was excluded from official Democratic Party events after making derogatory comments on social media.

Minter won the nomination decisively, and was endorsed by Dunne but not Galbraith.

=== Candidates ===
==== Declared ====
- Matt Dunne, former state senator, Google executive, and candidate for governor in 2010
- Cris Ericson, perennial candidate (also running for the U.S. Senate)
- Peter W. Galbraith, former state senator and former United States Ambassador to Croatia
- Sue Minter, former secretary of the Vermont Agency of Transportation and former state representative
- H. Brooke Paige, former CEO of Remington News Service, candidate for governor and attorney general in 2014 and Republican candidate for the U.S. Senate in 2012 (also ran for attorney general)

==== Withdrawn ====
- Shap Smith, Speaker of the Vermont House of Representatives (running for lieutenant governor)

==== Declined ====
- T.J. Donovan, Chittenden County state's attorney and candidate for Vermont Attorney General in 2012 (running for Vermont attorney general)
- Deborah Markowitz, secretary of the Vermont Agency of Natural Resources, former secretary of state of Vermont and candidate for governor in 2010
- Doug Racine, former secretary of the Vermont Agency of Human Services, former lieutenant governor, nominee for governor in 2002 and candidate for governor in 2010
- Peter Shumlin, incumbent governor
- Peter Welch, U.S. representative and nominee for governor in 1990

=== Endorsements ===
Matt Dunne

Individuals
Current legislators

- Tom Ayres, (D), Burlington City Council member
- John Bartholomew, representative from Hartland
- Philip Baruth, Senate Majority Leader from Chittenden County
- Steve Berry, representative from Manchester
- Tim Briglin, representative from Thetford
- Robin Chestnut-Tangerman, representative from Middletown Springs
- Kevin "Coach" Christie, representative from Hartford
- Alison Clarkson, representative from Woodstock
- Selene Colburn (P), Burlington City Council member
- Dan Connor, representative from Fairfield
- Susan Hatch Davis, representative from Washington
- Bill Frank, representative from Underhill
- Sara Giannoni (P), Burlington City Council member
- Jane Knodell (P), Burlington City Council President
- Gabrielle Lucke, representative from White River Junction
- Chip Mason (D), Burlington City Council member
- Dick McCormack, senator from Windsor County
- Mark McDonald, senator from Orange County
- Barbara Rachelson, representative from Burlington
- Adam Roof (I), Burlington City Council member
- Donna Sweaney, representative from Windsor
- Max Tracy (P), Burlington City Council member
- Tommy Walz, representative from Barre
- Sam Young, representative from Glover
- Teo Zagar, representative from Barnard

Former legislators

- Judith Stephany Ahearn, senator from Chittenden County
- Sandy Baird, representative from Burlington
- Joyce Barbieri, representative from Wallingford
- Chuck Bohi, representative from Hartford
- Gordon Bristol, representative from Brattleboro
- Carol Buchdahl, representative from Georgia
- Jack Candon, representative from Norwich
- Mary Ann Carlson, senator from Bennington County
- Diane Carmolli, representative from Rutland City
- Matt Choate, senator from Caledonia County
- Andrew Christiansen, representative from East Montpelier
- Wendell Coleman, representative from Londonderry
- Don Collins, senator from Franklin County
- Michel Consejo, representative from Swanton
- Thomas Costello, representative from Brattleboro
- Barbara Grimes, representative from Burlington
- Christopher Healy, representative from Norwich
- Steve Hingtgen, representative from Burlington
- Cheryl Hooker, representative from Rutland City
- Margaret Hummel, representative from Underhill
- Michael Klopchin, representative from Clarendon
- Alysia Krasnow Butler, representative from Charlotte
- Jerry Kreitzer, representative from Rutland City
- Doris Lingelbach, representative from Thetford
- Mary Mazzariello, representative from Rutland City
- Hinda Miller, senator from Chittenden County
- Anne Mook, representative from Bennington
- Donny Osman, representative from Plainfield
- Mary-Ann Parizo, representative from Essex
- Dexter Randall, representative from Newport
- Cheryl Rivers, senator from Windsor County
- Ann Seibert, representative from Norwich
- Ernest Shand, representative from Weathersfield
- Andrew Snyder, representative from Pittsford
- Bob Stannard, representative from Manchester
- Sheila Vowinkel, representative from Hartford
- Perry Waite, representative from Pawlett
- Linda Waite-Simpson, representative from Essex
- Cindy Weed, representative from Enosburg
- Jeff Young, representative from St. Albans

Organizations

- Rights and Democracy, progressive activist group
- Vermont Labor Council AFL–CIO
- Vermont State Employees' Association

Newspapers

- Burlington Free Press
Sue Minter

Individuals

- Chris Bray (D), state senator and Senate Natural Resources Committee Chairman
- Howard Dean (D), former governor of Vermont
- Philip H. Hoff (D), former governor of Vermont
- Madeleine Kunin (D), former governor of Vermont, former lieutenant governor of Vermont, and former United States Ambassador to Switzerland and Liechtenstein
- Jason Lorber (D), former Chittenden state representative
- Bill McKibben, climate activist (originally supported Dunne)
- Doug Racine (D), former secretary of the Vermont Agency of Human Services, former lieutenant governor, nominee for governor in 2002 and candidate for governor in 2010
- Mary Sullivan (D), Chittenden state representative

Organizations

- EMILY's List
- Vermont Conservation Voters

Newspapers

- The Manchester Journal

=== Polling ===
Poll source	Date(s) administered	Sample size	Margin of error	Matt Dunne	Sue Minter	Peter Galbraith	Other/Undecided
Energy Independent Vermont	June 26–29, 2016	217	± 6.7%	31%	36%	8%	25%
Castleton Polling Institute	February 3–17, 2016	895	± 3.27%	19%	11%	–	69%

=== Results ===
Democratic primary results
Party	Candidate	Votes	%
Democratic	Sue Minter	35,979	51.20%
Democratic	Matt Dunne	26,699	38.00%
Democratic	Peter Galbraith	6,616	9.40%
Democratic	Cris Ericson	538	0.80%
Democratic	H. Brooke Paige	387	0.60%
Democratic	Write-ins	579	1.84%
Total votes		70,798	100.00%

== Republican primary ==
In September 2015, Lieutenant Governor Phil Scott entered the race, and 2014 gubernatorial nominee Scott Milne, who had been considering running, endorsed Scott. In October 2015, retired Wall Street executive Bruce Lisman officially announced his "outsider" candidacy.

Scott was endorsed by most active Vermont Republican politicians, and held a strong lead in a February poll. Lisman's campaign criticized Scott for being too closely connected to outgoing Democratic governor Peter Shumlin and for "plagiarizing" Lisman's ideas, and linked Scott to the "failures" of the Vermont Health Connect insurance platform and the school redistricting Act 46; the candidates' campaigns disagreed over whether this constituted "negative campaigning," and Scott's campaign said the attacks were "patently false".

Scott won the nomination by a large margin.

=== Candidates ===
==== Declared ====
- Bruce Lisman, retired Wall Street executive
- Phil Scott, lieutenant governor

==== Declined ====
- Randy Brock, former state senator, former Vermont Auditor of Accounts and nominee for governor in 2012 (running for lieutenant governor)

=== Endorsements ===
Phil Scott

Vermont state officials

- Randy Brock, former Vermont state auditor and state senator (R-Franklin), and candidate for lieutenant governor
- Jim Douglas, former governor of Vermont

Vermont state senators

- Joe Benning, Vermont Senate minority leader (R-Caledonia)
- Brian Collamore, Vermont Senate assistant minority leader (R-Rutland)
- John Crowley, former Vermont state senator (R-Rutland)
- Judy Bloomer Crowley, former Vermont state senator (R-Rutland)
- Dustin Allard Degree, Vermont state senator (R-Franklin)
- William T. Doyle, Vermont state senator (R-Washington)
- Margaret Flory, Vermont state senator (R-Rutland)
- Jim Greenwood, former Vermont state senator (R-Essex/Orleans)
- Hull Maynard, former Vermont state senator (R-Rutland)
- Dick Mazza, state senator (D-Grand Isle)
- Kevin Mullin, Vermont state senator (R-Rutland)
- Helen Riehle, Vermont state senator (R-Chittenden)
- Richard Westman, Vermont state senator (R-Lamoille)

Vermont state representatives

- Steve Adams, former Vermont state representative (R-Hartland)
- Robert Bancroft, Vermont state representative (R-Westford)
- Fred Baser, Vermont state representative (R-Bristol)
- Lynn Batchelor, Vermont state representative (R-Derby Line)
- Scott Beck, Vermont state representative (R-St. Johnsbury)
- Steven Beyor, Vermont state representative (R-Highgate Springs)
- David Bolduc, former Vermont state representative (R-Barton)
- Donald Bostic, former Vermont state representative (R-St. Johnsbury)
- Carolyn Branagan, Vermont state representative (R-Georgia)
- Patrick Brennan, Vermont state representative (R-Colchester)
- David Brown, former Vermont state representative (R-Walden)
- Thomas Burditt, Vermont state representative (R-West Rutland)
- William Canfield, Vermont state representative (R-Fair Haven)
- Howard Crawford, former Vermont state representative (R-St. Johnsbury)
- Lawrence Cupoli, Vermont state representative (R-Rutland City)
- Dennis Devereux, Vermont state representative (R-Belmont)
- Eileen Dickinson, Vermont state representative (R-St. Albans)
- Anne Donahue, Vermont state representative (R-Northfield)
- Joyce Errecart, former Vermont state representative (R-St. Shelburne)
- Peter Fagan, Vermont state representative (R-Rutland City)
- Martha Feltus, Vermont state representative (R-Lyndonville)
- Larry Fiske, Vermont state representative (R-Enosburg Falls)
- John Follett, former Vermont state representative (R-Springfield)
- Walt Freed, former speaker of the Vermont House of Representatives (R-Dorset)
- Marianna Gamache, Vermont state representative (R-Swanton)
- Rodney Graham, Vermont state representative (R-Williamstown)
- Michael Hebert, Vermont state representative (R-Vernon)
- Robert Helm, Vermont state representative (R-Fair Haven)
- Mark Higley, Vermont state representative (R-Lowell)
- Connie Houston, former Vermont state representative (R-Ferrisburgh)
- Adam Howard, former Vermont state representative (R-St. Cambridge)
- Ronald Hubert, Vermont state representative (R-Milton)
- Bernard Juskiewicz, Vermont state representative (R-Cambridge)
- Duncan Kilmartin, former Vermont state representative (R-Newport)
- Tom Koch, former Vermont state representative (R-Barre Town)
- Patti Komline, Vermont state representative (R-Dorset)
- Robert LaClair, Vermont state representative (R-Barre Town)
- Cathy Lamberton, former Vermont state representative (R-St. Morristown)
- Richard Lawrence, Vermont state representative (R-Lyndonville)
- Paul Lefebvre, Vermont state representative (R-Island Pond)
- Patti Lewis, Vermont state representative (R-Berlin)
- Robert Lewis Jr., former Vermont state representative (R-Derby)
- Judy Livingston, former Vermont state representative (R-Manchester)
- Michael Marcotte, Vermont state representative (R-Newport)
- Richard "Dick" Marron, former Vermont state representative (R-Stowe)
- Marcia Martel, Vermont state representative (R-Waterford)
- Frank Mazur, former Vermont state representative (R-St. South Burlington)
- Patricia McCoy, Vermont state representative (R-Orleans)
- Francis McFaun, Vermont state representative (R-Barre Town)
- John Morley III, former Vermont state representative (R-Newport)
- Linda Myers, Vermont state representative (R-Essex Junction)
- Allen Palmer, former Vermont state representative (R-Pownal)
- Corey Parent, Vermont state representative (R-St. Albans)
- Albert Pearce, Vermont state representative (R-Richford)
- Janice Peaslee, former Vermont state representative (R-St. Guildhall)
- Joey Purvis, Vermont state representative (R-Colchester)
- Constance Quimby, Vermont state representative (R-Concord)
- Gary Reis, former Vermont state representative (R-St. Johnsbury)
- Carl Rosenquist, former Vermont state representative (R-St. Georgia)
- Brian K. Savage, Vermont House assistant minority leader (R-Swanton)
- Heidi Scheuermann, Vermont state representative (R-Stowe)
- Butch Shaw, Vermont state representative (R-Florence)
- Loren Shaw, Vermont state representative (R-Derby)
- Harvey Smith, Vermont state representative (R-New Haven)
- Vicki Strong, Vermont state representative (R-Irasburg)
- Thomas Terenzini, Vermont state representative (R-Rutland Town)
- Warren Van Wyck, Vermont state representative (R-Ferrisburgh)
- Gary Viens, Vermont state representative (R-Newport)
- Scott Wheeler, former Vermont state representative (R-Newport)
- Janssenn Willhoit, Vermont state representative (R-St. Johnsbury)
- Kurt Wright, Vermont state representative (R-Burlington)
- Mark Young, former Vermont state representative (R-Orwell)

Organizations

- Vermont Police Association
- Vermont Realtors Association
- Vermont Sheriffs' Association
- Vermont Troopers Association
- Vermont Vehicle and Automotive Distributors Association

Vermont businesspeople

- Scott Milne, businessman and Republican nominee for governor in 2014

Newspapers

- The Addison Independent
- The Burlington Free Press
- The Manchester Journal
- The Stowe Reporter

Vermont Republican Party officials

- Jackie Barnett, former VT GOP secretary
- Jim Barnett, former VT GOP chair
- Suzanne Butterfield, former Windsor County GOP chair
- Paul T. Carroccio, former VT GOP chair
- Mary Daly, Orange County GOP chair
- Josh Fitzhugh, Washington County GOP chair
- John Kascenska, Caledonia County GOP chair
- Steve Larabee, former VT GOP chair and former Vermont state representative (R-Danville)
- Brent Smith, Groton Town GOP chair

Vermont Republican candidates

- Buddy Barnett, former candidate for the Vermont State Senate
- Mike Doyle, candidate for the Vermont State Senate
- Riki French, candidate for the Vermont House of Representatives
- Jason Gibbs, former Republican nominee for Vermont Secretary of State
- Bruce Melendy, candidate for the Vermont House of Representatives
- Gary Nolan, candidate for the Vermont House of Representatives
- Kate Purcell, former candidate for the Vermont State Senate
- Craig Vance, candidate for the Vermont House of Representatives
Bruce Lisman

Individuals

- Milt Eaton (R), former secretary of the Vermont Development and Community Affairs, former Department of Energy foreign attache
- Patty O'Donnell, former Vermont state representative (R-Windham-1)
- Job Tate, Vermont state representative (R-Rutland-Windsor)

Businesspeople

- Steve Forbes, businessman and candidate for Republican presidential nominee in 1996 and 2000

On May 6, 2016, Scott received the endorsements of all Vermont Republican legislators (listed above) except state representatives Donald Turner, Doug Gage, Mary Morrissey, Job Tate, and Paul Dame. Among those five legislators who did not endorse Scott, four said they always remain neutral in a party primary election, and one was waiting until after the filing deadline to make an endorsement.

=== Polling ===
Poll source	Date(s) administered	Sample size	Margin of error	Phil Scott	Bruce Lisman	Other/Undecided
Energy Independent Vermont	June 26–29, 2016	171	± 7.5%	68%	23%	9%
Castleton Polling Institute	February 3–17, 2016	895	± 3.27%	42%	4%	53%

=== Results ===
Republican primary results
Party	Candidate	Votes	%
Republican	Phil Scott	27,669	60.50%
Republican	Bruce Lisman	18,055	39.50%
Republican	Write-ins	48	0.22%
Total votes		45,772	100.00%

== Liberty Union primary ==
=== Candidates ===
==== Declared ====
- Bill "Spaceman" Lee, former Major League Baseball pitcher and Rhinoceros Party presidential candidate in 1988

=== Results ===
Liberty Union primary results
Party	Candidate	Votes	%
Liberty Union	Bill "Spaceman" Lee	6	100.00%
Total votes		6	100%

== General election ==
=== Debates ===
- Complete video of debate, October 6, 2016 - C-SPAN

=== Predictions ===
Source	Ranking	As of
The Cook Political Report	Tossup	August 12, 2016
Daily Kos	Tossup	November 8, 2016
Rothenberg Political Report	Tilt R (flip)	November 3, 2016
Sabato's Crystal Ball	Lean R (flip)	November 7, 2016
Real Clear Politics	Tossup	November 1, 2016
Governing	Tossup	October 27, 2016

=== Polling ===
Poll source	Date(s) administered	Sample size	Margin of error	Sue Minter (D)	Phil Scott (R)	Bill Lee (LU)	Undecided
SurveyMonkey	November 1–7, 2016	454	± 4.6%	51%	47%	—	2%
SurveyMonkey	October 31–November 6, 2016	447	± 4.6%	50%	48%	—	2%
SurveyMonkey	October 28–November 3, 2016	449	± 4.6%	46%	51%	—	3%
SurveyMonkey	October 27–November 2, 2016	424	± 4.6%	44%	53%	—	3%
SurveyMonkey	October 26–November 1, 2016	428	± 4.6%	43%	54%	—	3%
SurveyMonkey	October 25–31, 2016	436	± 4.6%	45%	52%	—	3%
RRH Elections	October 24–26, 2016	1,052	± 3.0%	38%	45%	4%	13%
Braun Research/WCAX	October 19–22, 2016	603	± 4.0%	40%	47%	6%	9%
Castleton University - Vermont Public Radio	September 29–October 14, 2016	579	± 3.9%	38%	39%	7%	14%

=== Results ===
2016 Vermont gubernatorial election
Party	Candidate	Votes	%	±%
Republican	Phil Scott	166,817	52.90%	+7.80%
Democratic	Sue Minter	139,253	44.17%	−2.19%
Liberty Union	Bill Lee	8,912	2.83%	+1.96%
Write-in		313	0.10%	-0.27%
Total votes		315,295	100.00%	N/A
Republican gain from Democratic				

==== By county ====
By county

County	Phil Scott Republican		Sue Minter Democratic		Various candidates Other parties	
County	#	%	#	%	#	%
Addison	10,101	52.77%	8,576	44.81%	463	2.41%
Bennington	8,551	49.37%	8,140	47.0%	629	3.63%
Caledonia	9,221	64.93%	4,494	31.65%	486	3.42%
Chittenden	38,277	45.99%	42,993	51.66%	1,953	2.35%
Essex	2,056	70.73%	736	25.32%	115	3.96%
Franklin	14,512	67.43%	6,425	29.85%	585	2.72%
Grand Isle	2,615	63.16%	1,422	34.35%	103	2.49%
Lamoille	7,222	56.55%	5,242	41.05%	306	2.39%
Orange	8,459	57.39%	5,901	40.03%	380	2.57%
Orleans	8,291	68.7%	3,299	27.34%	478	3.96%
Rutland	18,443	62.32%	10,155	34.31%	996	3.37%
Washington	16,977	54.04%	13,756	43.79%	683	2.17%
Windham	8,084	36.08%	13,372	59.68%	950	4.24%
Windsor	14,008	46.93%	14,742	49.39%	1,098	3.68%
Totals	166,817	52.91%	139,253	44.17%	9,225	2.93%

Counties that flipped from Democratic to Republican

- Addison (largest municipality: Middlebury)
- Bennington (largest municipality: Bennington)
