= Matt Dunne =

American politician and businessman

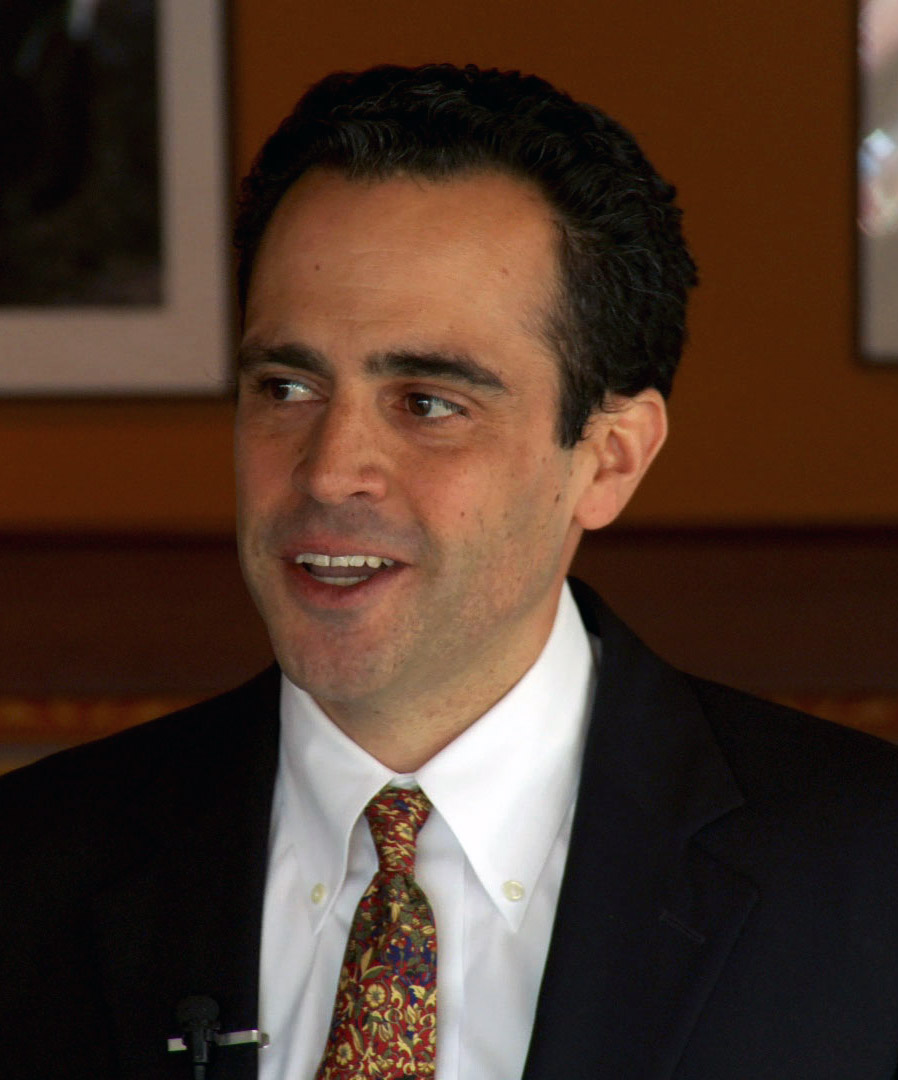

Member of the Vermont Senate from the Windsor district
- In office 2002–2006

Member of the Vermont House of Representatives
- In office 1992–1998

Personal details
- Born: November 20, 1969 (age 56) New Haven, Connecticut, US
- Party: Democratic
- Education: Brown University

Matt Dunne (born November 20, 1969) is an American politician and businessman from the U.S. state of Vermont. He served four terms in the Vermont House of Representatives, two terms in the Vermont State Senate, was the Democratic candidate in the 2006 Vermont Lt. Governor's race, and the fourth-place finisher in the Democratic primary during the Vermont gubernatorial election, 2010.

Dunne was a candidate for the 2016 Democratic nomination for Governor of Vermont.

== Early life ==
Dunne was born in New Haven, Connecticut. He grew up in Hartland, Vermont, the son of lawyer and civil rights activist John Bailey Dunne and college professor Faith Weinstein Dunne. Dunne attended Hanover High School in Hanover, New Hampshire, graduating in 1987. He then spent a year at Choate Rosemary Hall, a boarding school in Wallingford, Connecticut. After graduating from Choate in 1988, Dunne attended Brown University, where he graduated with a Bachelor of Arts in public policy in 1992.

== Business career ==
Dunne was Director of Marketing for Logic Associates, a Vermont software company that during his tenure grew to over $18 million in sales. He also co-founded Cabin Fever Productions, which managed the Briggs Opera House and facilitated concerts in downtown White River Junction. Following the 2006 election, Dunne was hired by Google to run community affairs for the company from White River Junction, Vermont.

== Politics ==
=== Career ===
At age 22, Dunne was elected to the Vermont House of Representatives representing Hartland and West Windsor in 1992. He served four terms in the Vermont House, during which he served as Vice-Chair of the Transportation Committee. In 1998 he became the youngest House majority whip in the country. After serving in the legislature for 7 years, President Clinton asked Dunne to serve as Director of AmeriCorps VISTA, an organization that oversees over 6,000 full-time volunteers in the fight against poverty. As director, Dunne improved recruitment numbers and overhauled the organization's training programs. He served as director for two and a half years, under both President Clinton and President Bush.

After returning to Vermont in 2002, Dunne was elected to the Vermont State Senate, representing Windsor. He served on the Appropriations, Economic Development, and Administrative Rules Committees. During this time he served as Assistant Director of the Nelson A. Rockefeller Center for Public Policy at Dartmouth College, where he oversaw programs to prepare young people for careers in public service and non-profit management, including the Policy Research Shop. He also served as Chair of the Vermont delegation to the New England Board of Higher Education.

==== 2006 campaign for lieutenant governor ====
In 2006, Dunne ran for Lieutenant Governor of Vermont. In the Democratic primary held September 14, 2006, Dunne defeated State Rep. John Tracy of Burlington, winning 59% of the vote.

Dunne faced off against incumbent Republican Brian Dubie. Dunne's campaign received attention for its service politics events, where campaign volunteers worked with Vermont communities on local service projects. Dunne lost to Dubie 45%–51%.

==== 2010 gubernatorial election ====
On November 3, 2009, Dunne announced that he would seek the Democratic nomination for Governor of Vermont in 2010. Dunne was one of five Democrats vying for the nomination.

During the final weeks of the campaign, Dunne's brother Josh suffered a life-threatening stroke that required surgery. Dunne missed three of the final debates, and removed himself from the campaign trail for nearly two weeks, finally returning on August 20.

The primary was held on August 24, 2010. Dunne finished fourth with 20.8% of vote. He finished ahead of Susan Bartlett (5.1%), but behind Peter Shumlin (24.8%), Doug Racine (24.6%), and Deborah Markowitz (23.9%). Only 4 percentage points separated the top four candidates, making it one of the closest primaries in Vermont history. Shumlin went on to win the general election, and all his primary opponents but Dunne subsequently joined the Shumlin administration.

==== 2016 election for governor ====
Dunne announced his candidacy in September 2015. In February 2016 Dunne left his position at Google, indicating to members of the media that he did so to focus on his campaign.

Dunne received the endorsements of two major Vermont labor groups, the Vermont State Employees Association and the Vermont branch of the AFL-CIO, and the progressive Vermont activist group Rights and Democracy. In July, he received the endorsement of six dozen current and former Vermont legislators, including that of Senate Majority Leader Philip Baruth, who had said earlier he was not planning to endorse any candidate. He was also endorsed by the Burlington Free Press, which praised his clearly articulated plans for Vermont's economy and government.

Dunne finished second in the August 9 primaries, and endorsed the winner, Sue Minter.

===== Positions =====
Dunne emphasized ethics, transparency, and campaign finance reform in his campaign, with a plan to require greater disclosure of campaign assets, close the revolving door between regulators and industry in Montpelier, improve Vermont's public campaign financing, and eliminate direct corporate contributions to campaigns. His campaign voluntarily released more campaign finance reports than required by state law, and unsuccessfully called on Dunne's opponents to do the same.

Dunne supported increasing the minimum wage to $15 per hour and investing in microfinancing; providing universal primary health care; divesting from fossil fuels and investing $100 million in efficiency, solar, and heat pump technology; improving women's equality through paid family leave, affordable state-run child care, free access to long-term birth control, and improving job training opportunities for women in the STEM fields; improving enforcement of racial and LGBTQA anti-discrimination laws; emphasizing treatment over law enforcement in addressing Vermont's opioid abuse epidemic; and legalizing and regulating marijuana. He supported universal background checks for gun sales in Vermont, but unlike his rivals has not called for a ban on assault weapons.

Climate activist Bill McKibben endorsed Dunne early in the race, but later switched his support to Dunne's rival Sue Minter after Dunne released a statement on wind power advocating more local control over projects, a position McKibben considered a dog whistle to opponents of wind expansion. Environmental group Vermont Conservation Voters, which had been neutral in the race, endorsed Minter for the same reason. Dunne's campaign manager responded that Minter had not clearly articulated her position on ridgeline wind, saying "Matt made a decision to be clear and is being attacked for it."

== Personal life ==
Dunne lives in Hartland, Vermont with his wife Sarah Stewart Taylor where they raise sheep and chickens and grow blueberries. They have three children, Judson, Abraham, and Cora.

Party political offices
| Preceded by Cheryl Pratt Rivers | Democratic nominee for Lieutenant Governor of Vermont; 2006 | Succeeded by Thomas W. Costello |
