= Bruce Lisman =

Wall Street executive (b. 1947)

Personal details
- Born: July 1947 (age 79) Burlington, Vermont, U.S.
- Party: Republican
- Education: University of Vermont

Bruce Lisman (born July 1947) is a retired Wall Street executive and was a Republican candidate for Vermont Governor in 2016.

== Financial career ==
Lisman was born in Burlington, Vermont and attended the University of Vermont. He moved to New York City and entered the financial sector after graduating in 1969. Early in his career he was an analyst covering banking companies, and later Director of Global Research at Lehman Brothers. He became a Senior Research Managing Director at Bear Stearns Companies in 1984, and rose to Co-Head of Global Equities at Bear Stearns in 2006. In the 2000s, he also held positions at JPMorgan, JPMorgan Chase, and National Life Group. He continues to serve on a range of executive boards around Vermont.

Lisman has stated that his responsibilities as a Bear Stearns executive were not connected to the financial meltdown that led to the failure and bailout of the company during the 2008 financial crisis.

== Politics ==
In 2011, Lisman founded Campaign for Vermont, a campaign group "advocating for a more prosperous state." The group is officially nonpartisan, and advocates limiting state budget growth and reforming education funding, and criticized Governor Peter Shumlin's plans for single-payer healthcare. Lisman donated at least $26,000 to the Vermont Republican Party between 2010 and 2014 but none, according to records, to the Vermont Democratic Party; this led to complaints that the group was violating campaign finance law by promoting a Republican agenda, with one such complaint dismissed by Democratic then-Attorney General Bill Sorrell in 2012. Lisman, who put over $1 million of his own money into the campaign, repeatedly denied holding any of his own political ambitions, and insisted that Campaign for Vermont was nonpartisan.

In October 2015, Lisman announced his "outsider" candidacy for Vermont governor as a Republican. His platform included a two-year moratorium on new industrial renewable energy projects; repealing the recently passed Act 46, which he said would lead to "mandatory consolidation of our schools"; replacing Vermont Health Connect with a federal health care exchange; and capping state budget growth at 2 percent for three years. Lisman repeatedly declined to say whether or not he supports presumptive Republican Presidential nominee Donald Trump, unlike his rival, Lieutenant Governor Phil Scott, who does not support Trump.

Lisman's campaign attacked Scott for being too closely connected to outgoing Democratic governor Peter Shumlin and for "plagiarizing" Lisman's ideas, and linked Scott to what it called the "failures" of the Vermont Health Connect insurance platform and the school redistricting Act 46. Such attacks are unusual in Vermont politics. Similar ads were aired by a Super PAC funded by some of Lisman's former Bear Stearns colleagues.

Scott won the election by over 20 percentage points.
