= Dean Corps =

Democracy for America program

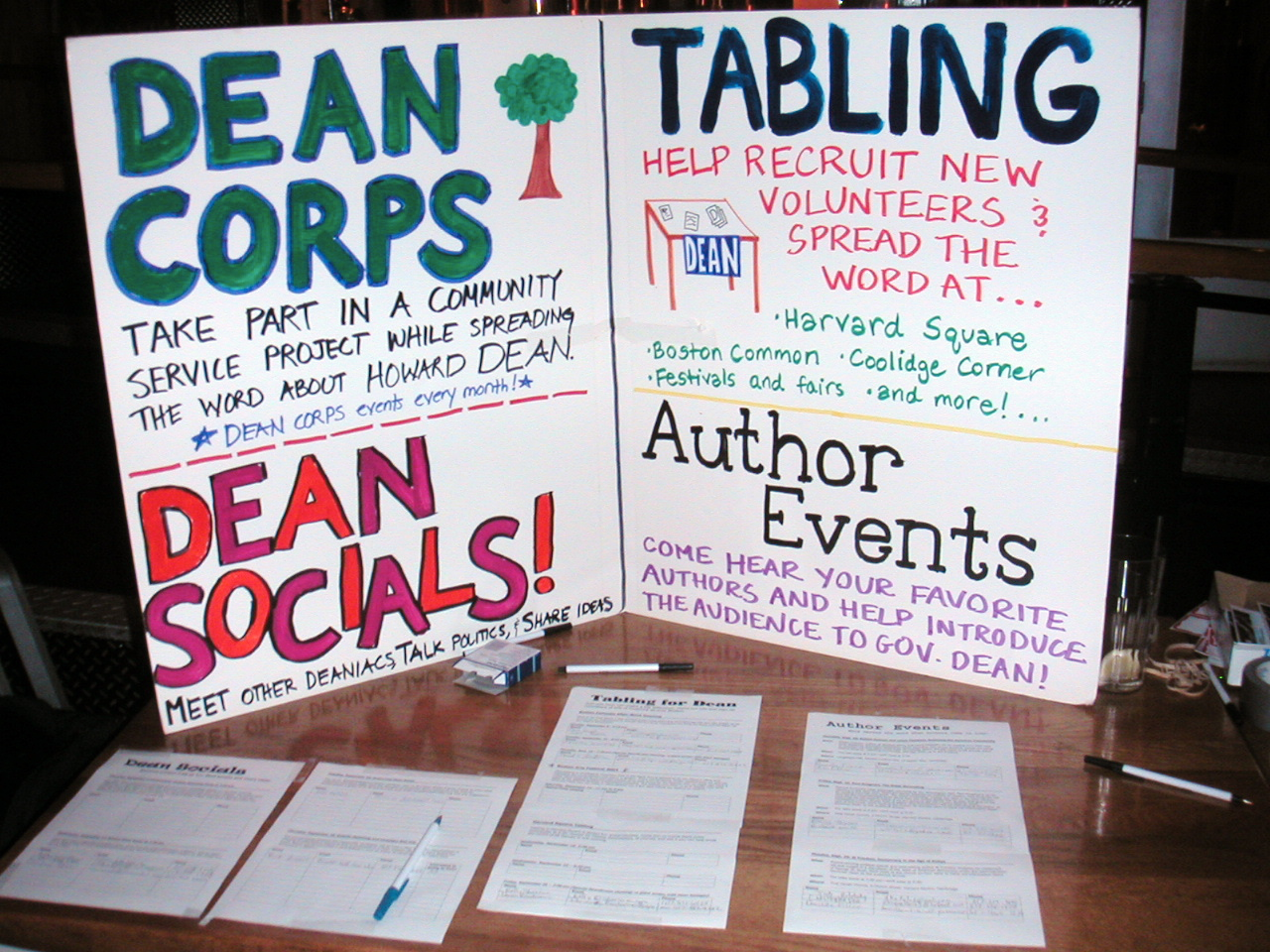

Dean Corps is a program run by Democracy for America to further its goal of electing progressive Democrats at all levels of office in all 50 states. It is similar to Russ Feingold's Progressive Patriot program.

== Current status ==
Piloting in 2010, Dean Corps will consist of hiring, training and placing field organizers on key progressive campaigns. The organizers will be operating in state and federal races and working directly under the auspices of the host campaign. DFA is committed to supporting progressive Democrats who have backbone with money, media, time, and people. Dean Corps provides the people part of that equation.

Unlike previous programs bearing similar names, the current version of Dean Corps bears the name of Democracy for America's Chair Jim Dean, brother of former Vermont Governor Howard Dean.

== History of the Name ==
An unrelated but similar program, Dean Corps (which later became DFA Corps), was once the name for a grassroots project started by Howard Dean supporters.

Howard Dean wrote: "Dean Corps is based on AmeriCorps. Members devote their time, energy, and labor to community service. Dean Corps began in Iowa, intending to fill the vacuum left by the Bush administration’s underfunding of AmeriCorps, which hit Iowa particularly hard. Dean Corps has been active in the unemployed community in Iowa, and it is also doing environmental outreach and developing programs to help ensure that the needs of seniors are met." DFA Corps was organized by bloggers, performed a variety of community service projects, and was generally well received by the public.

== See also ==
- Democracy for America
- Howard Dean
- Dean Corps at DFA's website
