= Killing of Charles Dean and Neil Sharman =

Murder victims

Charlie Dean

Neil Sharman

Charles Dean and Neil Sharman were American and Australian citizens, respectively, travelling through Southeast Asia on a backpacking trip in 1974 when they were kidnapped and killed by Communist guerillas. Charles "Charlie" Dean (aged 24) was the brother of future U.S. politician and Democratic National Committee Chairman Howard Dean, Democracy for America Chairman Jim Dean, and political activist Bill Dean. Neil Sharman (aged 23), was a journalist taking time off from his career to see the world. The two were captured and killed by the Communist Pathet Lao guerrillas.

On 14 November 2003, Dean's remains were repatriated to the United States, and Sharman's were repatriated to Australia.

== Charles Dean ==
Dean grew up in Manhattan and worked summers as a volunteer counselor with Boys Harbor. Dean graduated from the University of North Carolina at Chapel Hill where he was active in student government and the anti-war movement in 1972. In 1972, he went on to work as the Orange County, North Carolina coordinator for Democrat George S. McGovern's 1972 presidential campaign.

In 1973 Dean travelled to Japan by freighter, then to Australia where he worked on a sheep station for 9 months. While there he met Australian journalist Neil Sharman. In 1974, the two travelled to Laos to visit a friend of the Dean family who worked for USAID.

Together with Sharman, Dean stayed in a bungalow on the Mekong River, planning to meet another friend who was serving in the Peace Corps in Nepal. In early September 1974, Dean and Sharman took a raft down the Mekong River to Thailand. They were stopped at a checkpoint near a small village called Pak Him Boun, two miles southeast of the capital of Laos, Vientiane, by Pathet Lao communist guerrillas who imprisoned the two, apparently believing they were spies because they were carrying cameras.

Dean's parents traveled to Laos where they met with Premier Souvanna Phouma and Prime Minister Prince Souphanouvong in May 1975 in an effort to obtain the release of Dean and Sharman. The U.S. government demanded the release of both Dean and Sharman. Dean was classified as a POW-MIA although he was a civilian, leading to speculation that he was working for the Central Intelligence Agency. According to Howard Dean, his parents believed this to be true, though Howard Dean does not. The CIA says it has no records that Charles Dean was ever in their employ.

A memorial service was held for Dean at St. Luke's Episcopal Church in East Hampton, New York, in the year following his presumed death.

== Neil Sharman ==
Neil Sharman, who had previously worked as a journalist for the Sydney Morning Herald, was working for the Northern Territory News when he wrote to tell his brother in 1973 that he was taking a backpack and heading off to see "Indonesia, Malaysia, India and all places in between. Maybe the Arab countries (If we can without being shot)." Sharman's girlfriend, Joy Hooper, who had been travelling with the two men, searched desperately for information on the two, questioning government officials across the region for several months before returning home to Australia.

== Execution ==
Although not widely known at the time, Dean and Sharman were executed by the Pathet Lao on or about 14 December 1974. In 2000, accounts given by people who had seen the two young men killed enabled the identification of the site where Dean and Sharman were believed to have been buried. Examination of the remains after their 2003 recovery showed that the two young men had been handcuffed and shot.

== Repatriation of remains ==
On 11 November 2003 Howard Dean confirmed that a joint Laotian-US task force had discovered remains thought to be those of his younger brother, and DNA analysis subsequently confirmed that the remains were Charles's. In May 2004, Charles's remains were buried, with his three brothers and his mother in attendance. Charles's death has been widely reported by Howard Dean as having had a major influence on his life; on most days, he wears a black leather belt that once belonged to Charles.
