= Doug Racine =

American politician

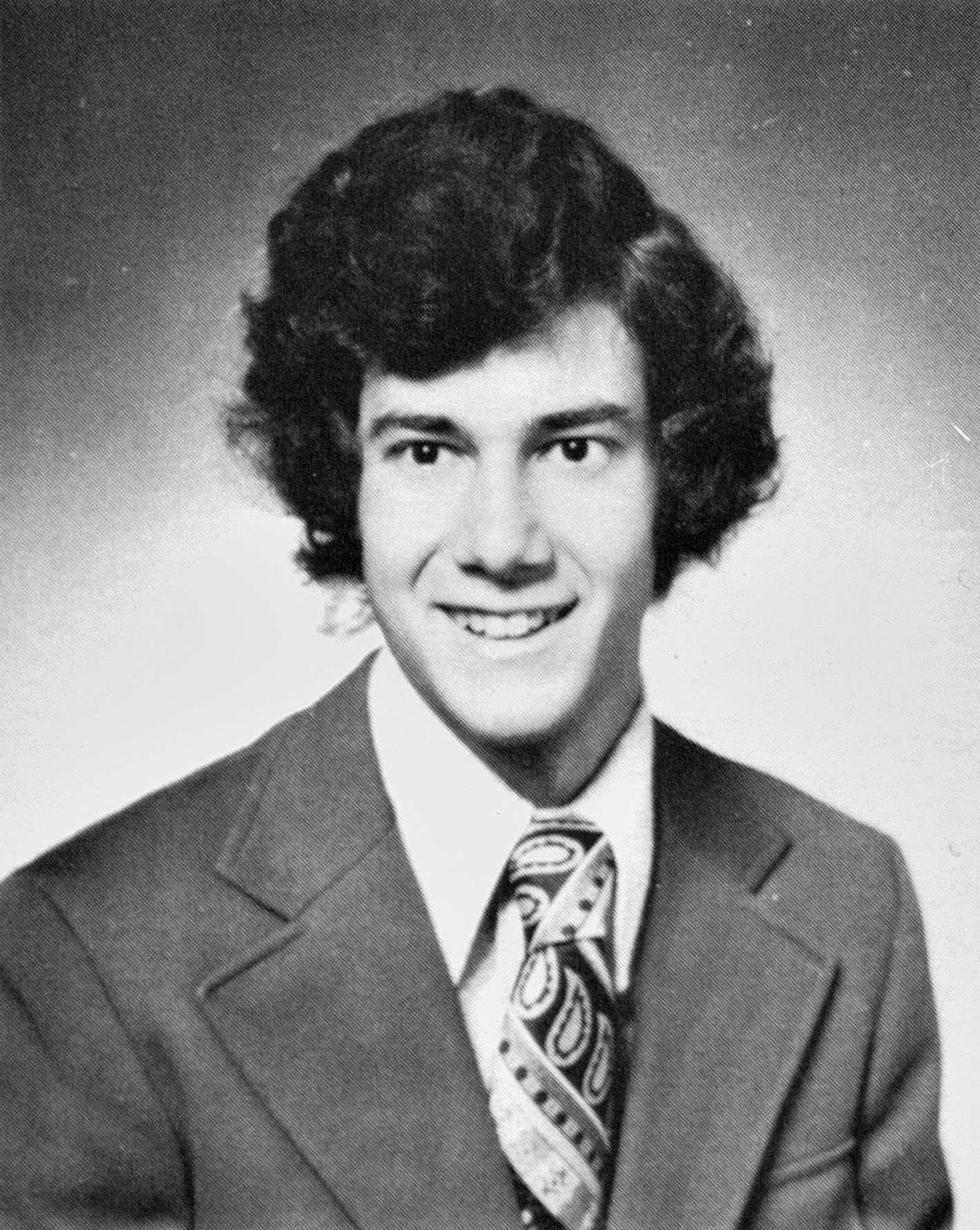
- Racine's Princeton University yearbook photo, 1974

79th Lieutenant Governor of Vermont
- In office January 9, 1997 – January 8, 2003
- Governor: Howard Dean
- Preceded by: Barbara Snelling
- Succeeded by: Brian Dubie

Personal details
- Born: October 7, 1952 (age 74) Burlington, Vermont, U.S.
- Party: Democratic
- Education: Princeton University (BA)

Douglas Alan Racine (born October 7, 1952) is an American politician and former Vermont Secretary of Human Services, a former Vermont State Senator, and the 79th lieutenant governor of Vermont from 1997 to 2003. He is a Democrat. Racine was a candidate for the 2010 Democratic nomination for Governor of Vermont. He previously ran for governor in 2002 but lost to Republican Jim Douglas. In an election where no candidate won a majority, Douglas won a 45% plurality, and Racine declined to contest the outcome before the Vermont General Assembly.

== Biography ==
Douglas Alan Racine was born on October 7, 1952, in Burlington, Vermont. He graduated from Burlington High School in 1970. In 1974, Racine graduated from Princeton University with a Bachelor of Arts in politics after completing his senior thesis, "Changes in Interplay Competition in Vermont." Racine worked as a legislative assistant for Senator Patrick Leahy. He has long been involved in his family's business, the Willie Racine's, Inc. Jeep dealership founded by his father, of which he has served as vice president.

Racine served 5 terms in the Vermont Senate (1983–93). He was Chairman of the Senate Natural Resources and Energy Committee and President Pro Tem of the Senate (1989–93). He was elected Lieutenant Governor in 1996 and served three terms (1997–2003) with Governor Howard Dean.

He was the Democratic nominee for governor in 2002, but lost to Republican Jim Douglas. Because no candidate won a majority, the Vermont General Assembly had to decide. The General Assembly almost always votes for the candidate who received a plurality. Racine did not contest the results, and the legislature chose Douglas.

In 2006, Racine was again elected to the Vermont Senate, representing the Chittenden Senate District. He was re-elected in 2008.

Racine ran for the 2010 Democratic nomination for Governor of Vermont. In the 5-way Democratic primary on August 24, 2010, Racine placed second with 18,079 votes (24.22%) to first-place winner Peter Shumlin's 18,276 votes (24.48%). Racine requested a recount, which reaffirmed Shumlin's nomination. Shumlin then defeated Republican Lieutenant Governor Brian Dubie in the November 2, 2010 general election.

On November 30, 2010, Gov.-elect Shumlin nominated Racine to be his Secretary of Human Services. On August 12, 2014, Governor Shumlin announced the departure of Racine from the same post.

Political offices
Preceded by Peter Welch	President pro tempore of the Vermont Senate; 1989–1993	Succeeded by John Bloomer
Preceded by Barbara Snelling	Lieutenant Governor of Vermont; 1997–2003	Succeeded by Brian Dubie
Party political offices
Preceded by David S. Wolk	Democratic nominee for Lieutenant Governor of Vermont; 1994, 1996, 1998, 2000	Succeeded by Peter Shumlin
Preceded by Howard Dean	Democratic nominee for Governor of Vermont; 2002	Succeeded by Peter Clavelle
