= Howard Dean =

American politician (born 1948)

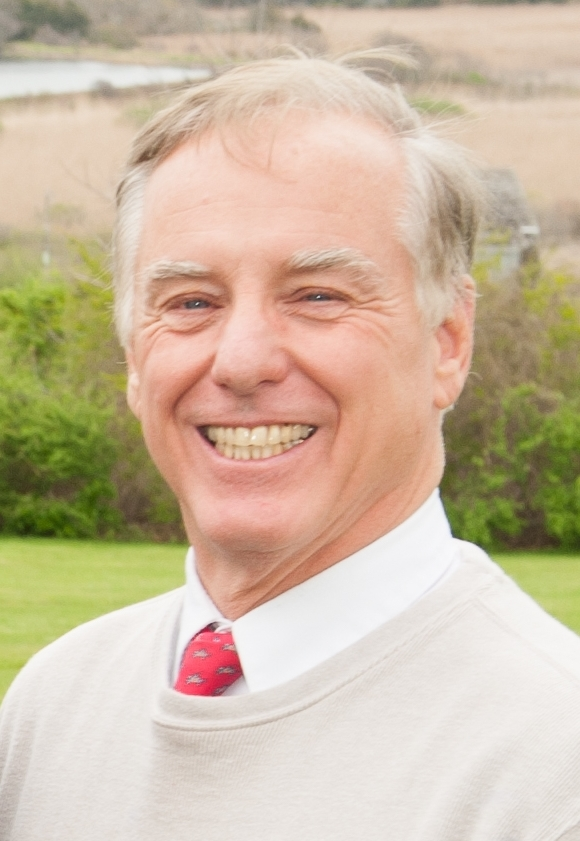
- Dean in 2016

Chair of the Democratic National Committee
- In office February 12, 2005 – January 21, 2009
- Preceded by: Terry McAuliffe
- Succeeded by: Tim Kaine

79th Governor of Vermont
- In office August 13, 1991 – January 9, 2003
- Lieutenant: Barbara Snelling; Doug Racine
- Preceded by: Richard Snelling
- Succeeded by: Jim Douglas

Chair of the National Governors Association
- In office July 19, 1994 – August 1, 1995
- Preceded by: Carroll A. Campbell Jr.
- Succeeded by: Tommy Thompson

77th Lieutenant Governor of Vermont
- In office January 8, 1987 – August 13, 1991
- Governor: Madeleine Kunin; Richard Snelling
- Preceded by: Peter Smith
- Succeeded by: Barbara Snelling

Member of the Vermont House of Representatives from the Chittenden 7-4 district
- In office January 5, 1983 – January 7, 1987
- Preceded by: Constituency established
- Succeeded by: Bennett Truman

Personal details
- Born: Howard Brush Dean III; November 17, 1948 (age 78) East Hampton, New York, U.S.
- Party: Democratic
- Spouse: Judith Steinberg (m. 1981)
- Children: 2
- Education: Yale University (BA); Yeshiva University (MD)

Howard Brush Dean III (born November 17, 1948) is an American physician and retired politician who served as the 79th governor of Vermont from 1991 to 2003 and chair of the Democratic National Committee (DNC) from 2005 to 2009. Dean was an unsuccessful candidate for the Democratic nomination in the 2004 presidential election. Afterward, he became a political commentator and consultant to McKenna Long & Aldridge, a law and lobbying firm.

Before entering politics, Dean earned his medical degree from the Albert Einstein College of Medicine in 1978. Dean served as a member of the Vermont House of Representatives from 1983 to 1986 and as the 77th lieutenant governor of Vermont from 1987 to 1991. Both were part-time positions that enabled him to continue practicing medicine. In 1991, Dean became governor of Vermont, subsequently winning five two-year terms and serving until 2003. (Note: Thomas Chittenden served as governor before statehood from 1778 to 1789 and 1790 to 1791; after statehood, he served from 1791 to 1797.) Dean also oversaw the expansion of the "Dr. Dynasaur" program, which ensures universal health care for children and pregnant women in the state.

Dean denounced the 2003 invasion of Iraq and called on Democrats to oppose the George W. Bush Administration. In the 2004 Democratic presidential primaries, Dean finished third in the Iowa caucus, and his campaign suffered after negative reactions in the media to a hoarse shout that he gave during a speech; Dean ended up losing the nomination to Senator John Kerry of Massachusetts. He was later elected chairman of the Democratic National Committee in February 2005. As chairman of the party, Dean created and employed the fifty-state strategy that attempted to make Democrats competitive in normally conservative states often dismissed in the past as "solid red".

Dean was named chairman emeritus of the DNC upon his retirement in January 2009. Since retiring from the DNC chairman position, Dean has held neither elected office nor an official position in the Democratic Party and, as of 2015, was working for global law firm Dentons as part of the firm's public policy and regulation practice. In 2013, Dean expressed interest in running for the presidency in 2016, but instead supported former Secretary of State Hillary Clinton's run for president.

== Early life and education ==
=== Childhood ===
Dean was born in East Hampton, New York, to Andrée Belden (née Maitland), an art appraiser, and Howard Brush Dean Jr., an executive in the financial industry. Dean is the eldest of four brothers, including Jim Dean, Chair of Democracy for America, and Charles Dean, who was captured by the Pathet Lao and executed by the North Vietnamese while traveling through Southeast Asia in 1974.

Howard's father worked at the stock brokerage firm of Dean Witter. The family was quite wealthy, Republican, and belonged to the exclusive Maidstone Golf Club and Devon Yacht Club in East Hampton. As a child, he spent much of his time growing up in East Hampton; the family built a house on Hook Pond there in the mid-1950s. While in New York, the family had a three-bedroom apartment on the Upper East Side along Park Avenue.

Howard attended the Browning School in Manhattan until he was 13, and then went to St. George's School, a preparatory school in Middletown, Rhode Island. In September 1966, he attended Felsted School, UK, for one school year after winning an English Speaking Union scholarship.

UPI quoted one of Dean's friends in his youth as saying, "By Hamptons standards, the Deans were not rich. No safaris in Africa or chalets in Switzerland. Howard's father went to work every day. He didn't own a company, or have a father or grandfather who founded one, as mine did." Peggy Noonan wrote in the Wall Street Journal that:

he doesn't seem like a WASP. I know it's not nice to deal in stereotypes, but there seems very little Thurston Howell, III, or George Bush, the elder, for that matter, in Mr. Dean. ... He seems unpolished, doesn't hide his aggression, is proudly pugnacious. He doesn't look or act the part of the WASP ... It will be harder for Republicans to tag Mr. Dean as Son of the Maidstone Club than it was for Democrats to tag Bush One as Heir to Greenwich Country Day. He just doesn't act the part.

=== Yale University ===
Dean graduated from Yale University with a Bachelor of Arts in political science in 1971. As a freshman, he specifically asked to room with an African American. The university housing office complied, and Dean roomed with two Southern black students and one white student from Pennsylvania. One of Dean's roommates was Ralph Dawson, the son of a sheet metal worker in Charleston, South Carolina, and today a New York City labor lawyer. Dawson said of Dean:

Unless you operated from a stereotypic understanding of the Yale white boy as rich, you wouldn't know that about Howard. ... When it came to race—and I don't know whether this was a function of intent or just came naturally—Howard was not patronizing in any way. He was willing to confront in discussion what a lot of white students weren't. He would hold his ground. He would respect that I knew forty-two million times more about being black than he did. But that didn't mean he couldn't hold a view on something relating to civil rights that would be as valid as mine. There were lots of well-meaning people at Yale who wanted you to understand that they understood your plight; you'd get into a conversation and they would yield too soon, so we didn't get the full benefit of the exchange. Howard very much thought he was capable of working an issue through. He was inquisitive. And when he came to a conclusion he would be as strong as anybody else. I don't think he's stubborn. He's a guy who's always been comfortable in his own skin. That's something you still see in him today, and it gets him into some degree of controversy.

Though eventually eligible to be drafted into the military, he received a medical deferment because of an unfused vertebra. In response to Tim Russert asking on Meet the Press whether Dean could have served in the military had he not mentioned his back condition during his draft physical, Dean replied "I guess that's probably true. I mean, I was in no hurry to get into the military." He briefly tried a career as a stockbroker before deciding on a career in medicine, completing pre-medicine classes at Columbia University. In 1974, Dean's younger brother Charlie, who had been traveling through southeast Asia at the time, was captured and killed by Laotian guerrillas, a tragedy widely reported to have an enormous influence in Dean's life; for many years he has worn his brother's belt nearly every day as a memento.

=== Vermont medical practice ===
Dean received his Doctor of Medicine degree from the Yeshiva University Albert Einstein College of Medicine in 1978 and began a medical residency at the University of Vermont.

== Vermont political career ==
In 1980, Dean spearheaded a grassroots campaign to stop a condominium development on Lake Champlain, instead favoring the construction of a bicycle trail. The effort succeeded and helped launch his political career. That same year, he was also a volunteer for Jimmy Carter's re-election campaign. In 1980, he was a Carter delegate at the Democratic National Convention. In 1981 he was elected chairman of the Chittenden County Democratic Committee. He served in this position until resigning in May 1984.

In 1982, he was elected to the Vermont House of Representatives; he was reelected in 1984 and became assistant minority leader. He was elected lieutenant governor in 1986 and reelected in 1988 and 1990. All were part-time positions, and Dean continued to practice medicine alongside his wife until he became governor.

On August 13, 1991, Dean was examining a patient when he received word that governor Richard A. Snelling had died of sudden cardiac arrest. Dean assumed the office, which he called the "greatest job in Vermont." He was subsequently elected to five two-year terms in his own right, making him the longest-serving governor in the state's history. From 1994 to 1995, Dean was the chairman of the National Governors Association.

Dean was faced with an economic recession and a $60 million budget deficit. He bucked many in his own party to immediately push for a balanced budget, an act which marked the beginning of a record of fiscal restraint. During his tenure as governor, the state paid off much of its debt, balanced its budget eleven times, raised its bond rating, and lowered income taxes twice. Robert Dreyfuss wrote that as a fiscal conservative:

Dean navigated a triangular course between the two parties, clashing often with the Democrats over taxes and spending -- and helping to drive many liberal-left Democrats into the arms of the Progressive Party and of Representative Bernie Sanders, Congress's lone socialist. Inheriting a fiscal crisis from Snelling, Dean slashed the budget and dramatically reduced taxes. During the 1990s, Dean repeatedly unsheathed his veto pen, and he often allied with a growing contingent of conservative Blue Dog Democrats and Republicans to outmaneuver the Democratic leadership on issues such as taxes.

Dean also focused on health care issues, most notably through the "Dr. Dynasaur" program, which ensures near-universal health coverage for children and pregnant women in the state; the uninsured rate in Vermont fell from 10.8 percent in 1993 to 8.4 percent in 2000 under his watch. Child abuse and teen pregnancy rates were cut roughly in half.

The first decision of his career to draw significant national attention came in 2000, after the Vermont Supreme Court, in Baker v. State, ruled that the state's marriage laws unconstitutionally excluded same-sex couples and ordered that the state legislature either allow gays and lesbians to marry or create a parallel status. Facing calls to amend the state constitution to prohibit either option, Dean chose to support the latter one, and signed the nation's first civil unions legislation into law, spurring a short-lived "Take Back Vermont" movement which helped Republicans gain control of the State House.

Dean was criticized during his 2004 presidential campaign for another decision related to civil unions. Shortly before leaving office, he had some of his Vermont papers sealed for at least the next decade, a time frame longer than most outgoing governors use, stating that he was protecting the privacy of many gay supporters who sent him personal letters about the issue. On the campaign trail, he demanded that Vice President Dick Cheney release his energy committee papers. Many people, including Democratic Senator and failed 2004 presidential candidate Joe Lieberman of Connecticut, who would go on to leave the party after losing his primary for re-election in 2006, accused Dean of hypocrisy. Judicial Watch filed a lawsuit to force the papers be opened before the seal expired but lost.

== 2004 presidential candidacy ==
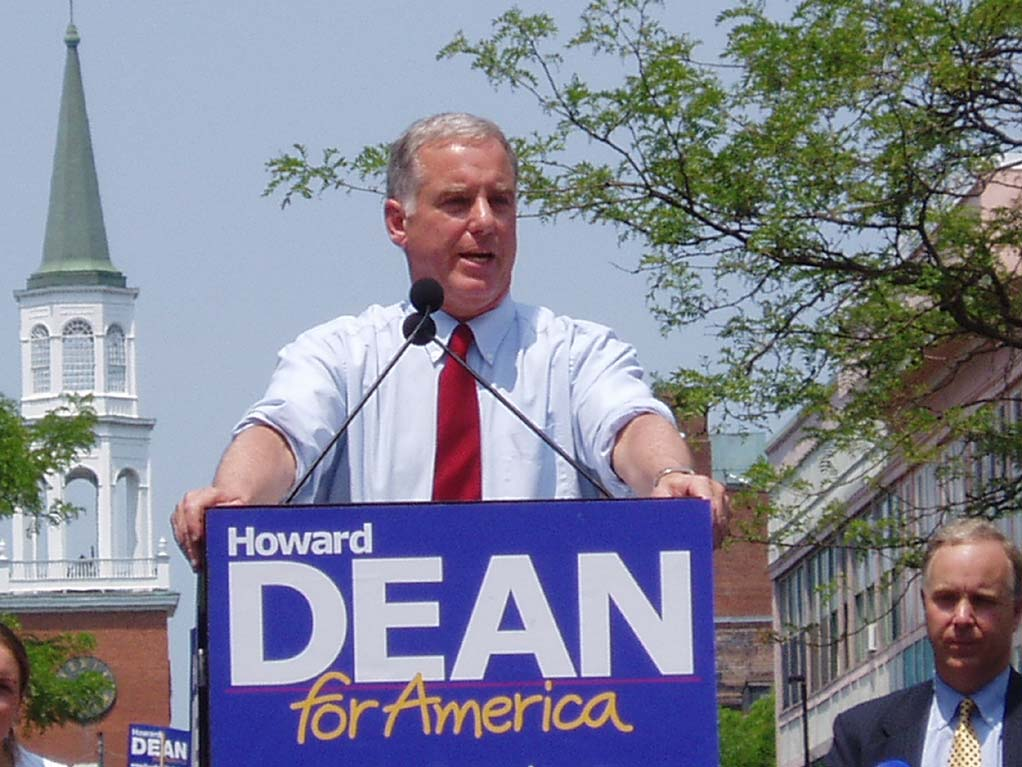
Howard Dean declared his candidacy for the 2004 Democratic Party presidential nomination on June 23, 2003, in Burlington, Vermont.

Dean began his bid for president as a "long shot" candidate. ABC News ranked him eighth out of 12 in a list of potential presidential contenders in May 2002. In March 2003 he gave a speech strongly critical of the Democratic leadership at the California State Democratic Convention that attracted the attention of grassroots party activists and set the tone and the agenda of his candidacy. It began with the line: "What I want to know is what in the world so many Democrats are doing supporting the President's unilateral intervention in Iraq?"

That summer, his campaign was featured as the cover article in The New Republic and in the following months he received expanded media attention. His campaign slowly gained steam, and by autumn of 2003, Dean had become the apparent frontrunner for the Democratic nomination, performing strongly in most polls and outpacing his rivals in fundraising. This latter feat was attributed mainly to his innovative embrace of the Internet for campaigning, using Meetup.com to track supporters and encourage grassroots participation in the campaign. The majority of his donations came from individual Dean supporters, who came to be known as Deanites, or, more commonly, Deaniacs, a term coined to describe meetup participants, who passed out campaign materials supporting Dean and the broader movement. (Critics often labeled them "Deany Boppers", or "Deanie Babies", a reference to his support from young activists.) Following Dean's presidential campaign, some Deaniacs remained engaged in the political process through Democracy for America and similar locally oriented organizations.

=== Message and themes ===
Dean began his campaign by emphasizing healthcare policy and ‘fiscal responsibility’, and championing grassroots fundraising as a way to fight lobby groups. However, his opposition to the U.S. plan to invade Iraq (and his forceful criticism of Democrats in Congress who voted to authorize the use of force) quickly eclipsed other issues. By challenging the war in Iraq at a time when mainstream Democratic leaders were either neutral or cautiously supportive, Dean positioned himself to appeal to his party's activist base. Dean often quoted the late Minnesota Senator Paul Wellstone (who had recently died in a plane crash) as saying that he represented "the Democratic wing of the Democratic Party." His message resonated among frustrated Democratic primary voters who felt that their party had not done enough to oppose the policies of the Republicans. Thus, Dean also succeeded in differentiating himself from his primary opponents.

Dean's approach organizationally was also novel. His campaign made extensive use of the Internet. His supporters organized real-world meetings, many of them arranged through Meetup.com, participated in online forums, donated money online, canvassed for advertising ideas, and distributed political talking points. In terms of money, publicity and activism, Dean therefore quickly staked out a leadership position in the field of candidates. In this way, he was able to bypass existing party and activist infrastructure and built his own online network of supporters. In terms of traditional "ground troops", however, Dean remained at a disadvantage. Dean adopted a coffee shop strategy to visit grassroot activists in all 99 Iowa counties, but he lacked the campaign infrastructure to get voters to the polls that his opponents had.

=== Fundraising ===
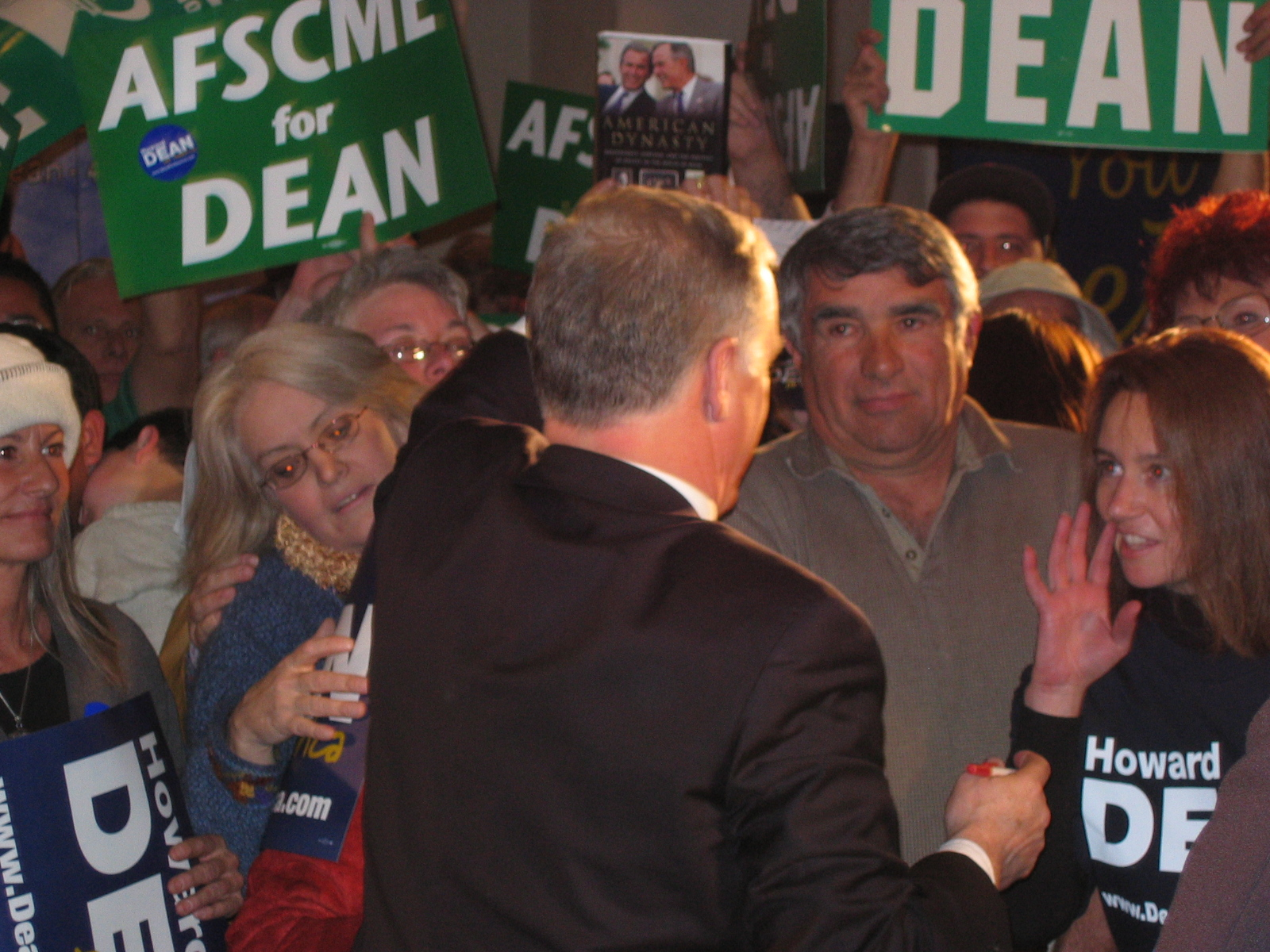
Dean (front, back turned) at a political rally in 2004

In the "Invisible Primary" of raising campaign funds, Howard Dean led the Democratic pack in the early stages of the 2004 campaign. Among the candidates, he ranked first in total raised ($25.4 million as of September 30, 2003) and first in cash-on-hand ($12.4 million). However, even this performance paled next to that of George W. Bush, who by that date had raised $84.6 million for the Republican primary campaign, in which he had no strong challenger. Prior to the 2004 primary season, the Democratic record for most money raised in one quarter by a primary candidate was held by Bill Clinton in 1995, raising $10.3 million during a campaign in which he had no primary opponent. In the third quarter of 2003, the Dean campaign raised $14.8 million, shattering Clinton's record. All told, Dean's campaign raised around $50 million.

While presidential campaigns have traditionally obtained finance by tapping wealthy, established political donors, Dean's funds came largely in small donations over the Internet; the average overall donation was just under $80. This method of fundraising offered several important advantages over traditional fundraising, in addition to the inherent media interest in what was then a novelty. First, raising money on the Internet was relatively inexpensive, compared to conventional methods such as events, telemarketing, and direct mail campaigns. Secondly, as donors on average contributed far less than the legal limit ($2,000 per person), the campaign could continue to resolicit them throughout the election season.

Dean's director of grassroots fundraising, Larry Biddle, came up with the idea of the popular fundraising "bat", an image of a cartoon baseball player and bat which appeared on the site every time the campaign launched a fundraising challenge. The bat encouraged Web site visitors to contribute money immediately through their credit cards. This would lead to the bat filling up like a thermometer with the red color indicating the total funds. The site often took suggestions from the netroots on their blog. One of these suggestions led to one of the campaign's biggest accomplishments: an image of Dean eating a turkey sandwich encouraged supporters to donate $250,000 in three days to match a big-donor dinner by Vice President Dick Cheney. The online contributions from that day matched what Cheney made from his fundraiser.

In November 2003, after a much-publicized online vote among his followers, Dean became the first Democrat to forgo federal matching funds (and the spending limits that go with them) since the system was established in 1974. (John Kerry later followed his lead.) In addition to state-by-state spending limits for the primaries, the system limits a candidate to spending only $44.6 million until the Democratic National Convention in July, which sum would almost certainly run out soon after the early primary season. (George W. Bush declined federal matching funds in 2000 and did so again for the 2004 campaign.)

Political commentators have stated that the fundraising of Barack Obama, with its emphasis on small donors and the internet, refined and built upon the model that Dean's campaign pioneered.

=== Endorsements ===
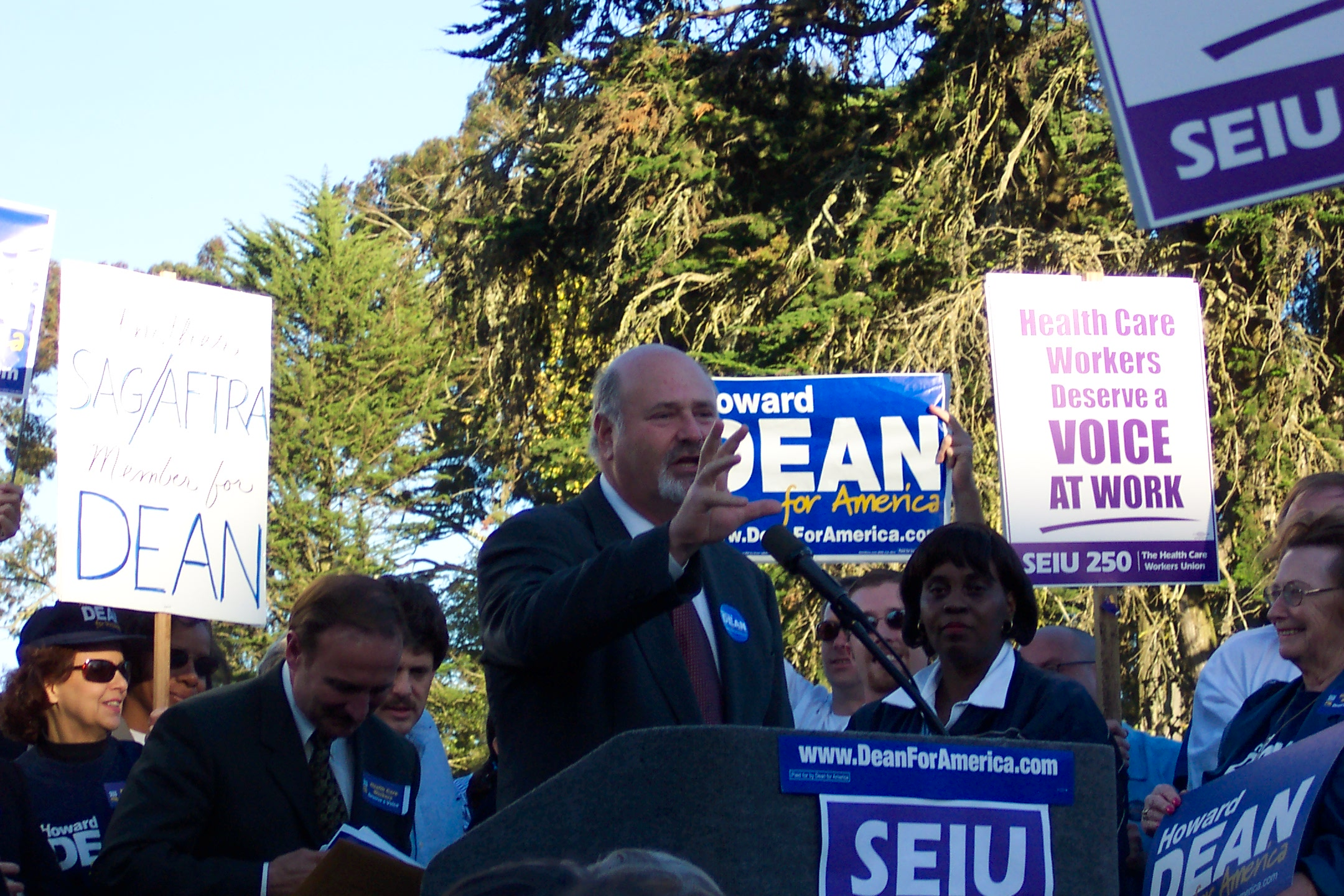
Rob Reiner speaking at a Dean rally on October 29, 2003

Though Dean lagged in early endorsements, he acquired many critical ones as his campaign snowballed. By the time of the Iowa caucuses, he led among commitments from superdelegates– elected officials and party officers entitled to convention votes by virtue of their positions. On November 12, 2003, he received the endorsements of the Service Employees International Union and the American Federation of State, County and Municipal Employees. Dean received the endorsement of former vice president and 2000 presidential candidate Al Gore, on December 9, 2003. In the following weeks Dean was endorsed by former U.S. senators Bill Bradley and Carol Moseley Braun, unsuccessful Democratic presidential candidates from the 2000 and 2004 primaries, respectively.

Other high-profile endorsers included:

- Governors (and former governors) Bruce Babbitt, Lowell P. Weicker Jr., Jim McGreevey, Toney Anaya, Ann Richards
- Senators (and former Senators) Tom Harkin, Fred R. Harris, Howard Metzenbaum, Jim Jeffords, Patrick Leahy
- Representatives (and former Representatives) Jesse Jackson Jr., John Conyers, Major Owens, Sheila Jackson Lee
- Former Baltimore Mayor (and former governor of Maryland) Martin J. O'Malley
- Dean also won the backing of lesser-known political figures, such as former Indiana State Senator and 1984 gubernatorial nominee Wayne Townsend.
- Timothy Kraft, a New Mexico political consultant who had been Jimmy Carter's 1980 campaign manager, came to Vermont to campaign for Dean.

Several celebrities from the entertainment industry endorsed him: Joan Jett, Martin Sheen, Rob Reiner, Susan Sarandon, Paul Newman, Robin Williams, and Joseph Gordon-Levitt.

==== Response ====
Many pundits blamed such endorsements for the campaign's eventual collapse. In particular, Al Gore's early endorsement of Dean weeks before the first primary of the election cycle was severely criticized by eight Democratic contenders particularly since he did not endorse his former running mate, Joe Lieberman. Gore supported Dean over Lieberman due to their differing opinions on Iraq which began to develop around 2002 (Lieberman supported the war and Gore did not). When Dean's campaign failed, some blamed Gore's early endorsement.

=== Iowa Caucus setback and the "Dean scream" media gaffe ===
On January 19, 2004, Dean's rivals John Kerry and John Edwards pushed him into a third-place finish in the 2004 Iowa Democratic caucuses, representing the first votes cast in primary season. Dean's loud outburst in his public address that night was widely rebroadcast and portrayed as a media gaffe that ended his campaign.

According to a Newsday editorial written by Verne Gay, some members of the television audience criticized the speech as loud, peculiar, and unpresidential. In particular, this quote from the speech was aired repeatedly in the days following the caucus:

Not only are we going to New Hampshire, Tom Harkin, we're going to South Carolina and Oklahoma and Arizona and North Dakota and New Mexico, and we're going to California and Texas and New York. ... And we're going to South Dakota and Oregon and Washington and Michigan, and then we're going to Washington, D.C., to take back the White House! Yeah!

Senator Harkin was on stage with Dean, holding his suit jacket. This final "Yeah!" with its unusual tone that Dean later said was due to the cracking of his hoarse voice, has become known in American political jargon as the "Dean Scream" or the "I Have a Scream" speech. Comedians and late-night comedy show hosts such as Dave Chappelle and Conan O'Brien satirized, mocked, and popularized the sound bite, beginning a media onslaught that many believe contributed immensely to his poor showing in the subsequent races.

Dean conceded that the speech did not project the best image, jokingly referring to it as a "crazy, red-faced rant" on the Late Show with David Letterman. In an interview later that week with Diane Sawyer, he said he was "a little sheepish ... but I'm not apologetic." Sawyer and many others in the national broadcast news media later expressed some regret about overplaying the story. CNN issued a public apology and admitted in a statement that they might have "overplayed" the incident. The incessant replaying of the "Dean Scream" by the press became a debate on the topic of whether Dean was the victim of media bias. The scream scene was shown an estimated 633 times by cable and broadcast news networks in just four days following the incident, a number that does not include talk shows and local news broadcasts. Some in the audience that day reported that they were unaware of the "scream" until they saw it on TV. Dean said after the general election in 2004, that his microphone picked up only his voice and did not also capture the loud cheering he received from the audience as a result of the speech. On January 27, Dean finished second to Kerry in the New Hampshire primary. As late as one week before the first votes were cast in Iowa's caucuses, Dean had enjoyed a 30% lead in New Hampshire opinion polls; accordingly, this loss represented another major setback to his campaign.

Iowa and New Hampshire were the first in a string of losses for the Dean campaign, culminating in a third place showing in the Wisconsin primary on February 17. Two days before the Wisconsin primary, campaign advisor Steve Grossman announced through an article written by The New York Times Dean campaign correspondent Jodi Wilgoren that he would offer his services to any of the other major candidates "should Dean not win in Wisconsin." This scoop further undermined Dean's campaign. Grossman later issued a public apology. The next day, Dean announced that his candidacy had "come to an end", though he continued to urge people to vote for him, so that Dean delegates would be selected for the convention and could influence the party platform. He later won the Vermont primary on Super Tuesday, March 2. This latter victory, a surprise even to Dean, was due in part to the lack of a serious anti-Kerry candidate in Vermont (John Edwards had declined to put his name on the state's ballot, expecting Dean to win in a landslide), and in part to a television ad produced, funded, and aired in Vermont by grassroots Dean supporters.

=== Impact ===
The New York Observer attributed Barack Obama's success in the 2008 presidential election to his perfection of the internet organizing model that Dean pioneered.

On October 11, 2007, it was reported that Leonardo DiCaprio and George Clooney were in early talks about making a "political thriller" based on Howard Dean's 2004 campaign, tentatively titled Farragut North. The movie, finally titled The Ides of March, was released on October 7, 2011. It is based on the play Farragut North, which was named after the Washington Metro station located in the center of the lobbyist district. The play was written by Beau Willimon, a staffer on the Dean campaign. The main character is based on a former press secretary for the Dean campaign.

In November 2008, a documentary film about Dean and his campaign, Dean and Me, was released and shown at several film festivals around the country.

=== Post-campaign and Democracy for America ===
Following Dean's withdrawal after the Wisconsin primary, he pledged to support the eventual Democratic nominee. He remained neutral until John Kerry became the presumptive nominee. Dean endorsed Kerry on March 25, 2004, in a speech at The George Washington University in Washington, D.C.

On March 18, 2004, Dean founded the group Democracy for America. This group was created to house the large, Internet-based organization Dean created for his presidential campaign. Its goal is to help like-minded candidates get elected to local, state, and federal offices. It has endorsed several sets of twelve candidates known as the Dean Dozen. Dean turned over control of the organization to his brother, Jim Dean, when he became Chairman of the Democratic National Committee.

Dean strongly urged his supporters to support Kerry as opposed to Ralph Nader, arguing that a vote for Nader would only help to re-elect President George W. Bush because he believed that most who vote for Nader are likely to have voted for Kerry if Ralph Nader was not running. Dean argued that Nader would be more effective if he lobbied on election law reform issues during his campaign. Dean supported several election law reform issues such as campaign finance reform and instant-runoff voting.

== DNC Chairmanship ==
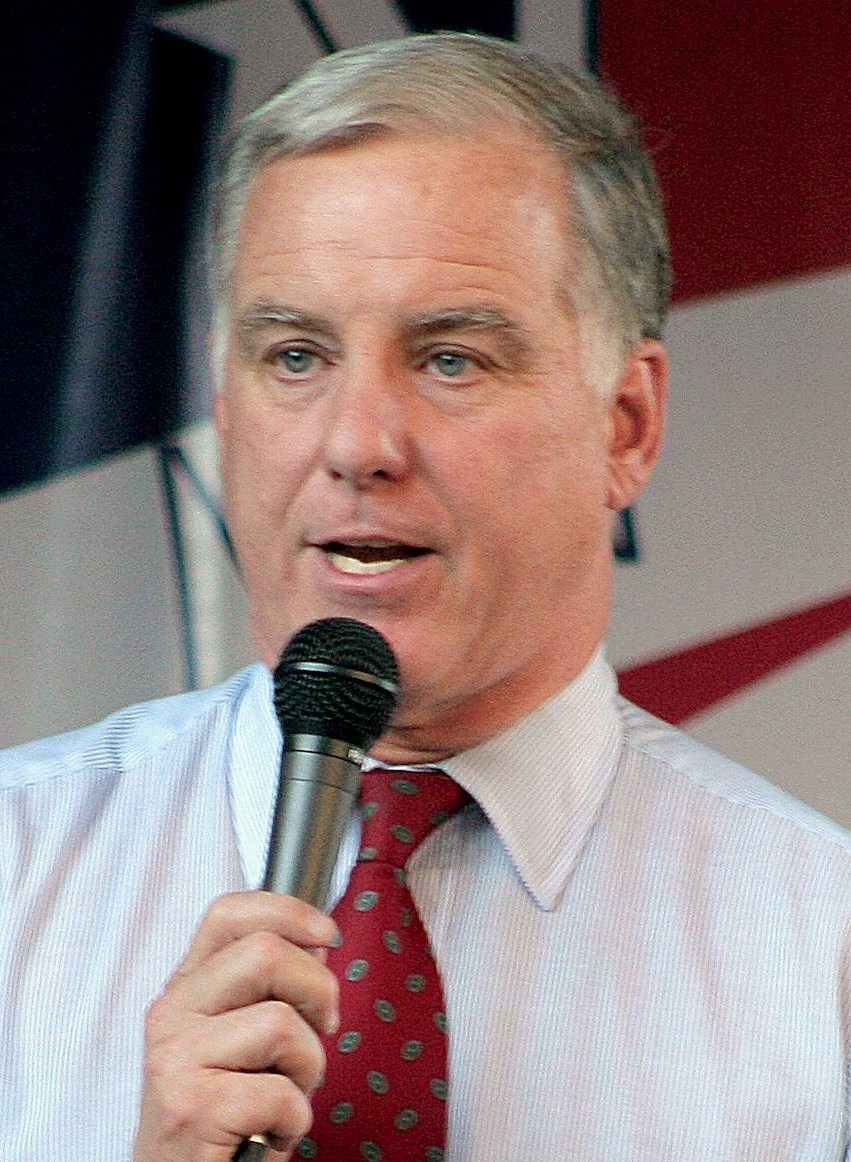
Dean speaking in 2006

Dean was elected Chairman of the Democratic National Committee (DNC) on February 12, 2005, after all his opponents dropped out of the race when it became apparent Dean had the votes to become chair. Those opponents included former Congressman Martin Frost, former Denver Mayor Wellington Webb, former Congressman and 9/11 Commissioner Tim Roemer, and strategists Donnie Fowler, David Leland, and Simon Rosenberg.

Many prominent Democrats opposed Dean's campaign; House Leader Nancy Pelosi and Senate Leader Harry Reid are rumored to be among them. Dean satisfied his critics by promising to focus on fundraising and campaigning as DNC Chair and avoid policy statements. He was succeeded by Tim Kaine, who at the time of his election was the governor of Virginia, in 2009.

Dean ran for the position a second time in 2016. Two days after Hillary Clinton's defeat in the 2016 presidential election, he announced that he would again seek the chairmanship. There were other contenders at the time who had been endorsed by Senator Bernie Sanders of Vermont, and Senate Minority Leader-elect Chuck Schumer of New York. On December 2, 2016, Dean withdrew his candidacy.

During his 2005-2009 tenure, he promoted a "fifty-state strategy" and developed innovative fund-raising strategies.

=== Fifty-state strategy ===
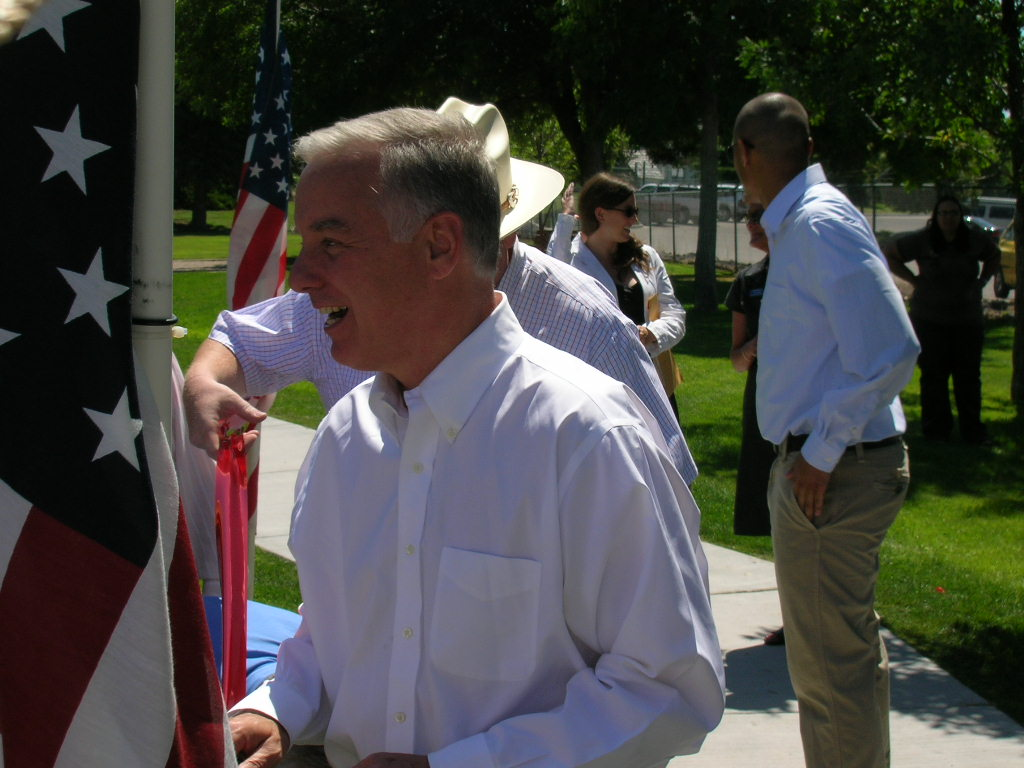
Dean at a Democratic Party event in Pocatello, Idaho, August 2007

After Dean became Chairman of the DNC, he pledged to bring reform to the Party. Rather than focusing just on swing states, Dean proposed what has come to be known as the fifty-state strategy, the goal of which was for the Democratic Party to be committed to winning elections at every level in every region of the country, with Democrats organized in every single voting precinct. State party chairs lauded Dean for raising money directly for the individual state parties.

Dean's strategy used a post-Watergate model taken from the Republicans of the mid-seventies. Working at the local, state and national level, the GOP built the party from the ground up. Dean's plan was to seed the local level with young and committed candidates, building them into state candidates in future races. Dean traveled extensively throughout the country with the plan, including places like Utah, Mississippi, and Texas, states in which Republicans had dominated the political landscape. Many establishment Democrats were at least initially dubious about the strategy's worth—political consultant and former Bill Clinton advisor, Paul Begala, suggested that Dean's plan was "just hiring a bunch of staff people to wander around Utah and Mississippi and pick their nose." Further changes were made in attempting to make the stated platform of the Democratic Party more coherent and compact. Overhauling the website, the official platform of the 2004 campaign, which was largely criticized as avoiding key issues and being the product of party insiders, was replaced with a simplified, though comprehensive categorizing of positions on a wide range of issues.

Dean's strategy arguably paid off in a historic victory as the Democrats took over control of the House of Representatives and the Senate in the 2006 mid-term elections. While it is likely this is also attributable to the shortcomings of the Republican Party in their dealings with the Iraq War and the scandals that occurred shortly before the election, Dean's emphasis on connecting with socially conservative, economic moderates in Republican-dominated states appears to have made some impact. Indeed, Democratic candidates won elections in such red states as Kansas, Indiana, and Montana. And while former Clinton strategist James Carville criticized Dean's efforts, saying more seats could have been won with the traditional plan of piling money solely into close races, the results and the strategy were met with tremendous approval by the party's executive committee in its December 2006 meeting. While he was chairman of the DCCC, Rahm Emanuel was known to have had disagreements over election strategy with Dean; Emanuel believed a more tactical approach, focusing attention on key districts, was necessary to ensure victory. Emanuel himself was criticised for his failure to support some progressive candidates, as Dean advocated.

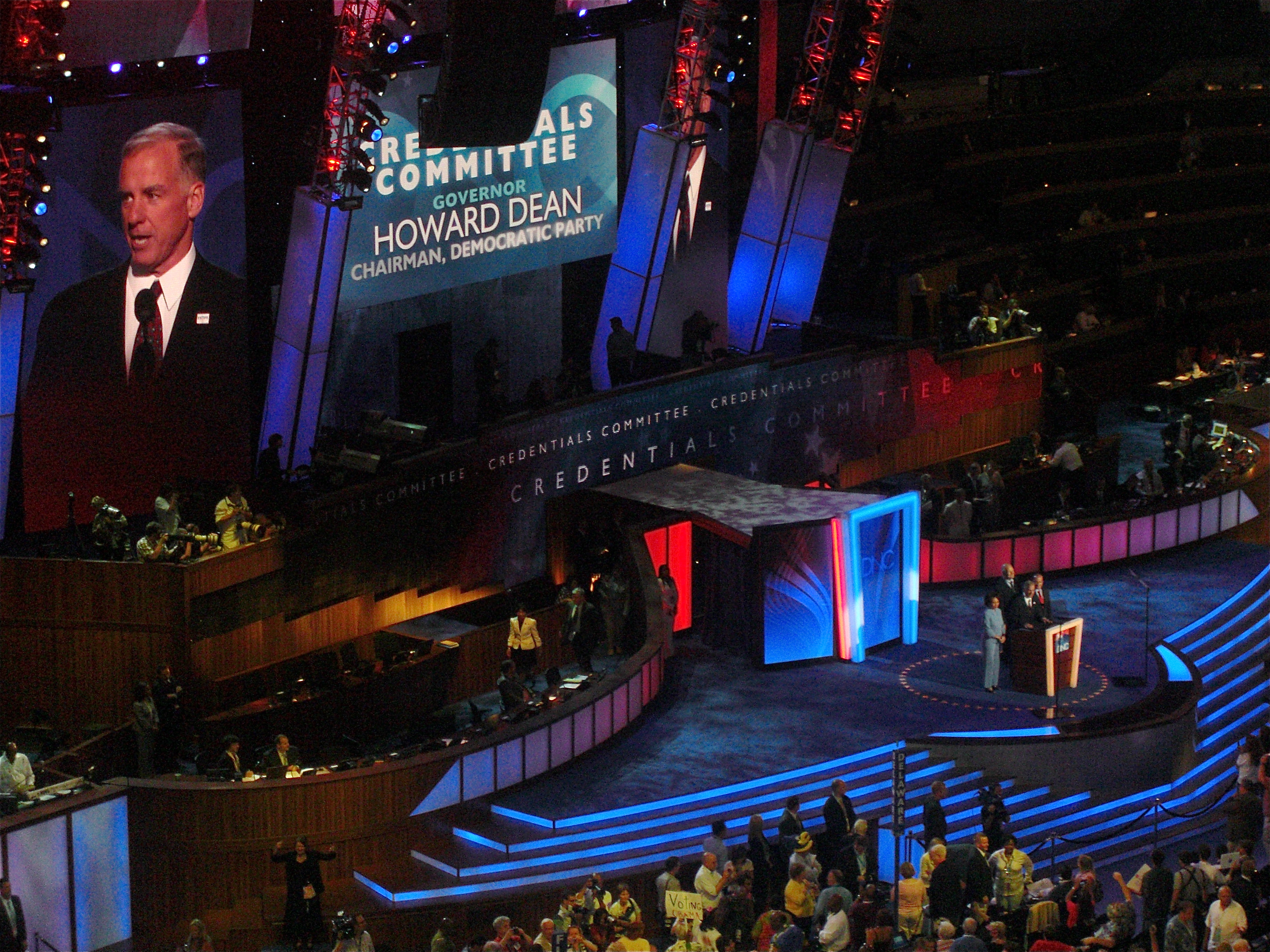
Dean conducts convention business on the first day of the 2008 Democratic National Convention in Denver, Colorado.

The 50-state strategy relied on the idea that building the Democratic Party is at once an incremental election by election process as well as a long-term vision in party building. Democrats cannot compete in counties in which they do not field candidates. Therefore, candidate recruitment emerged as a component element of the 50-state strategy.

To build the party, the DNC under Dean worked in partnership with state Democratic parties in bringing the resources of the DNC to bear in electoral efforts, voter registration, candidate recruitment, and other interlocking component elements of party building. Decentralization was also a core component of the party's approach. The idea was that each state party had unique needs but could improve upon its efforts through the distribution of resources from the national party.

The 50-state strategy was acknowledged by political commentators as an important factor in allowing Barack Obama to compete against John McCain in many states that were previously considered solidly Republican during the 2008 presidential election, most notably when it comes to Obama's victories in Indiana, North Carolina, and Virginia.

=== Fundraising strategies ===
Through grassroots fundraising, Howard Dean was able to raise millions more than the previous DNC Chairman at the same point after the 2000 election. The year after his election, Dean had raised the most money by any DNC Chairman in a similar post election period. This was especially apparent when the Federal Election Commission reported that the DNC had raised roughly $86.3 million in the first six months of 2005, an increase of over 50% on the amount raised during the same period of 2003. In comparison, the RNC fundraising activities represented a gain of only 2%. Additional attempts to capitalize on this trend was the introduction of "Democracy Bonds," a program under which small donors would give a set amount every month. Although it only reached over 31,000 donors by May 2006, far off-pace from the stated goal of 1 million by 2008, it nonetheless contributed to a new small-donor funding philosophy of the DNC. Dean continued to further develop online fundraising at the DNC. Just one month before Election Day 2006, he became the first to introduce the concept of a "grassroots match," where donors to the DNC pledged to match the first donation made by a new contributor. The DNC stated that the resulting flood of contributions led to 10,000 first-time donors in just a few days.

== Post-DNC career ==
=== Political involvement ===
==== Potential Obama administration role ====
Supporters of Dean were angry that he was not given a position in the new Obama administration and not invited to the press conference at which Tim Kaine was introduced as his successor as Democratic National Committee chairman. Joe Trippi, who was Dean's presidential campaign manager in 2004, told Politico, "[Dean] was never afraid to challenge the way party establishment in Washington did business, and that doesn't win you friends in either party." Trippi further explained the apparent snub of Dean by stating, "You don't have to look any further than Rahm Emanuel." Trippi was referring to the tension between Emanuel and Dean over Dean's 50 state strategy. Sources close to Emanuel dismissed these charges.

Dean said: "I didn't do this for the spoils. I did this for the country. I'm very happy that Barack Obama is president, and I think he's picked a great Cabinet. And I'm pretty happy. I wouldn't trade my position for any other position right now. I'm going to go into the private sector, make a living making speeches, and do a lot of stuff on health care policy."

When asked about not being selected for a position in the Obama administration, Dean responded, "Obviously, it would have been great, but it's not happening and the president has the right to name his own Cabinet, so I'm not going to work in the government it looks like." When asked how he felt about not being selected, Dean replied he would "punt on that one." After the withdrawal of Tom Daschle's nomination for the position, Dean had been touted by some for the post of Secretary of Health and Human Services. After being passed over for the post once again, Dean commented: "I was pretty clear that I would have liked to have been Secretary of HHS but it is the president's choice and he decided to go in a different direction."

==== UK politics ====
Outside the US Dean is a supporter of the Liberal Democrats party of the United Kingdom. He has close links with the party and has spoken at their party conference in the past. Since the UK began the Brexit process, he has continued to tweet his support for the party.

==== People's Mujahedin of Iran ====
After leaving office Dean emerged as a major supporter of the People's Mujahedin of Iran (Mujahedeen-e-Khalq, or MEK), calling for it to be delisted as a terrorist group by the United States, which occurred on September 21, 2012.

==== 2016 presidential election ====
Dean endorsed Hillary Clinton during the 2016 presidential election instead of Vermont Senator Bernie Sanders from his home state in September 2015.

Dean questioned on Twitter whether Donald Trump's sniffing during a presidential debate was due to cocaine use, and later apologized for "using innuendo."

=== Private sector ===
In a January 2009 interview with the Associated Press, Dean indicated he would enter the private sector after 30 years in politics. Dean told the AP he would deliver speeches and share ideas about campaigns and technology with center-left political parties around the world. He became a contributor to the news network MSNBC in shows such as The Last Word with Lawrence O'Donnell. He has also guest hosted Countdown with Keith Olbermann and The Rachel Maddow Show. He is on the board of the National Democratic Institute.

Dean also serves as a Senior Presidential Fellow at Hofstra University. He has been a Senior Fellow at the Yale Jackson Institute for Global Affairs and a visiting professor at Williams College. He has been a Senior Strategic Advisor and Independent Consultant for the Government Affairs practice at McKenna, Long & Aldridge. In December 2018 Dean joined the advisory board of Tilray, one of the world's largest cannabis companies. Dean is a member of the Canadian American Business Council's Advisory Board.

== Personal life ==
In 1981, Dean married fellow doctor Judith Steinberg Dean, whom he met in medical school, and together they began a family medical practice in Shelburne, Vermont.

=== Religion ===
Although raised as an Episcopalian, Dean joined a Congregational church in 1982 after a dispute with the local Episcopal diocese over a bike trail. By his own account, he did not attend church as of the early 2000s. Dean has stated he is "more spiritual than religious".

== Notes ==
Party political offices
Preceded by John Carnahan	Democratic nominee for Lieutenant Governor of Vermont; 1986, 1988, 1990	Succeeded by David Wolk
Preceded by Peter Welch	Democratic nominee for Governor of Vermont; 1992, 1994, 1996, 1998, 2000	Succeeded by Doug Racine
Preceded by Gaston Caperton	Chair of the Democratic Governors Association; 1996–1997	Succeeded by Pedro Rosselló
Preceded by Terry McAuliffe	Chair of the Democratic National Committee; 2005–2009	Succeeded by Tim Kaine
Political offices
Preceded by Peter Smith	Lieutenant Governor of Vermont; 1987–1991	Succeeded by Barbara Snelling
Preceded by Richard Snelling	Governor of Vermont; 1991–2003	Succeeded by Jim Douglas
Preceded by Carroll Campbell	Chair of the National Governors Association; 1994–1995	Succeeded by Tommy Thompson
U.S. order of precedence (ceremonial)
Preceded by Madeleine M. Kunin as Former Governor	Order of precedence of the United States	Succeeded by Jim Douglas as Former Governor
