= Barbara Snelling =

American politician (1928–2015)

Barbara W. Snelling

78th Lieutenant Governor of Vermont
- In office January 7, 1993 – January 9, 1997
- Governor: Howard Dean
- Preceded by: Howard Dean
- Succeeded by: Doug Racine

Member of the Vermont State Senate from the Chittenden district
- In office 1999–2002
- Succeeded by: Diane B. Snelling

First Lady of Vermont
- In role January 10, 1991 – August 13, 1991
- Governor: Richard A. Snelling
- Preceded by: Arthur Kunin (as First Gentleman)
- Succeeded by: Judith Steinberg Dean
- In role January 6, 1977 – January 10, 1985
- Governor: Richard A. Snelling
- Preceded by: Madge Salmon
- Succeeded by: Arthur Kunin (as First Gentleman)

Personal details
- Born: Barbara Tuttle Weil; March 22, 1928 Fall River, Massachusetts, U.S.
- Died: November 2, 2015 (aged 87) South Burlington, Vermont, U.S.
- Party: Republican
- Spouse: Richard A. Snelling (m. 1947; died 1991)
- Children: 4, including Diane
- Education: Smith College; Radcliffe College

Barbara Tuttle Snelling (née Weil; March 22, 1928 – November 2, 2015) was an American politician who served as the 78th lieutenant governor of Vermont from 1993 to 1997. She suffered a cerebral hemorrhage in 1996 while campaigning for governor. She was elected to the Vermont State Senate in 1998, where she served until she suffered a second stroke; she resigned in 2002. The wife of governor Richard A. Snelling, she served as the First Lady of Vermont from 1977 to 1985 and again for 215 days in 1991.

== Life and career ==
Snelling was born Barbara Tuttle Weil in 1928 in Fall River, Massachusetts, the daughter of Hazel (née Russell) and The Reverend F. Taylor Weil. She attended Smith College for two years before transferring to Radcliffe College, from which she received her Bachelor of Arts degree Magna Cum Laude in 1950.

She served as chair of the Shelburne School Board; as Founding Chair of Champlain Valley Union High School Board. She was member of the State Board of Education; President of the Vermont State School Boards Association; Vermont Commission on Alcohol and Drug Rehabilitation; Chair of the Chittenden County United Way.

She was a founding trustee of the Vermont Community Foundation; a trustee of Champlain College and Radcliffe College. She was a trustee of the Shelburne Museum.

She was Vice President of the University of Vermont and later was President of Snelling and Kolb, a national fundraising consulting firm focused of development work for educational institutions.

On June 14, 1947, at age 19, she married 20-year-old Richard A. Snelling, who would later served four full terms as governor of Vermont and died in office during his fifth term on August 13, 1991. Their children included Jacqueline, Mark, Andrew, and Diane, who was appointed to Snelling's seat in the State Senate.

Richard's death sparked Barbara's decision to enter politics herself. She was elected Lieutenant Governor of Vermont in 1992, and re-elected in 1994. She announced her candidacy for Governor of Vermont in 1996, but withdrew from the race in June after suffering a cerebral hemorrhage in April of that year. Democratic incumbent Howard Dean, who assumed the office after Richard Snelling's death, won election to his third full term.

Snelling died at her home in South Burlington, Vermont on November 2, 2015.

== See also ==
- List of female lieutenant governors in the United States

== Notes ==
Party political offices
Preceded by Michael Bernhardt	Republican nominee for Lieutenant Governor of Vermont; 1992, 1994	Succeeded by John Carroll
Preceded by John Carroll	Republican nominee for Lieutenant Governor of Vermont; 1998	Succeeded by Brian Dubie
Political offices
Preceded by Howard Dean	Lieutenant Governor of Vermont; 1993–1997	Succeeded by Doug Racine
Honorary titles
Preceded by Arthur Kunin (as First Gentleman)	First Lady of Vermont; 1991	Succeeded by Judith Steinberg Dean
Preceded by Madge Salmon	First Lady of Vermont; 1977–1985	Succeeded by Arthur Kunin (as First Gentleman)
