= Charles R. Chamberlain =

American political leader

- Born: October 25, 1969 (age 57); Los Angeles, California, U.S.
- Occupations: Executive Director at Democracy for America (2013-present)

Charles Robert Chamberlain is an American political leader. He was the executive director at Democracy for America (DFA), a progressive political action committee, headquartered in Burlington, Vermont.

== Background ==
Chamberlain grew up in California and has lived all across the country. He was born in Los Angeles on October 25, 1969. Charles married Alejandra Lorenzo, one of the original singers in the platinum recording group Exposé, on December 20, 1996. He has worked for several political organizations including Progressive Campaigns, Inc., Capital Campaigns, Democracy Resources, and currently Democracy for America (DFA) headquartered in Burlington, Vermont.

== Democracy for America ==
On July 9, 2006 Chamberlain began as the political field director at Democracy for America (DFA), after spending three years as volunteer leader for DFA Miami-Dade. As Political Director for DFA, Charles led campaigns for progressive candidates and causes. Some of his major accomplishments include Ned Lamont for Senate in 2006, the DFA Pulse Poll, the 2008 campaign to shut down the Vermont Yankee nuclear power plant, and pushing for the Public health insurance option in 2009.

In 2006 Chamberlain led the campaign for Democratic Connecticut Senate candidate Ned Lamont. Lamont ran against Senator Joe Lieberman in the 2006 August Democratic Senate primaries. Both Lamont and Lieberman had opposing positions on the Iraq War: Lamont centered his campaign around his own anti-war views while Lieberman continued to support military involvement in Iraq. Lamont won the primaries, but lost in the September general election to Lieberman. Despite Lamont's loss in the general election, Charles saw the Lamont campaign as successful in another sense; it inspired Democrats across the country to run their 2006 campaigns on ending the Iraq War.

In 2008, Newsweek announced that a Democratic Party committee had tossed out a plan to take nominating power away from superdelegates. Chamberlain supported the original reform, which redefined a superdelegate's voting powers so that they were required to vote for a candidate assigned to them, based on the results of their state's caucus or primary. Charles voiced his opposition to the rules committee's decision to knock down the reform and replace it with a weaker one. The article quoted Chamberlain as saying, “Any reform that allows superdelegates to overturn the vote and will of Democratic voters nationwide is not real reform.”

Beginning in 2008, Chamberlain led a DFA campaign to shut down Vermont Yankee as scheduled. DFA and the Vermont Public Interest Research Group (VPIRG) aired a television advertisement on February 19, 2010, advocating that Vermont follow through with its plan to close the nuclear power plant in 2012.

During the 2008 primary election, Charles ran the largest online primary poll, the DFA Pulse Poll. With over 150,000 votes cast, the Pulse Poll was the largest internet Chamberlain to date in the 2008 primary.

In 2009 Chamberlain pushed senators to vote for the Public health insurance option. On August 28, 2009 Charles appeared on NPR's All Things Considered to discuss the Public Option, Senator Kent Conrad (Democrat, North Dakota), and Conrad's bipartisan co-op proposal. He criticized Conrad's proposal for being a political compromise, “Bipartisanship for the sake of bipartisanship is not worth of that bill. America needs real change when it comes to our health care reform. And we absolutely need to have the choice of a public option if we want to achieve that kind of change.”

On the 2011 United States debt ceiling crisis, Chamberlain praised House minority leader Nancy Pelosi for standing up to GOP demands for cuts to Medicare and Social Security. “What we really need is a strong progressive caucus backing up Pelosi,” The Hill quoted Chamberlain as saying, “When it’s Nancy Pelosi versus the president, it’s a tough internal battle for Democrats. I hope they side with Pelosi because that’s what the American people want.”

In a blog post from the French newspaper, Le Monde, Chamberlain provided insight into the 2011 Wisconsin Senate recall elections. “These elections will change the debate in Washington. The Republicans, wherever they are, will not be so eager to touch social programs if they find it gives rise to backlash,” said Chamberlain.

Chamberlain publicly supported bringing progressive Democrat Russ Feingold back to the Wisconsin Senate in 2012. The Washington Current quoted Chamberlain, “I don't need to tell you about Russ or his progressive legacy -- the only Senator to vote against the Patriot Act, a national leader for campaign finance reform and against the war in Iraq, and so much more.” He pushed for Feingold to take an open seat after Senator Herb Kohl (Democrat-Wisconsin) retired in 2012. First elected in 1992, Feingold was defeated in 2010 due to a strong conservative turnout in the polls. Bringing him back to the Wisconsin Senate is seen as a win for Chamberlain and progressives who are opposed to Governor Scott Walker.

In 2013, Chamberlain became the Executive Director of DFA.

== Early political career ==
=== Progressive Campaigns, Inc. ===
Chamberlain started out his career in 1995 managing local and statewide initiative campaigns for Progressive Campaigns, Inc. (PCI) in Santa Monica, California. He worked to establish congressional term limits and allow medical marijuana, and campaigned for Raise Minimum Wage, to increase the US minimum wage. After working as Campaign Director for PCI, Chamberlain went on to work for Assemblyman Scott Wildman of California's 43rd State Assembly district. As Field Representative for Wildman he organized demonstrations and union picket lines, revitalized neighborhood watch programs and helped a community activist create neighborhood councils.

=== Democracy Resources ===
Between 2001 and 2002 Chamberlain ran campaigns for Service Employees International Union (SEIU) and the American Federation of Labor and Congress of Industrial Organizations (AFL-CIO) at Democracy Resources in Oregon. With SEIU he campaigned for Universal Health Care. With AFL-CIO he worked a second time for Raise Minimum Wage.

=== Democracy for America Miami-Dade ===
Chamberlain was elected as Volunteer Leader at the Miami branch of Democracy for America (DFA Miami-Dade) in 2003. In 2005 Charles fought and won to protect his freedom of expression, after almost being arrested for handing out anti-war pamphlets in Easterlin Park. As Volunteer Leader, he teamed up with STAND (Students Toward a New Democracy) to get University of Miami custodial workers unionized in the University of Miami Justice for Janitors campaign.

On January 15, 2005 Chamberlain and Jody Finver, another DFA member, tabled at the South Florida Folk Festival handing out small fliers about a protest against the Iraq war that DFA was planning. Shortly after the festival began, a park manager told them it was illegal to discuss politics or distribute political information in a public park, according to the American Civil Liberties Union (ACLU). The park manager told them that they must leave or they would face arrest. Charles and Jody complied, but brought the matter before the ACLU. The ACLU ultimately determined that Broward County Parks are considered “traditional public forums,” where freedom of expression is allowed, including political discussion and distribution of political pamphlets.
