= 1996 Vermont gubernatorial election =

- November 5, 1996
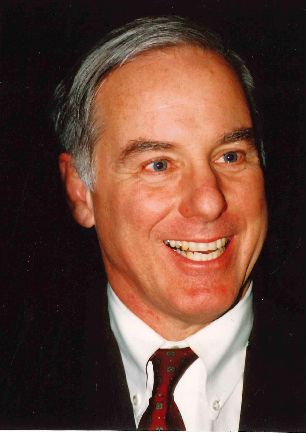

Nominee	Howard Dean	John L. Gropper
Party	Democratic	Republican
Popular vote	179,544	57,161
Percentage	70.51%	22.45%
- Dean: 40–50% 50–60% 60–70% 70–80% 80–90% Gropper: 40–50% 50–60% 60–70%
Governor before election
Howard Dean
Democratic
Elected Governor
Howard Dean
Democratic

The 1996 Vermont gubernatorial election took place on November 5, 1996. Incumbent Democrat Howard Dean ran successfully for re-election to a third full term as Governor of Vermont, defeating Republican nominee John L. Gropper.

This is the last time that Essex, Orleans, and Caledonia counties voted Democratic in a gubernatorial election.

== Democratic primary ==
=== Results ===
Democratic primary results
Party	Candidate	Votes	%	±%
Democratic	Howard Dean (incumbent)	18,112	97.8	
Democratic	Other	406	2.1	
Total votes		18,518	100.0	

== Republican primary ==
Lieutenant Governor Barbara Snelling announced a campaign, but withdrew from the race in June after suffering a cerebral hemorrhage in April.

=== Results ===
Republican primary results
Party	Candidate	Votes	%	±%
Republican	John L. Gropper	12,616	62.2	
Republican	Thomas J. Morse	6,710	33.0	
Republican	Other	956	4.7	
Total votes		20,282	100.0	

== Liberty Union primary ==
=== Results ===
Liberty Union primary results
Party	Candidate	Votes	%	±%
Liberty Union	Mary Alice Herbert	237	92.2	
Liberty Union	Other	20	7.7	
Total votes		257	100.0	

== General election ==
=== Results ===
1996 Vermont gubernatorial election
Party	Candidate	Votes	%	±%
Democratic	Howard Dean (incumbent)	179,544	70.51	+1.42
Republican	John L. Gropper	57,161	22.45	+3.45
Liberty Union	Mary Alice Herbert	4,156	1.63	+0.81
Vermont Grassroots	Dennis Lane	3,667	1.44	
Natural Law	Bill Brunelle	3,342	1.31	+0.52
Independent	August St. John	3,201	1.26	
Libertarian	Neil Randall	2,916	1.15	
Write-in		661	0.26	-0.43
Total votes		254,648	100.00	

== See also ==
- 1996 United States House of Representatives election in Vermont
- 1996 United States presidential election in Vermont
