= Judith Steinberg Dean =

First Lady of Vermont from 1991 to 2003

First Lady of Vermont
- In role August 14, 1991 – January 8, 2003
- Governor: Howard Dean
- Preceded by: Barbara Snelling
- Succeeded by: Dorothy Douglas

Second Lady of Vermont
- In role January 3, 1987 – August 14, 1991
- Lieutenant Governor: Howard Dean
- Preceded by: Arthur Kunin
- Succeeded by: Penny Dubie

Personal details
- Born: Judith Steinberg; May 9, 1953 (age 73) Roslyn, New York, U.S.
- Party: Democratic
- Spouse: Howard Dean (m. 1981)
- Children: 2
- Education: Albert Einstein College of Medicine (M.D.); Princeton University (B.A.)
- Profession: Physician

Judith Steinberg Dean (born May 9, 1953) is an American physician from Burlington, Vermont. She is married to Howard Dean, the former Governor of Vermont and past chairman of the Democratic National Committee. Steinberg Dean was the First Lady of Vermont from 1991 until 2003.

== Early life ==
Judith Steinberg grew up on Long Island in Roslyn, outside New York City. Her parents were both doctors, and her family was Jewish.

She earned her bachelor's degree in biochemistry at Princeton University and then received her Doctor of Medicine degree from Albert Einstein College of Medicine of Yeshiva University, where she met fellow medical student Howard Dean.

== Career ==
After completing a fellowship in hematology at McGill University in Montreal, Steinberg moved to Burlington, Vermont, with Dean in order to set up their joint medical practice. She uses her family name "Dr. Steinberg" while in her practice to differentiate herself from her husband.

As her husband served in the Vermont House of Representatives, and as Lieutenant Governor and Governor, she remained working full-time in her practice. She did not join her husband in his campaign for the U.S. Democratic presidential nomination in 2004 until after he lost the Iowa caucuses.

== Personal life ==
She married Howard Dean in 1981.

Honorary titles
Preceded by Barbara Snelling	First Lady of Vermont; 1991–2003	Succeeded by Dorothy Douglas
Honorary titles
Preceded by Arthur Kunin as Second Gentleman	Second Lady of Vermont; 1987–1991	Succeeded by Penny Dubie
