= Jim Dean (activist) =

American political activist

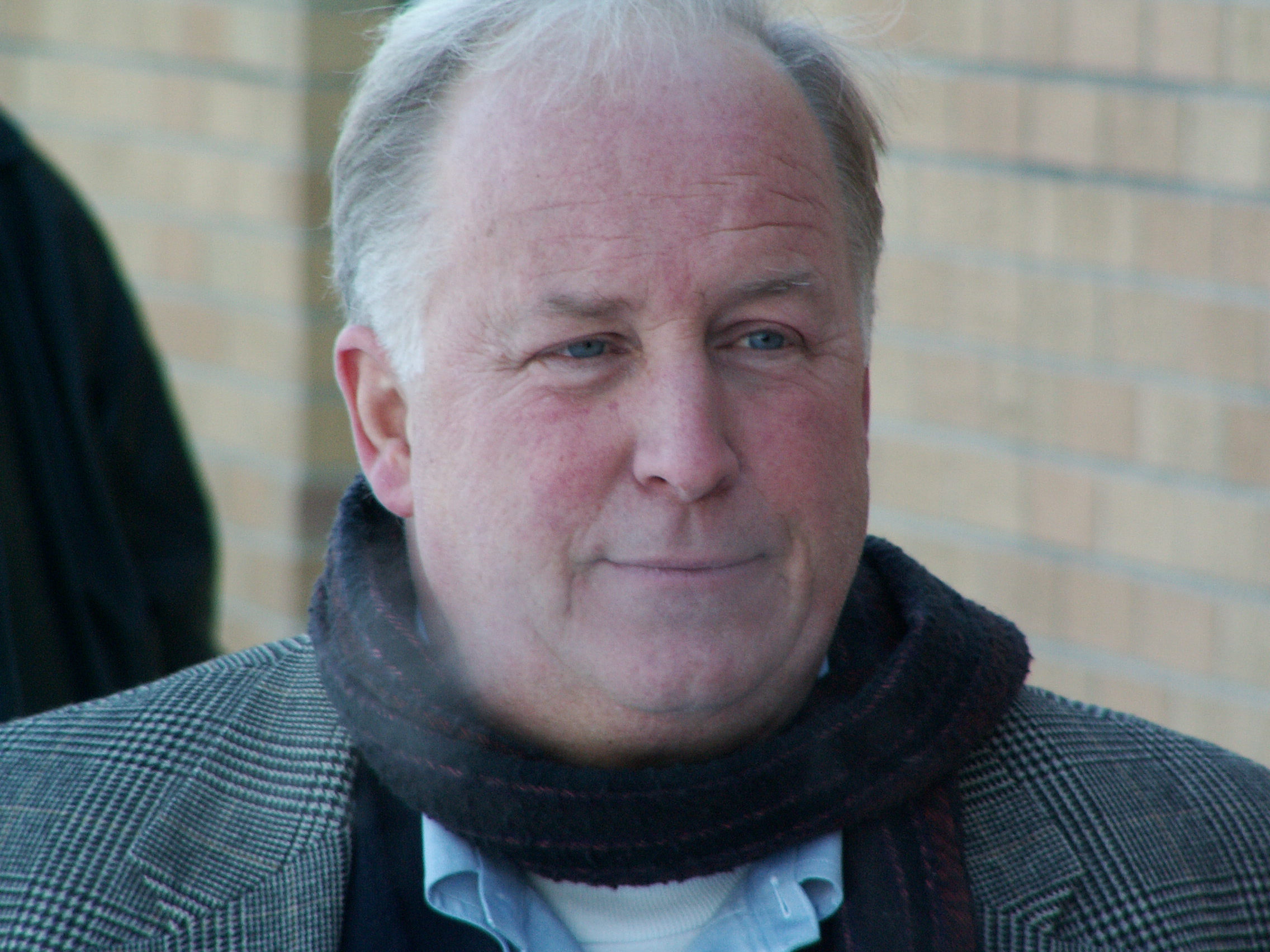
Jim Dean in 2008

James H. Dean is an American political operative who previously served as chair of Democracy for America (DFA), the nation's largest political action committee. The brother of former Vermont governor Howard Dean, DFA was founded in 2004 following the conclusion of his brother's presidential campaign.

== Early biography ==
Before 2002, Dean worked in marketing, business development, and sales at Yankelovich Partners and Greenfield Online.

== Political activities ==
Dean helped raise money for his brother's political campaigns, and worked full-time on Howard Dean's first race, his 1986 run for lieutenant governor of Vermont. In 2005, Jim Dean became chair of DFA. In this role, he has raised money, given speeches, and organized for DFA in his home state of Connecticut.

During the 2016 Democratic Party primary, Dean was a supporter of Bernie Sanders' presidential campaign. Dean left his role as chair in 2018 and was replaced by Yvette Simpson.

== Personal life ==
Jim, his wife Virginia, and their three children live in Fairfield, Connecticut. James, Howard, and their brother Bill were brothers of Charles Dean, who was abducted and killed by communist guerrillas in Laos in 1975.

== See also ==
- Democracy for America
- Howard Dean
