= Democracy for America =

Vermont-based political action committee

- Founded: 2004
- Defunct: 2022
- Headquarters: Burlington, Vermont
- Members: 1 million+
- Chair: Charles R. Chamberlain
- Chief Executive: Yvette Simpson
- Key people: Howard Dean, Jim Dean

Democracy for America (DFA) was a progressive political action committee headquartered in Burlington, Vermont. Founded by former Democratic National Committee Chair Howard Dean in 2004, DFA led public awareness campaigns on a variety of public policy issues, trains activists, and provided funding directly to candidates for office, until it ended operations in 2022. At its peak, the organization had dozens of local chapters and more than a million members in the United States and internationally.

== History ==
=== Foundation and early history (2001–2004) ===
Dean created the PAC Fund for a Healthy America in 2001 in Montpelier in advance of a planned campaign for president. In March 2004, following the conclusion of Dean's presidential campaign, the organization was renamed "Democracy for America."

Following his unsuccessful run for the Democratic nomination in the 2004 presidential election, Dean used the organization to build on the grassroots momentum for Democratic candidates around the country and for his successful campaign to become chair of the Democratic National Committee. DFA used the Internet-based, grassroots organizing that Dean had created for his presidential campaign to help like-minded Democrats get elected. In 2004 the organization endorsed and supported Democrats (known as the Dean Dozen) on the federal, state, and county levels.

=== 2005–2022 ===
In 2005, Dean turned over control of the organization to his brother, Jim Dean, when he became DNC Chair. Since then, Democracy for America has helped elect over 600 progressives into office, including President Barack Obama, while building their membership to over a million like-minded progressives across all fifty states. In 2007, DFA became the first carbon-neutral political action committee in the United States.

Arshad Hasan served as executive director from 2007 to 2013, after which Charles R. Chamberlain became executive director. Effective January 1, 2019, Chamberlain was named chair, while Yvette Simpson was named chief executive. Fundraising efforts collapsed under Simpson. In December 2022, Simpson announced she would step down from the organization, which was no longer solvent and was dissolved. The associated 501(c)4, Democracy for America Advocacy Fund, also known as DFA Advocacy Fund, continued limited operations.

== DFA-List ==
First DFA logo

DFA focused on endorsing candidates at all levels of office, both local and national. DFA's endorsements were often orchestrated by members of local groups, and they provided resources, such as funds and addresses, to the endorsed campaign. According to their records, the group endorsed over 578 candidates. Candidates wishing for an endorsement may apply on the organization's website.

DFA initially endorsed Bernie Sanders in the 2016 presidential race after earning a record-breaking 87.9% of the vote in their online poll.

The organization switched its endorsement in July 2016 "...to stand with Bernie Sanders by joining him in formally endorsing Hillary Clinton for President." Sanders has since formed his own group Our Revolution.

Notable past DFA endorsements have included:

- Keith Ellison for DNC Chair in the 2017 election
- Bernie Sanders for U.S. Senate in Vermont and U.S. President
- Barack Obama for U.S. Senate in Illinois and U.S. President
- Julie Gunnigle for Maricopa County Attorney
- Al Franken for U.S. Senate in Minnesota
- Misty K. Snow for U.S. Senate in Utah
- Mark Begich for U.S. Senate in Alaska
- Ned Lamont for U.S. Senate in Connecticut
- Jeff Merkley for U.S. Senate in Oregon
- Elizabeth Warren for U.S. Senate in Massachusetts
- Howard Dean for DNC Chair
- Deval Patrick for Governor of Massachusetts
- Jon Tester for U.S. Senate in Montana
- Sheldon Whitehouse for U.S. Senate in Rhode Island
- Martin Heinrich for U.S. Representative for New Mexico's 1st district
- Joey Novick for mayor of Flemington, New Jersey
- Sam Yoon for Boston City Council
- Jerry McNerney for U.S. Representative from California's 11th District
- Jack Markell for Governor of Delaware
- Linda McCulloch for Montana Secretary of State
- Debra Bowen for California Secretary of State
- Denise Juneau for Montana Superintendent of Public Instruction
- Donna Edwards for U.S. Representative in Maryland from Maryland's 4th district
- Jim Himes for U.S. Representative for Connecticut's 4th district
- Alan Grayson for U.S. Representative in Florida from Florida's 8th district
- Paulette Jordan for Governor of Idaho in 2018

== Political positions ==
Democracy for America's status on various social and economic issues places the organization strongly on the left of the American political spectrum. Although they often endorse and advocate for Democratic Party candidates, DFA is also to the left of many national and state Democratic lawmakers.

In 2006, the group supported Ned Lamont over Sen. Joseph Lieberman in Connecticut's primary and general elections. DFA also supported Carol Shea-Porter in her Democratic primary and general election victory in New Hampshire's 1st congressional district. In 2008, the group supported Donna Edwards of Maryland's 4th congressional district.

During the 2008 Minnesota Senate election between Norm Coleman and Al Franken, Democracy for America aligned themselves with the Progressive Change Campaign Committee and called their campaign "Donate a Dollar a Day to Make Norm Go Away." Coleman lost to Franken following an official state-wide recount.

=== Domestic issues ===
Before creating this PAC, the group's founder, Howard Dean, who already possessed a considerable platform, had strongly campaigned in favor of universal health care. Therefore, the DFA's first major campaign after the 2008 presidential election focused mainly on this issue, standing in support of universal healthcare.

In 2011, DFA's main issue of interest was the rights of company employees, which was campaigned for, among other things, by promoting unions. DFA, Progressive Change Campaign Committee (or PCCC), and several other organizations with lesser contribution levels, combined funds to spend $2.2 million canvassing about these issues, including phone calls, door-to-door campaigning, and TV ads.

DFA has also campaigned to oppose legislation that requires voters to present government-issued identification cards, birth certificates, or passports before voting. The organization has at various times deemed the laws "excessive" and "Draconian," and has argued that the laws inhibit ordinary citizens from being able to enter the polling stations.

Additionally, DFA's Advocacy Fund has cosponsored a digital sign-on action for universal Pre-K alongside Democratic Congresswoman Suzanne Bonamici and a number of other groups, including Saphron Initiative and Daily Kos.

Furthermore, the DFA campaigns on behalf of legislation to benefit homosexual Americans, to guard the rights afforded to them through the legalization of same-sex marriage in the United States. The organization sent volunteers to Maine to campaign against 2009 Maine Question 1, which nullified a same-sex marriage law passed by the state's legislature. In a related issue, DFA pushed for the repeal of the "Don't Ask, Don't Tell" laws in regard to the U.S. military.

DFA has also run anti-Wall Street campaigns and a "Boycott BP" campaign in response to a leaky oil pipe in the Gulf of Mexico that was owned by BP.

=== Foreign policy issues ===
Democracy for America supported the withdrawal of the United States from the Iraq War.

=== Endorsed presidential candidates ===
In 2008, Democracy for America endorsed Barack Obama, who was then an outspoken critic of the Iraq War. In February 2009, President Obama stated unequivocally that American occupation in Iraq will end no later than August 31, 2010. DFA did not withdraw its support for Obama after he failed to do this.

In 2016, DFA endorsed Bernie Sanders in the 2016 United States presidential election, in accordance with the results of a poll of their supporters conducted on the DFA website.

In 2020, DFA endorsed Bernie Sanders, also in accordance with a website poll.

== Training and scholarships ==
DFA members at both the national and local levels have participated in numerous training programs, intended to instruct prospective candidates on running a successful political campaign. DFA's main training initiative, called the Campaign Academy, consists of 16 hours of interactive workshops that bring hundreds of local activists, campaign staff, and candidates together for 2 days of intensive campaign training. Topics have included; online organizing, shutting down a campaign, canvassing, phone banking, recruiting volunteers, how to increase voter turnout, developing a finance plan, sustaining your media presence, winning with social networks and building a grassroots army: volunteer recruitment.

"DFA Night School" is the organization's online training program. Each session is an hour-long interactive conference call and web presentation where trainees participate and ask questions.

=== Netroots Nation Scholarship competition ===
DFA also awards scholarships to progressive or liberal bloggers, known as the "Netroots Nation Scholarship." In 2010, DFA sent 60 online activists to Netroots Nation, held in Las Vegas, NV, from July 22–25. Other sites for the Netroots Nation Convention have included Austin, Texas, in 2008 and Pittsburgh, Pennsylvania, in 2009.

== Dean Corps ==
In 2010, DFA sent field organizers to progressive campaigns for a program called Dean Corps. Similar to Russ Feingold's Progressive Patriot Corps, organizers represented an in-kind contribution to the recipient campaign. The goal is to hire, train and place field organizers on key progressive campaigns to get more progressive Democrats elected.

== See also ==
- America Coming Together
- Howard Dean
- Jim Dean (activist)
- Dean Dozen
