= Bernie Sanders =

American politician and activist (born 1941)

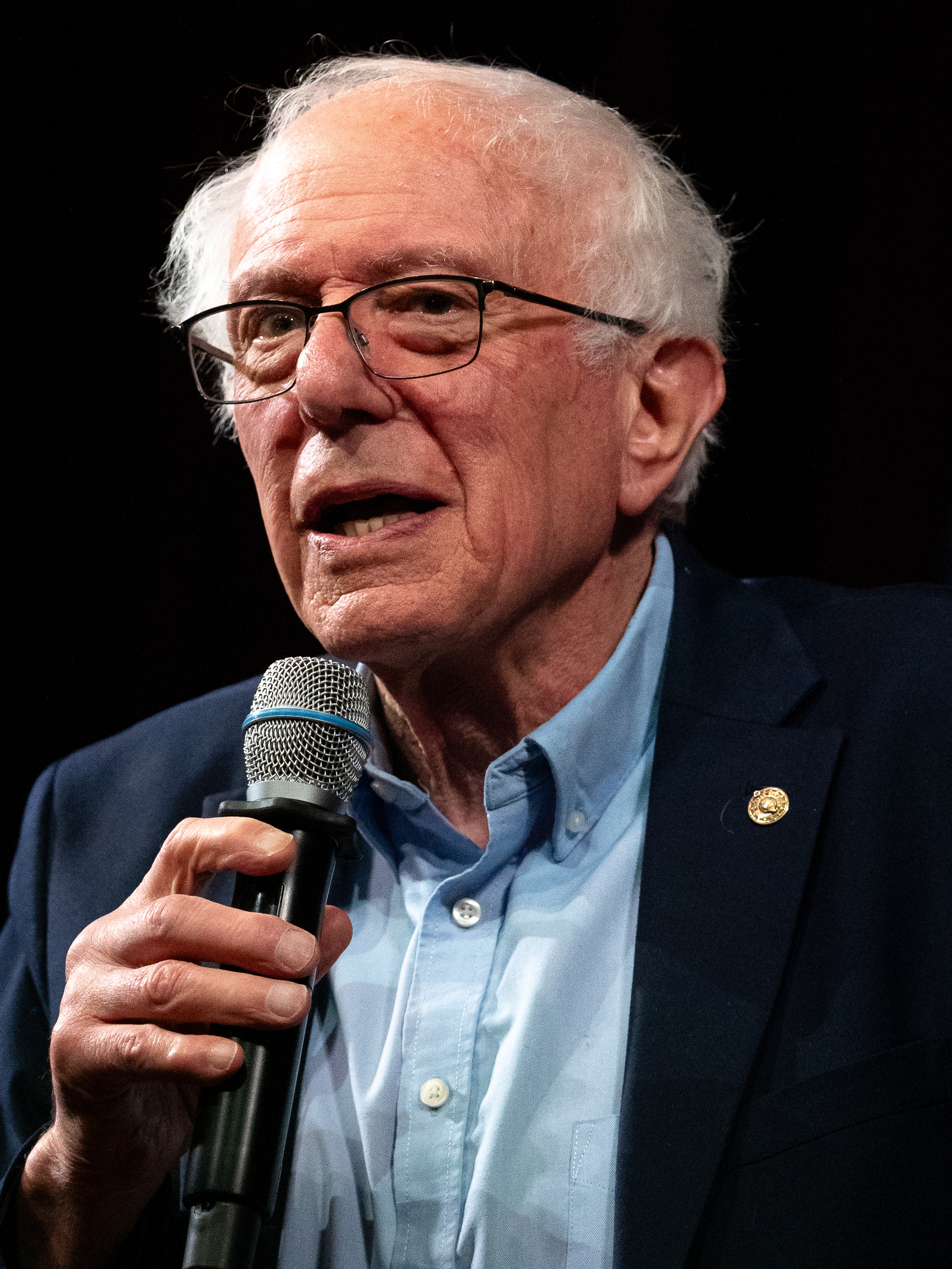
- Sanders in 2026

United States Senator from Vermont
- Incumbent
- Assumed office January 3, 2007 Serving with Peter Welch
- Preceded by: Jim Jeffords

Ranking Member of the Senate Health, Education, Labor and Pensions Committee
- Incumbent
- Assumed office January 3, 2025
- Preceded by: Bill Cassidy
Committee positions
Chair of the Senate Health, Education, Labor and Pensions Committee
In office January 3, 2023 – January 3, 2025
Preceded by	Patty Murray
Succeeded by	Bill Cassidy
Chair of the Senate Democratic Outreach Committee
Incumbent
Assumed office January 3, 2017
Leader	Chuck Schumer
Vice Chair	Catherine Cortez Masto
Preceded by	Amy Klobuchar (Steering and Outreach)
Chair of the Senate Budget Committee
In office February 3, 2021 – January 3, 2023
Preceded by	Mike Enzi
Succeeded by	Sheldon Whitehouse
Chair of the Senate Veterans' Affairs Committee
In office January 3, 2013 – January 3, 2015
Preceded by	Patty Murray
Succeeded by	Johnny Isakson

Member of the U.S. House of Representatives from Vermont's at-large district
- In office January 3, 1991 – January 3, 2007
- Preceded by: Peter Plympton Smith
- Succeeded by: Peter Welch

37th Mayor of Burlington
- In office April 6, 1981 – April 4, 1989
- Preceded by: Gordon Paquette
- Succeeded by: Peter Clavelle

Personal details
- Born: Bernard Sanders; September 8, 1941 (age 85) Brooklyn, New York City, U.S.
- Party: Independent (1978–present)
- Other political affiliations: Young People's Socialist League (1960–1964); Liberty Union (1970–1977); Vermont Progressive (1981–present) (Note: Affiliated non-member); House Democratic Caucus (1995–2007); Senate Democratic Caucus (2007–present); Democratic (2015–2016, 2019–2020)
- Spouses: Deborah Shiling (m. 1964; div. 1966); Jane O'Meara (m. 1988)
- Children: 1
- Relatives: Larry Sanders (brother); Carina Driscoll (step-daughter)
- Education: University of Chicago (BA)
- Website: Senate website; Campaign website
- Sanders's voice Sanders speaking against the Iraq War; Recorded October 9, 2002

Bernard Sanders (born September 8, 1941) is an American politician and activist serving as the senior United States senator from Vermont, a seat he has held since 2007. He is the longest-serving independent in U.S. congressional history, but maintains a close relationship with the Democratic Party, having caucused with House and Senate Democrats for most of his congressional career and sought the party's presidential nomination in 2016 and 2020. Ideologically a democratic socialist, Sanders is regarded as one of the leading figures of the 21st-century American progressive movement.

Born into a lower-middle-class family and raised in New York City, Sanders attended Brooklyn College before graduating from the University of Chicago in 1964. While a student, he was a protest organizer for the Congress of Racial Equality (CORE) and the Student Nonviolent Coordinating Committee (SNCC) during the civil rights movement. After settling in Vermont in 1968, he ran unsuccessful third-party political campaigns in the 1970s. He was elected mayor of Burlington in 1981 as an independent and was reelected three times.

Sanders was elected to the United States House of Representatives in 1990, representing Vermont's at-large congressional district. In 1991, he and five other House members co-founded the Congressional Progressive Caucus. Sanders was a U.S. representative for 16 years before being elected to the U.S. Senate in 2006, becoming the first non-Republican elected to Vermont's Class 1 seat since Solomon Foot, a Whig, in 1850. He was reelected in 2012, 2018, and 2024. Sanders also chaired the Senate Veterans' Affairs Committee from 2013 to 2015, the Senate Budget Committee from 2021 to 2023, and the Senate Health, Education, Labor and Pensions Committee from 2023 to 2025. He is the senior senator and dean of the Vermont congressional delegation.

Sanders was a candidate for the Democratic presidential nomination in 2016 and 2020, finishing second both times. His 2016 campaign generated enthusiasm and funding from small-dollar donors, helping him win 23 primaries and caucuses. In 2020, his strong showing in early primaries and caucuses made him the front-runner in a large field of Democratic candidates. He became a close ally of Joe Biden after the 2020 primaries. Since Donald Trump's non-consecutive reelection as president of the United States in 2024, Sanders has vocally opposed Trump's second administration and what he describes as a right-wing oligarchy, organizing rallies against Trump and his allies, especially Elon Musk, as part of an effort to reshape the Democratic Party.

Sanders is credited with influencing a leftward shift in the Democratic Party after his 2016 campaign. An advocate of progressive policies, he opposes neoliberalism and authoritarianism. He supports workers' self-management, universal and single-payer healthcare, paid parental leave, tuition-free tertiary education, a Green New Deal, and worker control of production through cooperatives, unions, and democratic public enterprises. On foreign policy, he supports reducing military spending, more diplomacy and international cooperation, and greater emphasis on labor rights and environmental concerns in negotiating international trade agreements. Sanders supports workplace democracy and has praised elements of the Nordic model. He is a member of the Fight Club in the Senate.

== Early life and education ==
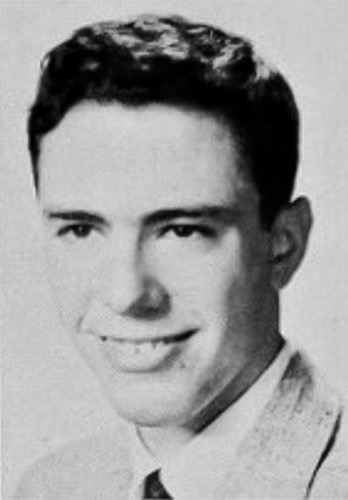
Sanders as a senior in high school, 1959

Bernard Sanders was born on September 8, 1941, in the New York City borough of Brooklyn. His father, Eliasz ben Yehuda Sanders, (Note: In this Jewish name, Eliasz is the given name, ben Yehuda the patronymic meaning "son of Yehuda", and Sanders the surname.) a Polish-Jewish immigrant, was born in Słopnice, a town in Austrian Galicia that was then part of the Austro-Hungarian Empire and is now in Poland. Elias Sanders immigrated to the United States in 1921 and became a paint salesman. Bernie's mother, Dorothy Sanders (née Glassberg), was born in New York City. Her parents immigrated to the United States from Radzyn, Poland, and Bialystock, Russia.

Sanders says he became interested in politics at an early age due to his family background. In the 1940s, many of his relatives in German-occupied Poland were murdered in the Holocaust.

Sanders lived in Midwood, Brooklyn. He attended elementary school at P.S. 197, where he won a borough championship on the basketball team. He attended Hebrew school in the afternoons and celebrated his bar mitzvah in 1954. His older brother Larry said that during their childhood, the family never lacked food or clothing, but major purchases, "like curtains or a rug", were not affordable.

Sanders attended James Madison High School, where he was captain of the track team and took third place in the New York City indoor one-mile race. In high school, he lost his first election, finishing last of three candidates for the student body presidency with a campaign that focused on aiding Korean War orphans. Despite the loss, he became active in his school's fundraising activities for Korean orphans, including organizing a charity basketball game. Sanders attended high school with economist Walter Block. When he was 19, his mother died at age 47, following failed cardiac surgery. His father died two years later, in 1962, at age 57.

Sanders studied at Brooklyn College for a year in 1959–1960 before transferring to the University of Chicago and graduating with a Bachelor of Arts degree in political science in 1964. In later interviews, Sanders described himself as a mediocre college student because the classroom was "boring and irrelevant" and said he viewed community activism as more important to his education.

== Early career ==
=== Political activism ===
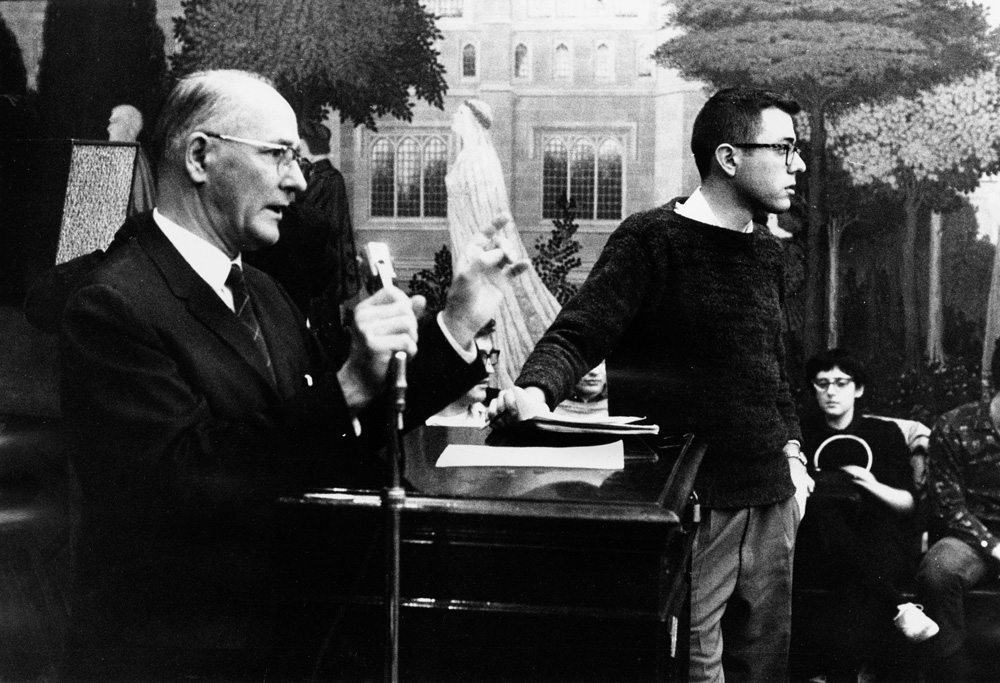
University of Chicago President George Beadle and Sanders at the CORE meeting on housing sit-ins in Ida Noyes Hall, February 1962

Sanders later described his time in Chicago as "the major period of intellectual ferment in my life." While there, he joined the Young People's Socialist League (the youth affiliate of the Socialist Party of America) and was active in the civil rights movement as a student for the Congress of Racial Equality (CORE) and the Student Nonviolent Coordinating Committee (SNCC). Under his chairmanship, the university chapter of CORE merged with the university chapter of the SNCC. In January 1962, he went to a rally at the University of Chicago administration building to protest university president George Wells Beadle's segregated campus housing policy. At the protest, Sanders said, "We feel it is an intolerable situation when Negro and white students of the university cannot live together in university-owned apartments." He and 32 other students then entered the building and camped outside the president's office. After weeks of sit-ins, Beadle and the university formed a commission to investigate discrimination. After further protests, the University of Chicago ended racial segregation in private university housing in the summer of 1963.

Joan Mahoney, a member of the University of Chicago CORE chapter at the time and a fellow participant in the sit-ins, described Sanders in a 2016 interview as "a swell guy, a nice Jewish boy from Brooklyn, but he wasn't terribly charismatic. One of his strengths, though, was his ability to work with a wide group of people, even those he didn't agree with." Sanders once spent a day putting up fliers protesting police brutality, only to notice later that Chicago police had shadowed him and taken them all down. He attended the 1963 March on Washington for Jobs and Freedom, where Martin Luther King Jr. gave the "I Have a Dream" speech. That summer, Sanders was fined $25 (equivalent to $263 in 2025) for resisting arrest during a demonstration in Englewood against segregation in Chicago's public schools.

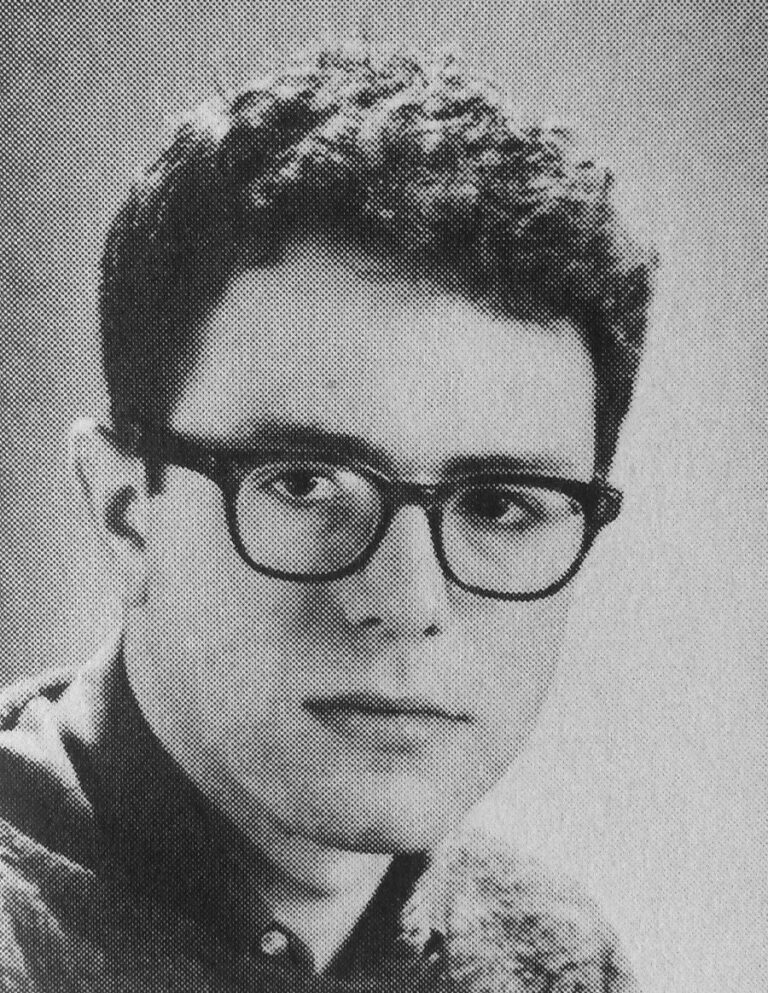
Sanders in the University of Chicago's 1964 yearbook

In addition to his civil rights activism during the 1960s and 1970s, Sanders was active in several peace and antiwar movements while attending the University of Chicago, becoming a member of the Student Peace Union. He applied for conscientious objector status during the Vietnam War; his application was eventually turned down, by which point he was too old to be drafted. Although he opposed the war, Sanders did not criticize those who fought in it and has strongly supported veterans' benefits throughout his political career. He was briefly an organizer with the United Packinghouse Workers of America while in Chicago. He also worked on the reelection campaign of Leon Despres, a prominent Chicago alderman who opposed then mayor Richard J. Daley's Democratic Party machine. Sanders said that he spent much of his student years reading history, sociology, psychology, and the works of political authors, from Thomas Jefferson, Abraham Lincoln, John Dewey, Karl Marx, and Erich Fromm—"reading everything except what I was supposed to read for class the next day."

=== Professional history and early years in Vermont ===
After graduating from college, Sanders returned to New York City, where he worked various jobs, including as a Head Start teacher, a psychiatric aide, and a carpenter. In 1968, he moved to Stannard, Vermont, a town small in both area and population (88 residents at the 1970 census) within Vermont's rural Northeast Kingdom region, because he had been "captivated by rural life". While there, he worked as a carpenter, filmmaker, and writer who created and sold "radical film strips" and other educational materials to schools. Sanders wrote articles for The Vermont Freeman. One article later received media attention during his national political career after its contents were rediscovered and reported in the press. He lived in the area for several years before moving to the more populous Chittenden County in the mid-1970s. During his 2018 reelection campaign, he returned to the town to hold an event with voters and other candidates.

=== Liberty Union campaigns ===
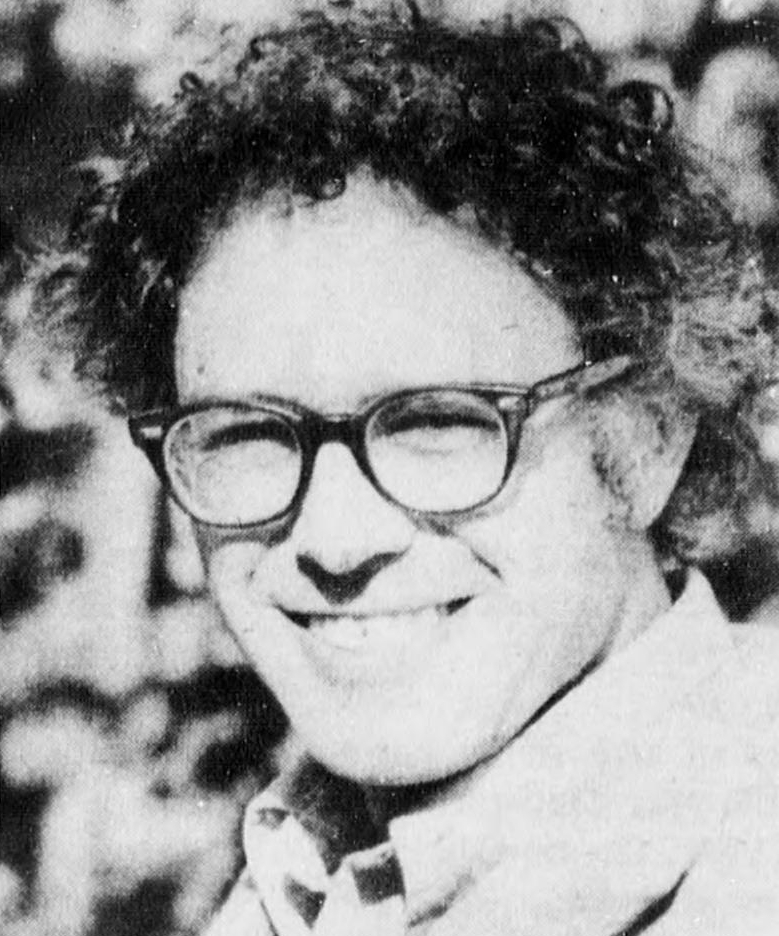
Sanders as candidate for Governor of Vermont, 1976

From 1969 to 1971, Sanders resided in Montpelier. After moving to Burlington, he began his electoral political career as a member of the Liberty Union Party, a national umbrella party for various socialist-oriented state parties, originating in the anti-war movement and the People's Party. He ran as the Liberty Union candidate for governor of Vermont in 1972 and 1976 and as a candidate in the special election for U.S. senator in 1972 and in the general election in 1974. In the 1974 senatorial race, he finished third (5,901 votes; 4%), behind 34-year-old Chittenden County state's attorney Patrick Leahy (D; 70,629 votes; 49%) and two-term incumbent U.S. Representative Dick Mallary (R; 66,223 votes; 46%).

In 1971, while researching an article for Liberty Union's newspaper Movement, Sanders stayed at Myrtle Hill Farm, a Vermont back to the land commune. He was asked to leave after three days for failing to contribute physical labor expected of all members. Some residents complained that Sanders spent his time engaging others in political discussions, distracting them from their work, with one member claiming the only way "any work was going to get accomplished" was if people were pulled out of Sanders's orbit.

The 1976 campaign was the zenith of the Liberty Union's influence, with Sanders collecting 11,317 votes for governor and the party. His strong performance forced the down-ballot races for lieutenant governor and secretary of state to be decided by the state legislature when its vote total prevented either the Republican or Democratic candidate for those offices from garnering a majority of votes. But the campaign drained the Liberty Union's finances and energy, and in October 1977, Sanders and the Liberty Union candidate for attorney general, Nancy Kaufman, announced their retirement from the party. During the 1980 presidential election, Sanders was one of three electors for the Socialist Workers Party in Vermont.

After resigning from the Liberty Union Party in 1977, Sanders worked as a writer and as the director of the nonprofit American People's Historical Society (APHS). While with the APHS, he produced a 30-minute documentary about American labor leader Eugene V. Debs, who ran for president five times as the Socialist Party candidate. On October 25, 2025, the Eugene V. Debs Foundation gave Sanders its namesake award, first given to John L. Lewis in 1965.

== Mayor of Burlington, Vermont (1981–1989) ==
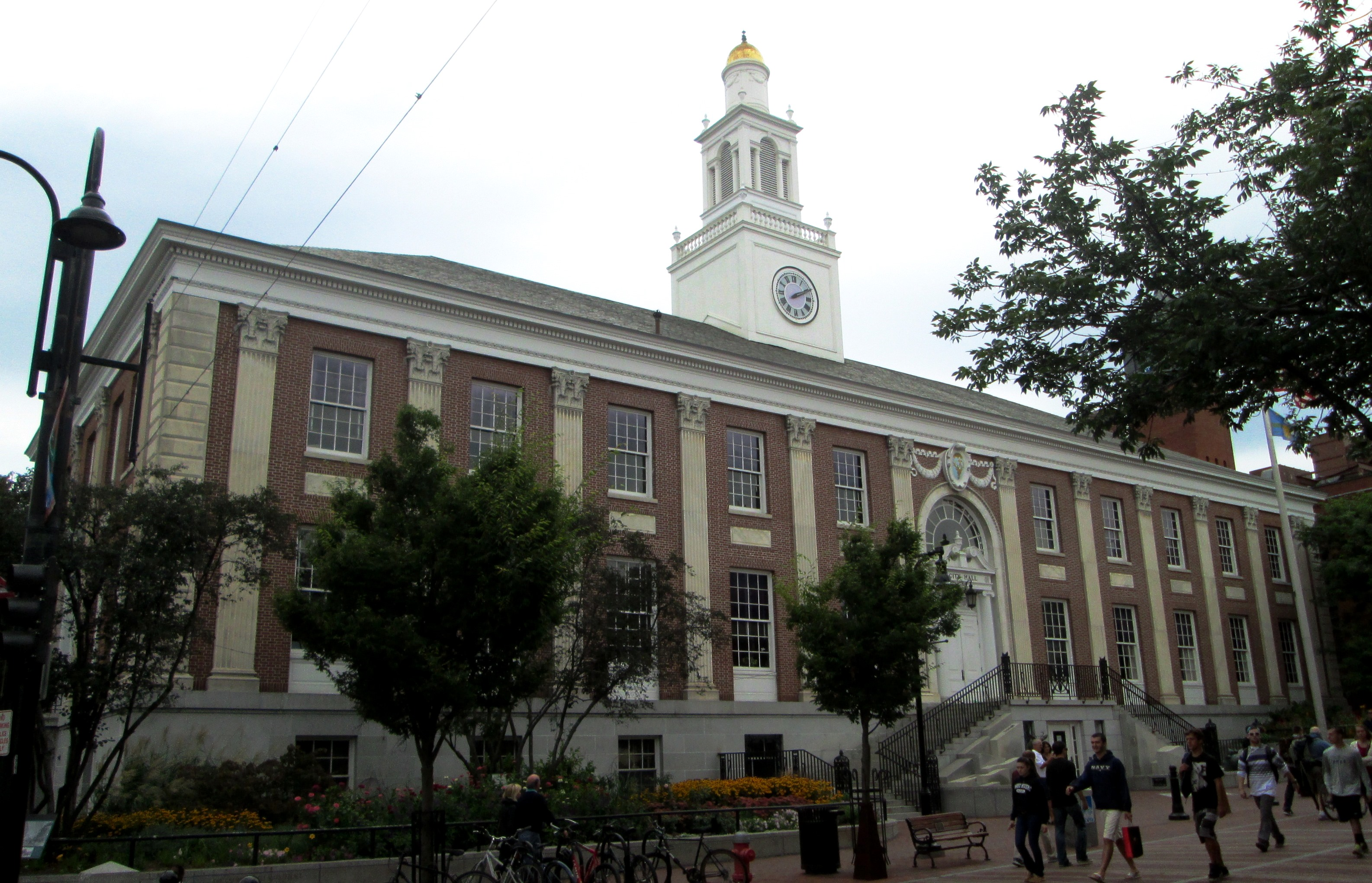
Burlington City Hall

=== Campaigns ===
On November 8, 1980, Sanders announced his candidacy for mayor. He formally announced his campaign on December 16 at a City Hall press conference. Sanders selected Linda Niedweske as his campaign manager. The Citizens Party attempted to nominate Greg Guma for mayor, but Guma declined, saying it would be "difficult to run against another progressive candidate". Sanders had been convinced to run for the mayoralty by his close friend Richard Sugarman, an Orthodox Jewish professor of religious studies at the University of Vermont, who had shown him a ward-by-ward breakdown of the 1976 Vermont gubernatorial election, in which Sanders had run, that showed him receiving 12% of the vote in Burlington despite only getting 6% statewide.

Sanders initially won the mayoral election by 22 votes against incumbent mayor Gordon Paquette, Richard Bove, and Joseph McGrath, but the margin was later reduced to 10 votes. Paquette did not contest the results of the recount.

Paquette did not campaign or promote his candidacy since neither Sanders nor Bove was seen as a serious challenger. Sanders had not previously won an election. Paquette was also considered to have lost because he proposed an unpopular $0.65 per $100 raise in taxes that Sanders opposed. Sanders spent around $4,000 on his campaign.

Sanders criticized the pro-development incumbent as an ally of prominent shopping center developer Antonio Pomerleau, while Paquette warned of ruin for Burlington if Sanders were elected. The Sanders campaign was bolstered by a wave of optimistic volunteers as well as a series of endorsements from university professors, social welfare agencies, and the police union. The result shocked the local political establishment.

Sanders formed a coalition of independents and the Citizens Party. On December 3, 1982, he announced that he would seek reelection. On January 22, 1983, the Citizens Party voted unanimously to endorse Sanders, although Sanders ran as an independent. He was reelected, defeating Judy Stephany and James Gilson.

Sanders initially considered not seeking a third term, but announced on December 5, 1984, that he would run. He formally launched his campaign on December 7 and was reelected. On December 1, 1986, Sanders, who had finished third in the 1986 Vermont gubernatorial election, announced that he would seek reelection to a fourth term as mayor of Burlington, despite close associates saying that he was tired of being mayor. Sanders defeated Democratic nominee Paul Lafayette in the election. He said he would not seek another mayoral term after the 1987 election: "eight years is enough and I think it is time for new leadership, which does exist within the coalition, to come up".

Sanders did not run for a fifth term as mayor. He went on to lecture in political science at Harvard Kennedy School that year and at Hamilton College in 1991.

=== Administration ===
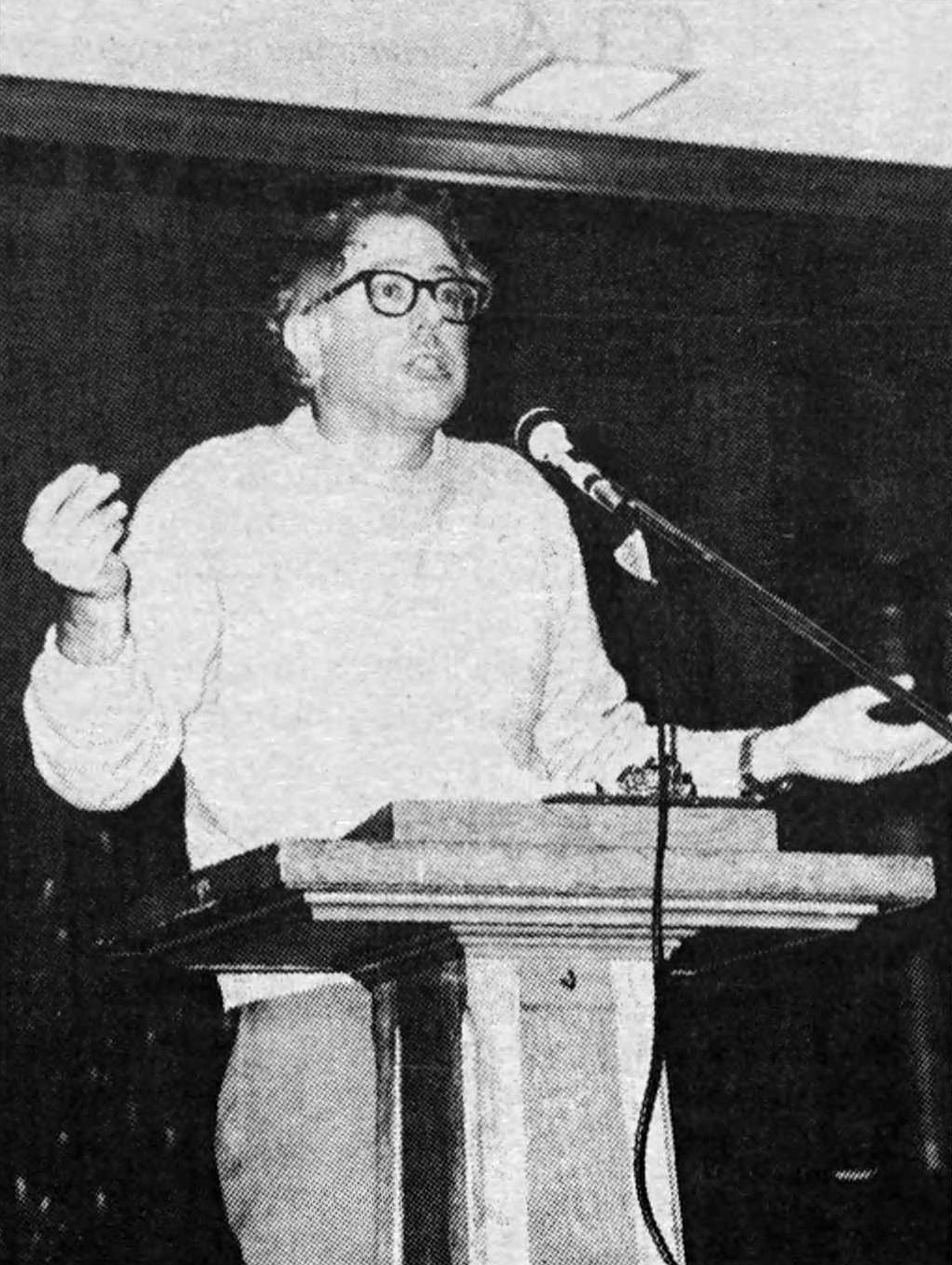
Sanders speaking at an anti-nuclear symposium at the University of Vermont, November 11, 1982

During his mayoralty, Sanders called himself a socialist and was described as such in the press. During his first term, his supporters, including the first Citizens Party city councilor Terry Bouricius, formed the Progressive Coalition, the forerunner of the Vermont Progressive Party. The Progressives never held more than six seats on the 13-member city council, but they had enough to keep the council from overriding Sanders's vetoes. Under his leadership, Burlington balanced its city budget; attracted a minor league baseball team, the Vermont Reds, then the Double-A affiliate of the Cincinnati Reds; became the first US city to fund community-trust housing; and successfully sued the local cable television franchise, thereby winning reduced rates for customers.

Sanders led downtown revitalization projects, including the improvement of Burlington's Lake Champlain waterfront. In 1981, he campaigned against the unpopular plans by Burlington developer Tony Pomerleau to convert the then-industrial waterfront property owned by the Central Vermont Railway into expensive condominiums, hotels, and offices. He ran under the slogan "Burlington is not for sale" and successfully supported a plan that redeveloped the waterfront area into a mixed-use district featuring housing, parks, and public spaces.

Sanders was a consistent critic of US foreign policy in Latin America throughout the 1980s. In 1985, Burlington City Hall hosted a foreign policy speech by Noam Chomsky. In his introduction, he praised Chomsky as "a very vocal and important voice in the wilderness of intellectual life in America" and said that he was "delighted to welcome a person who I think we're all very proud of".

Sanders hosted and produced a public-access television program, Bernie Speaks with the Community, from 1986 to 1988. He collaborated with 30 Vermont musicians to record a folk album, We Shall Overcome, in 1987. That same year, US News & World Report ranked Sanders one of America's best mayors. As of 2013, Burlington was regarded as one of the most livable cities in the United States.

During a trip to the Soviet Union in 1988, Sanders interviewed the mayor of Burlington's sister city Yaroslavl about housing and health care issues in the two cities.

When Sanders left office in 1989, Bouricius, a member of the Burlington city council, said that Sanders had "changed the entire nature of politics in Burlington and also in the state of Vermont".

== U.S. House of Representatives (1991–2007) ==
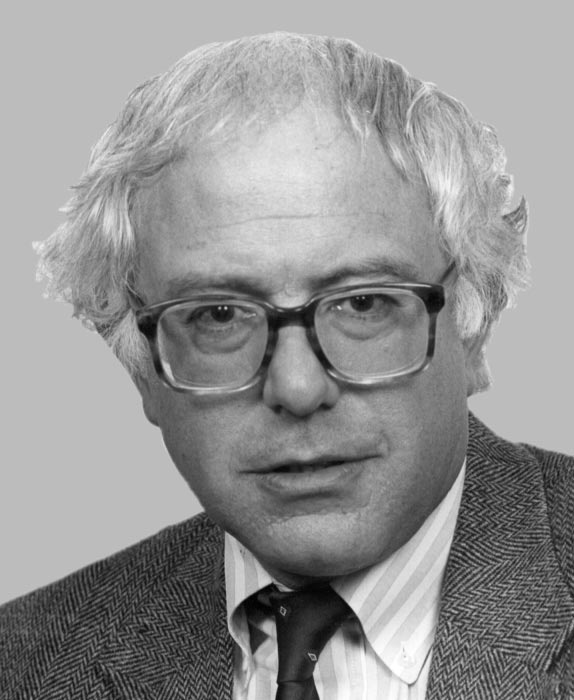
Sanders's first congressional portrait photograph, 1991

=== Elections ===
In 1988, incumbent Republican congressman Jim Jeffords decided to run for the U.S. Senate, vacating the House seat representing Vermont's at-large congressional district. Former lieutenant governor Peter P. Smith won the House election with a plurality, securing 41% of the vote. Sanders, who ran as an independent, placed second with 38% of the vote, while Democratic state representative Paul N. Poirier placed third with 19%. Two years later, he ran for the seat again and defeated Smith by a margin of 56% to 39%. Sanders was the first independent elected to the U.S. House of Representatives since Frazier Reams of Ohio won his second term in 1952, as well as the first socialist elected to the House since Vito Marcantonio, from the American Labor Party, who won his last term in 1948. Sanders was a representative from 1991 until he became a senator in 2007, winning reelection by large margins except during the 1994 Republican Revolution, when he won by 3%, with 50% of the vote.

=== Legislation ===
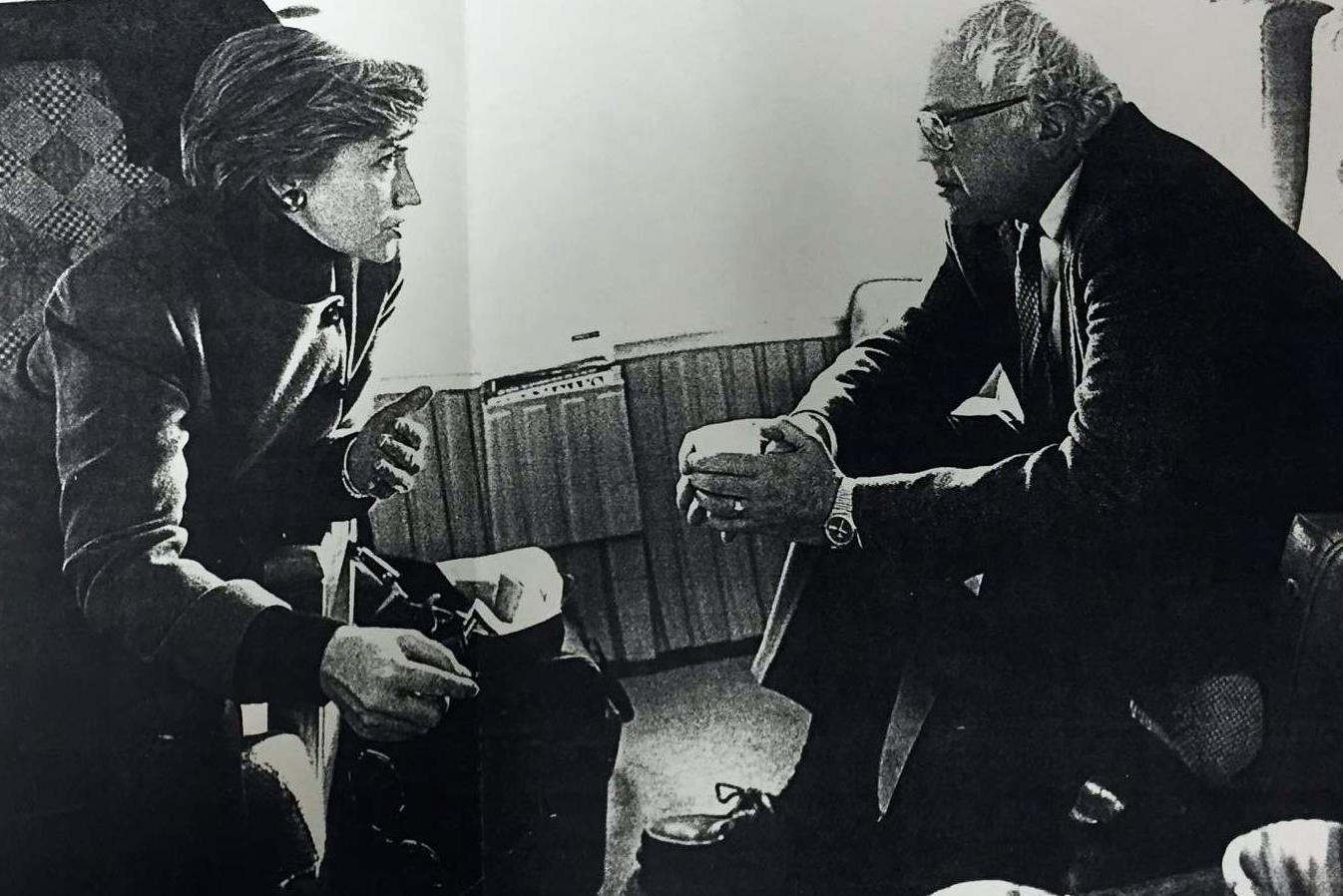
Sanders meeting in 1993 with First Lady Hillary Clinton to discuss her plan to reform the healthcare system

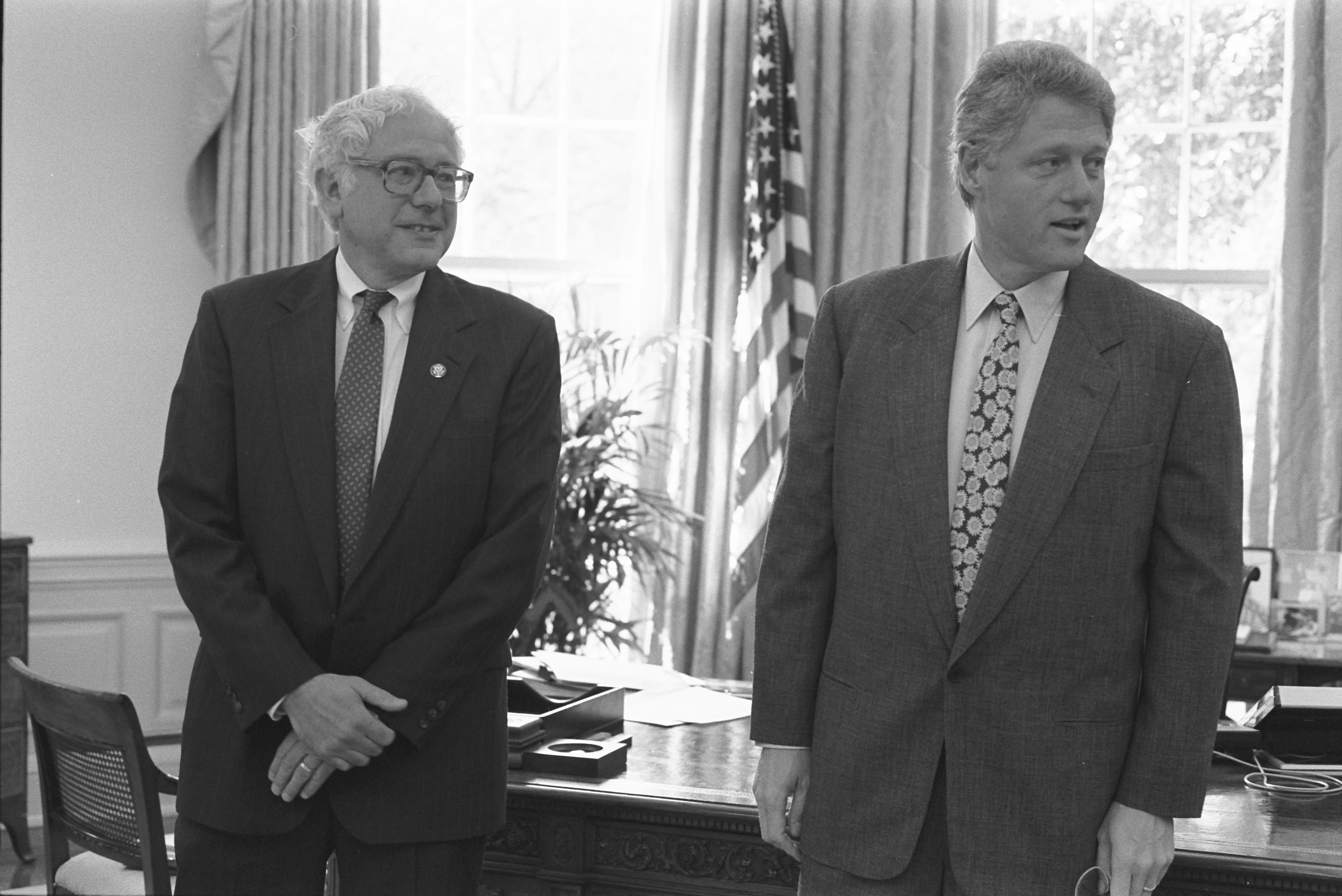
Sanders with then-president Clinton in 1993

During his first year in the House, Sanders often alienated allies and colleagues with his criticism of both political parties as working primarily on behalf of the wealthy. In 1991, he co-founded the Congressional Progressive Caucus, a group of mostly liberal Democrats that he chaired for its first eight years, while still refusing to join the Democratic Party or caucus.

In 2005, Rolling Stone called Sanders the "amendment king" for his ability to get more roll call amendments passed than any other congressman during the period since 1995, when Congress was entirely under Republican control. Being an independent allowed him to form coalitions across party lines.

==== Banking reform ====
In 1999, Sanders voted and advocated against rolling back the Glass–Steagall legislation provisions that kept investment banks and commercial banks separate entities. He was a vocal critic of Federal Reserve chair Alan Greenspan; in June 2003, during a question-and-answer discussion, Sanders told him he was concerned that he was "way out of touch" and "that you see your major function in your position as the need to represent the wealthy and large corporations."

==== Cancer registries ====
Concerned by high breast cancer rates in Vermont, on February 7, 1992, Sanders sponsored the Cancer Registries Amendment Act to establish cancer registries to collect data on cancer. Senator Patrick Leahy introduced a companion bill in the Senate on October 2, 1992. The Senate bill was passed by the House on October 6 and signed into law by President George H. W. Bush on October 24, 1992.

==== Firearms and criminal justice ====
In 1993, Sanders voted against the Brady Bill, which mandated federal background checks when buying guns and imposed a waiting period on firearm purchasers in the United States; the bill passed by a vote of 238–187. He voted against the bill four more times in the 1990s, explaining that his Vermont constituents saw waiting-period mandates as more appropriately a state rather than a federal matter.

Sanders did vote for other gun-control measures. For example, in 1994, he voted for the Violent Crime Control and Law Enforcement Act "because it included the Violence Against Women Act and the ban on certain assault weapons." He was nevertheless critical of the other parts of the bill. Although he acknowledged that "clearly, there are some people in our society who are horribly violent, who are deeply sick and sociopathic, and clearly these people must be put behind bars in order to protect society from them", he maintained that governmental policies played a large part in "dooming tens of millions of young people to a future of bitterness, misery, hopelessness, drugs, crime, and violence" and argued that the repressive policies introduced by the bill were not addressing the causes of violence, saying, "we can create meaningful jobs, rebuilding our society, or we can build more jails."

Sanders has at times favored stronger law enforcement and sentencing. In 1996, he voted against a bill that would have prohibited police from purchasing tanks and armored carriers. In 1998, he voted for a bill that would have increased minimum sentencing for possessing a gun while committing a federal crime to ten years in prison, including nonviolent crimes such as marijuana possession.

In 2005, Sanders voted for the Protection of Lawful Commerce in Arms Act. The purpose of the act was to prevent firearms manufacturers and dealers from being held liable for negligence when crimes have been committed with their products. As of 2016, he said that he has since changed his position and would vote for legislation to defeat this bill.

==== Opposition to the Patriot Act ====
Sanders was a consistent critic of the Patriot Act. As a member of the House, he voted against the original Patriot Act legislation. After its 357–66 passage in the House, he sponsored and voted for several subsequent amendments and acts attempting to curtail its effects and voted against each reauthorization. In June 2005, he proposed an amendment to limit Patriot Act provisions that allow the government to obtain individuals' library and book-buying records. The amendment passed the House by a bipartisan majority but was removed on November 4 of that year in House–Senate negotiations and never became law.

==== Opposition to the War in Iraq ====
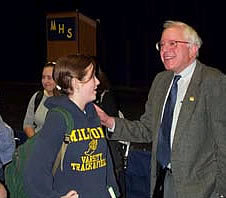
Sanders meeting with students at Milton High School in Milton, Vermont, 2004

Sanders voted against the resolutions authorizing the use of force against Iraq in 1991 and 2002, and he opposed the 2003 invasion of Iraq. He voted for the 2001 Authorization for Use of Military Force Against Terrorists that has been cited as the legal justification for controversial military actions since the September 11 attacks. He especially opposed the Bush administration's decision to start a war unilaterally.

==== Trade policy ====
In February 2005, Sanders introduced a bill that would have withdrawn the permanent normal trade relations (PNTR) status that had been extended to China in October 2000. He said to the House, "Anyone who takes an objective look at our trade policy with China must conclude that it is an absolute failure and needs to be fundamentally overhauled", citing the American jobs being lost to overseas competitors. His bill received 71 co-sponsors but was not sent to the floor for a vote.

== U.S. Senate (2007–present) ==
=== Elections ===
==== 2006 ====
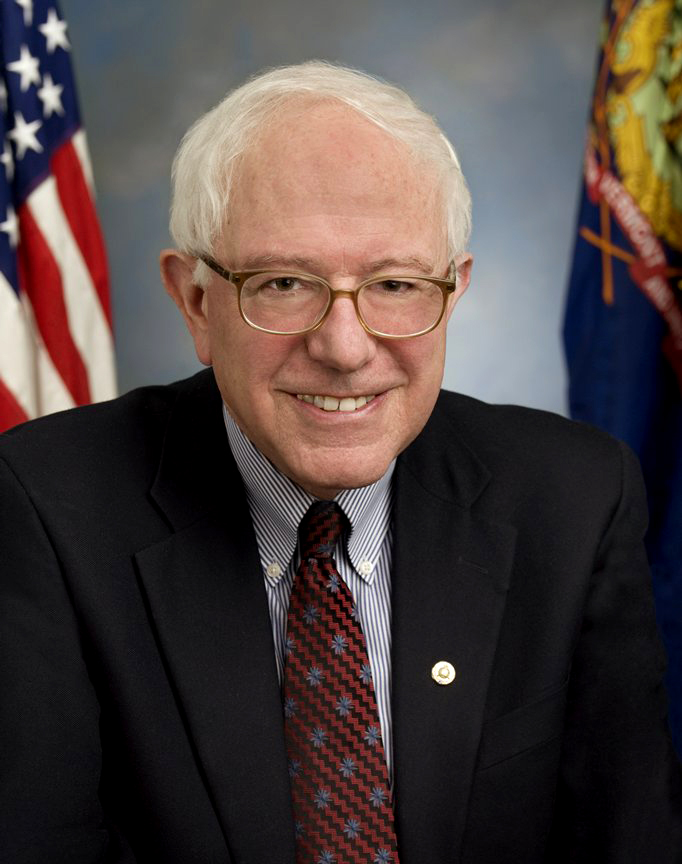
Senate portrait, 2007

Sanders entered the race for the U.S. Senate on April 21, 2005, after Senator Jim Jeffords announced that he would not seek a fourth term. Chuck Schumer, chair of the Democratic Senatorial Campaign Committee and fellow James Madison High School alumnus, endorsed Sanders. This was a critical move because it meant no Democrat running against him could expect financial help from the party. He was also endorsed by Senate minority leader Harry Reid and Democratic National Committee chair and former Vermont governor Howard Dean. Dean said in May 2005 that he considered Sanders an ally who "votes with the Democrats 98% of the time". Then-Senator Barack Obama also campaigned for him in Vermont in March 2006. Sanders entered into an agreement with the Democratic Party, much as he had as a congressman, to be listed in their primary but to decline the nomination should he win, which he did.

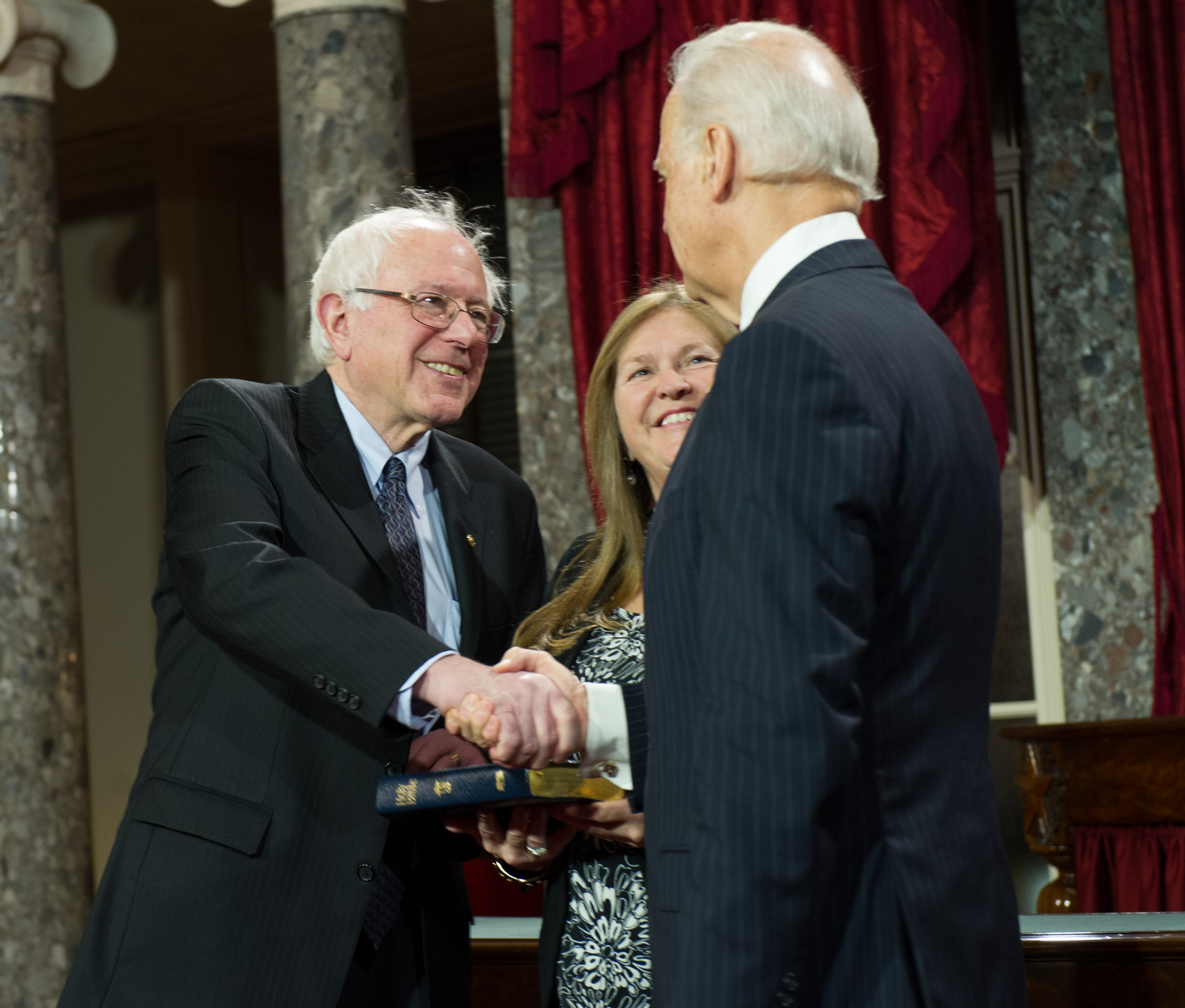
Sanders being sworn in for his second term in 2013 by Vice President Joe Biden

In the most expensive political campaign in Vermont's history, Sanders defeated businessman Rich Tarrant by an almost 2-to-1 margin. Many national media outlets projected him as the winner just after the polls closed, before any returns came in.

==== 2012 ====
Sanders was reelected in 2012 with 71% of the vote, defeating Republican nominee John MacGovern.

==== 2018 ====
Sanders was reelected in 2018 with 67% of the vote, defeating real estate broker and Republican nominee Lawrence Zupan.

==== 2024 ====
On May 6, 2024, Sanders announced his candidacy for a fourth Senate term. A poll just a few weeks earlier found that more than half of respondents wanted him to seek reelection. Sanders faced Republican nominee Gerald Malloy, who ran against Senator Peter Welch in 2022. Sanders was reelected and has said this term will likely be his last.

=== Legislation ===
While a member of Congress, Sanders sponsored 15 concurrent resolutions and 15 Senate resolutions. Of those he co-sponsored, 218 became law. While he has consistently advocated for progressive causes, Politico wrote that he has "rarely forged actual legislation or left a significant imprint on it". According to The New York Times, "Big legislation largely eludes Mr. Sanders because his ideas are usually far to the left of the majority of the Senate ... Mr. Sanders has largely found ways to press his agenda through appending small provisions to the larger bills of others." During his time in the Senate, he had lower legislative effectiveness than the average senator, as measured by the number of sponsored bills that passed and successful amendments made. Nevertheless, he has sponsored over 500 amendments to bills, many of which became law. The results of these amendments include a ban on imported goods made by child labor; $100 million in funding for community health centers; $10 million for an outreach program for servicemembers who have post-traumatic stress disorder, traumatic brain injury, depression, panic attacks, and other mental disorders; a public database of senior Department of Defense officials seeking employment with defense contractors; and including autism treatment under the military healthcare program Tricare.

In August 2022, Sanders voted for the Inflation Reduction Act of 2022. He was not satisfied with the bill, calling it only a small step forward. Sanders joined with Democrats to pass the Inflation Reduction Act, which capped the cost of insulin for seniors on Medicare to $35 a month and allowed Medicare to negotiate lower drug prices.

==== Finance and monetary policy ====
In 2008 and 2009, Sanders voted against the Troubled Asset Relief Program (TARP), a program to purchase toxic banking assets and provide loans to banks that were in free-fall. On February 4, 2009, he sponsored an amendment to ensure that TARP funds would not displace US workers. The amendment passed and was added to the American Recovery and Reinvestment Act of 2009. Among his proposed financial reforms is auditing the Federal Reserve, which would reduce its independence in monetary policy deliberations; Federal Reserve officials say that "Audit the Fed" legislation would expose the Federal Reserve to undue political pressure from lawmakers who do not like its decisions.

Sanders spoke for more than eight hours in his December 2010 filibuster.

On December 10, 2010, Sanders delivered an 8-hour and 34-minute speech against the Tax Relief, Unemployment Insurance Reauthorization, and Job Creation Act of 2010, (Note: A long speech such as this is commonly known as a filibuster, but because it did not block action, it was not technically a filibuster under Senate rules.) which proposed extending the Bush-era tax rates. He argued that the legislation would favor the wealthiest Americans. "Enough is enough! ... How many homes can you own?" he asked. Nevertheless, the bill passed the Senate with a strong majority and was signed into law a week later. In February 2011, Nation Books published the speech as The Speech: A Historic Filibuster on Corporate Greed and the Decline of Our Middle Class, with authorial proceeds going to Vermont nonprofit charitable organizations.

In 2016, Sanders voted for the Federal Reserve Transparency Act, which included proposals for a reformed audit of the Federal Reserve System.

==== Foreign policy ====
On June 12, 2017, U.S. senators agreed to legislation imposing new sanctions on Russia and Iran. The bill was opposed only by Sanders and Republican Rand Paul. He supported the sanctions on Russia, but voted against the bill because he believed the sanctions could endanger the Iran nuclear deal.

In 2018, Sanders sponsored a bill and was joined by senators Chris Murphy (D–CT) and Mike Lee (R–UT) to invoke the 1973 War Powers Resolution to end US support for the Saudi-led military intervention in Yemen, which has resulted in hundreds of thousands of civilian casualties and "millions more suffering from starvation and disease". After the assassination of Jamal Khashoggi in October 2018 (which was ordered by Saudi Arabian crown prince Mohammad bin Salman, according to multiple intelligence agencies), his bill attracted bipartisan co-sponsors and support, and the Senate passed it by a vote of 56–41. The bill passed the House in February 2019 by a 247–175 vote and President Trump vetoed it in March, saying: "This resolution is an unnecessary, dangerous attempt to weaken my constitutional authorities, endangering the lives of American citizens and brave service members, both today and in the future."

During the Gaza war, Sanders introduced several Joint Resolutions of Disapproval to block arms to Israel. All failed, but some Democrats voted for them. In November 2024, one such resolution garnered support from 18 senators. In April 2025, 15 senators supported another. In July 2025, 27 senators supported a resolution, a majority of Senate Democrats.

==== Health care ====
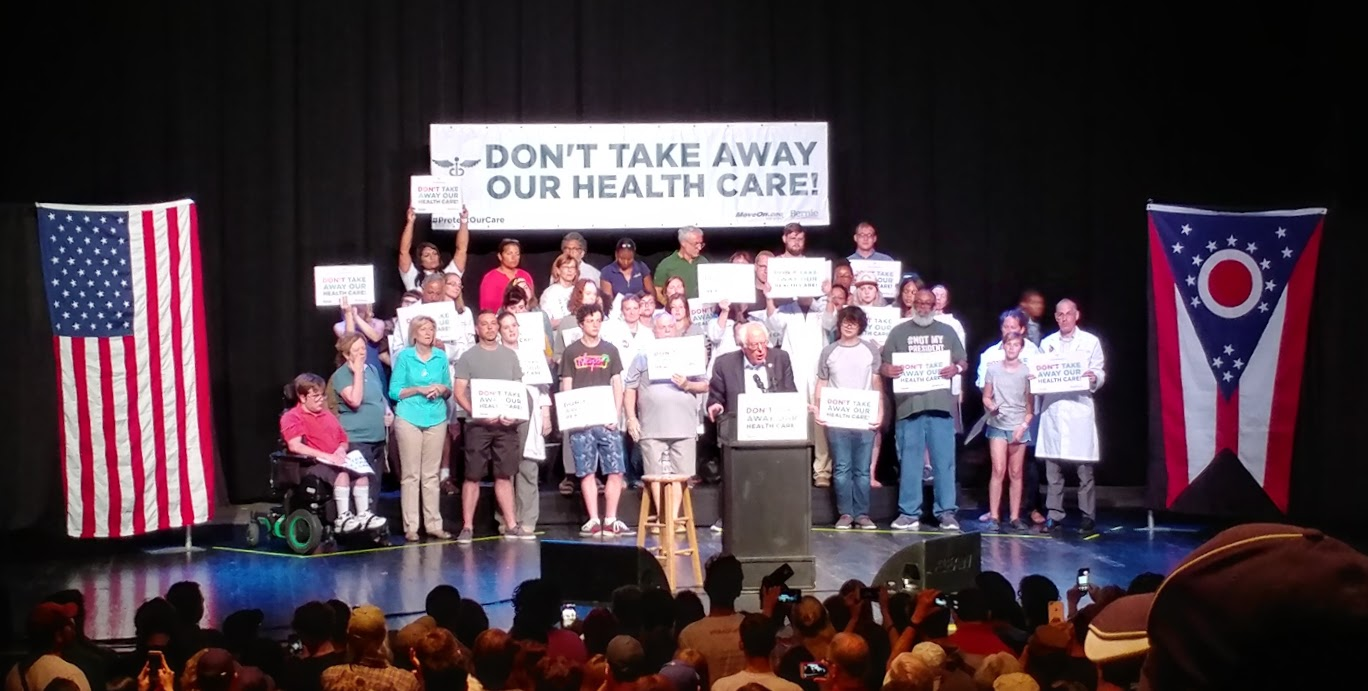
Don't Take Our Health Care rally in Columbus, Ohio, June 2017

Sanders debating HHS Secretary Robert F. Kennedy Jr. over the American Medical Association, September 2025

In mid-December 2009, Sanders successfully added a provision to the Affordable Care Act to fund $11 billion to community health centers, especially those in rural areas. The provision brought together Democrats on the left with Democrats from conservative, rural areas, helping to secure the 60 votes needed for passage. On May 4, 2017, in response to the House vote to repeal and replace the Affordable Care Act, he predicted "thousands of Americans would die" from no longer having access to health care. PolitiFact rated his statement "mostly true".

In September 2017, Sanders along with 15 Senate co-sponsors submitted the Medicare for All bill, a single-payer healthcare plan. The bill covers vision and dental care, unlike Medicare. Some Republicans have called the bill "Berniecare" and "the latest Democratic push for socialized medicine and higher taxes." He responded that the Republican Party has no credibility on the issue of health care after voting for legislation that would take health insurance away from 32 million Americans under the Affordable Care Act.

As chairman of the Senate Subcommittee on Primary Health and Aging, Sanders introduced legislation in 2013 to reauthorize and strengthen the Older Americans Act, which supports Meals on Wheels and other programs for seniors.

==== Immigration policy ====
In 2007, Sanders helped kill a bill introducing comprehensive immigration reform, arguing that its guest-worker program would depress wages for American workers. In 2010, he supported the DREAM Act, which would have provided a path to citizenship for undocumented immigrants who had been brought to the United States as minors. In 2013, he supported the Gang of Eight's comprehensive immigration reform bill after securing a $1.5 billion youth jobs program provision, which he argued would offset the harm of labor market competition with immigrants. In a March 2025 interview, Sanders said that Biden failed to properly curb illegal immigration and commended Trump for strengthening border immigration policies, adding, "nobody thinks illegal immigration is appropriate", while also criticizing mass deportations and calling for comprehensive immigration reform.

==== Income and wealth distribution ====
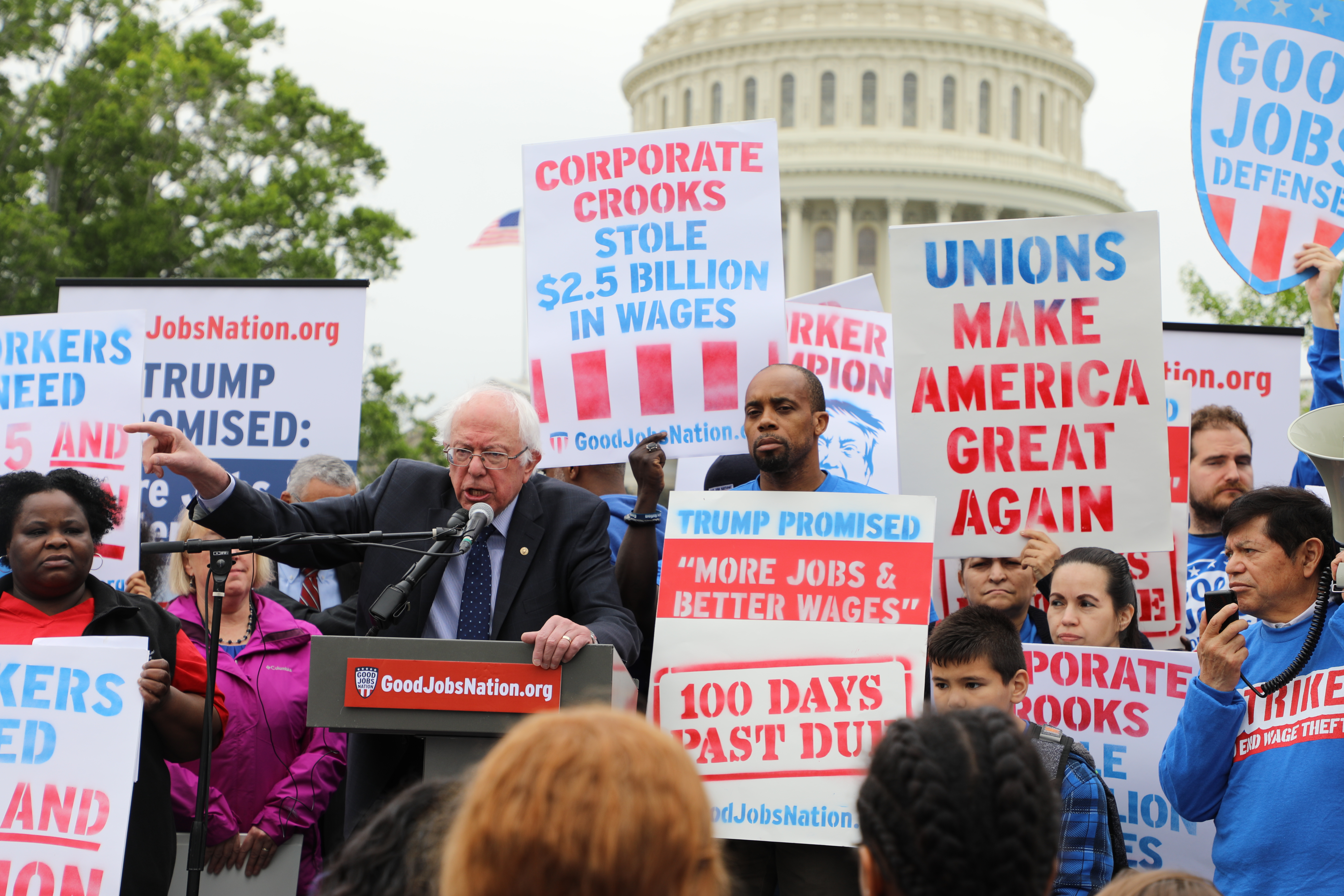
Sanders introduced legislation to raise the federal minimum wage to $15 an hour in April 2017.

In April 2017, Sanders introduced a bill that would raise the minimum wage for federal contract workers to $15 an hour, an increase over an earlier Democratic $12 an hour proposal. On May 9, 2018, he introduced the Workplace Democracy Act, a bill that would expand labor rights by making it easier for workers to join a union, ban right-to-work laws and some anti-union provisions of the Taft–Hartley Act, and outlaw some union-busting tactics. Announcing the legislation, he said, "If we are serious about reducing income and wealth inequality and rebuilding the middle class, we have got to substantially increase the number of union jobs in this country."

Sanders opposed the 2018 United States federal budget proposed by the Trump administration, calling it "a budget for the billionaire class, for Wall Street, for corporate CEOs, and for the wealthiest people in this country... nothing less than a massive transfer of wealth from working families, the elderly, children, the sick and the poor to the top 1%."

After the November 2017 revelations from the Paradise Papers and a recent report from the Institute for Policy Studies which says just three people (Jeff Bezos, Bill Gates, and Warren Buffett) own more wealth than the bottom half of the U.S. population, Sanders stated that "we must end global oligarchy" and that "we need, in the United States and throughout the world, a tax system which is fair, progressive and transparent."

On September 5, 2018, Sanders partnered with Ro Khanna to introduce the Stop Bad Employers by Zeroing Out Subsidies (Stop BEZOS) Act, which would require large corporations to pay for the food stamps and Medicaid benefits that their employees receive, relieving the burden on taxpayers.

==== Veterans affairs ====
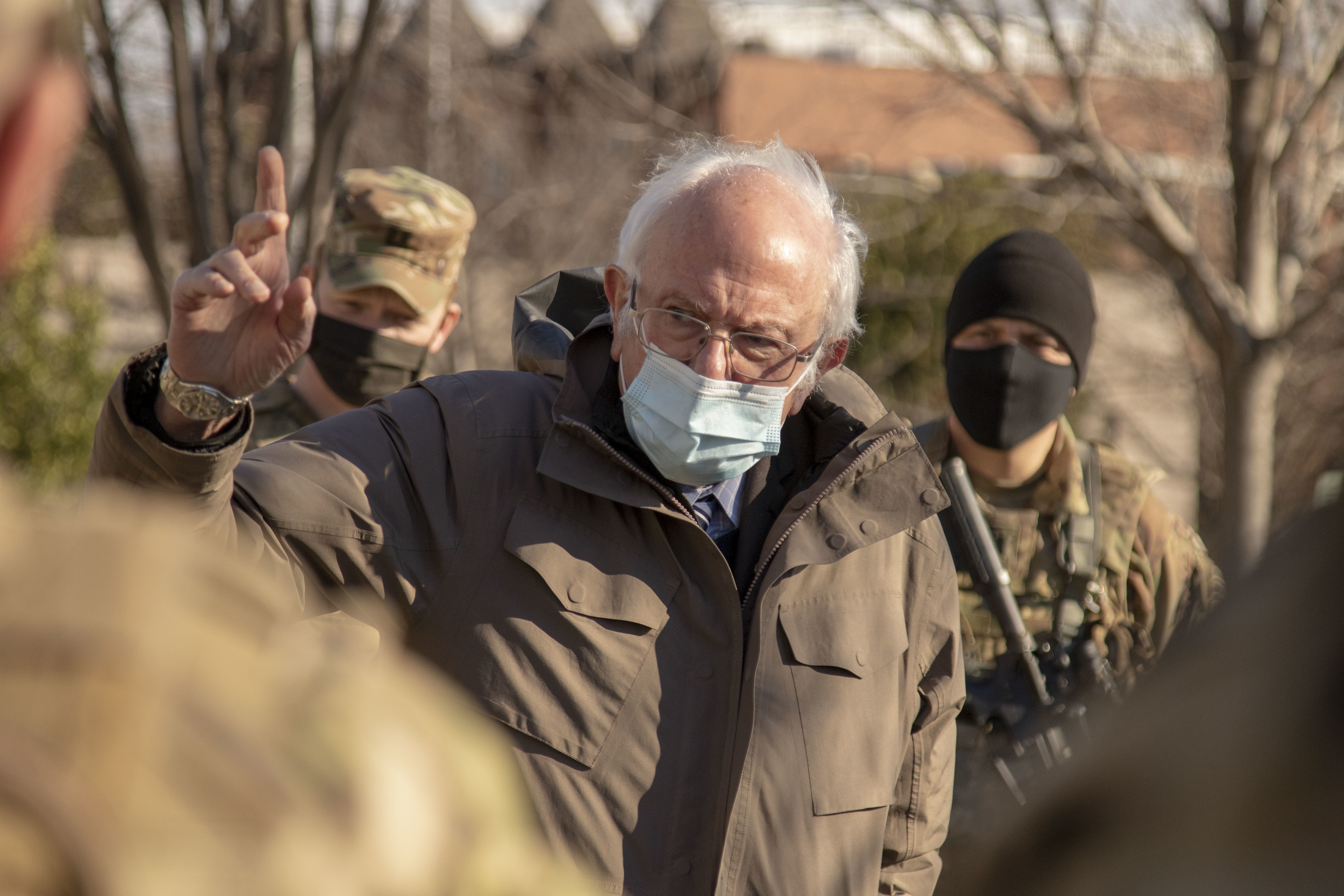
Sanders speaking to members of the Vermont Army National Guard sent to Washington, D.C. as security preparations for the inauguration of Joe Biden in 2021

On June 9, 2014, Sanders sponsored the Veterans' Access to Care through Choice, Accountability, and Transparency Act of 2014 to reform the Department of Veterans Affairs in the wake of the Veterans Health Administration scandal of 2014. He worked with Senator John McCain, who co-sponsored the bill. His bill was incorporated into the House version of the bill, which passed both chambers on July 31, 2014, and was signed into law by President Obama on August 7, 2014.

=== Supreme Court nominees ===
On March 17, 2016, Sanders said he would support Merrick Garland's nomination to the Supreme Court, though he added, "there are some more progressive judges out there." He opposed Neil Gorsuch's nomination to the court, saying that Gorsuch had "refused to answer legitimate questions". He also objected to Senate Republicans' use of the nuclear option to "choke off debate and ram [Gorsuch's] nomination through the Senate". He voted against Gorsuch's confirmation as an associate justice and against Trump's nominees Brett Kavanaugh and Amy Coney Barrett. In 2022, Sanders voted to confirm Joe Biden's nominee Ketanji Brown Jackson to the Supreme Court.

=== Committee assignments ===
As an independent, Sanders maintains an agreement with the Senate Democratic leadership where he votes with the Democrats on all procedural matters unless the Democratic whip, Dick Durbin, agrees that he need not (a request rarely made or granted). In return he was allowed to keep his seniority and received the committee seats that would have been available to him as a Democrat; in 2013–14 he was chairman of the United States Senate Committee on Veterans' Affairs (during the Veterans Health Administration scandal).

Sanders became the ranking minority member on the Senate Budget Committee in 2015 and the chair in 2021; he previously chaired the Senate Veterans' Affairs Committee for two years. Since 2017, he has been chair of the Senate Democratic Outreach Committee. He appointed economics professor Stephanie Kelton, a modern monetary theory scholar, as the chief economic adviser for the committee's Democratic minority and presented a report about helping "rebuild the disappearing middle class" that included proposals to raise the minimum wage, boost infrastructure spending, and increase Social Security payments.

=== 119th United States Congress Committee Assignments ===
- Committee on the Budget
- Committee on Environment and Public Works
- Committee on Finance
- Committee on Health, Education, Labor, and Pensions (ranking member)
- Committee on Veterans' Affairs

=== Caucus memberships ===
Sanders was only the third senator from Vermont to caucus with the Democrats, after Jeffords and Leahy. His caucusing with the Democrats gave them a 51–49 majority in the Senate during the 110th Congress in 2007–08. The Democrats needed 51 seats to control the Senate because Vice President Dick Cheney would likely have broken potential ties in favor of the Republicans. He is a member of the following caucuses:

- Congressional Progressive Caucus
- Democratic Caucus of the United States Senate
- United States Senate Afterschool Caucus

=== Approval ratings ===
Polling conducted in August 2011 by Public Policy Polling found that Sanders's approval rating was 67% and his disapproval rating 28%, making him then the third-most popular US senator. Both the NAACP (National Association for the Advancement of Colored People) and the NHLA (National Hispanic Leadership Agenda) have given him 100% voting scores during his tenure in the Senate. In 2015, he was named one of the Top 5 of The Forward 50. In a November 2015 Morning Consult poll, he reached an 83% approval rating among his constituents, making him the most popular US senator. As of 2026, polling by the Morning Consult found Sanders was still the most popular U.S. senator, with 68% approval among Vermont voters. In March 2017, Fox News found him to have the highest net favorability of any prominent politician included in its poll, at +28 points. He ranked third in 2014 and first in both 2015 and 2016.

In April 2017, a nationwide Harvard-Harris Poll found that Sanders had the highest favorability rating of any political figure included in the poll, a standing confirmed by subsequent polling.

== 2016 presidential campaign ==
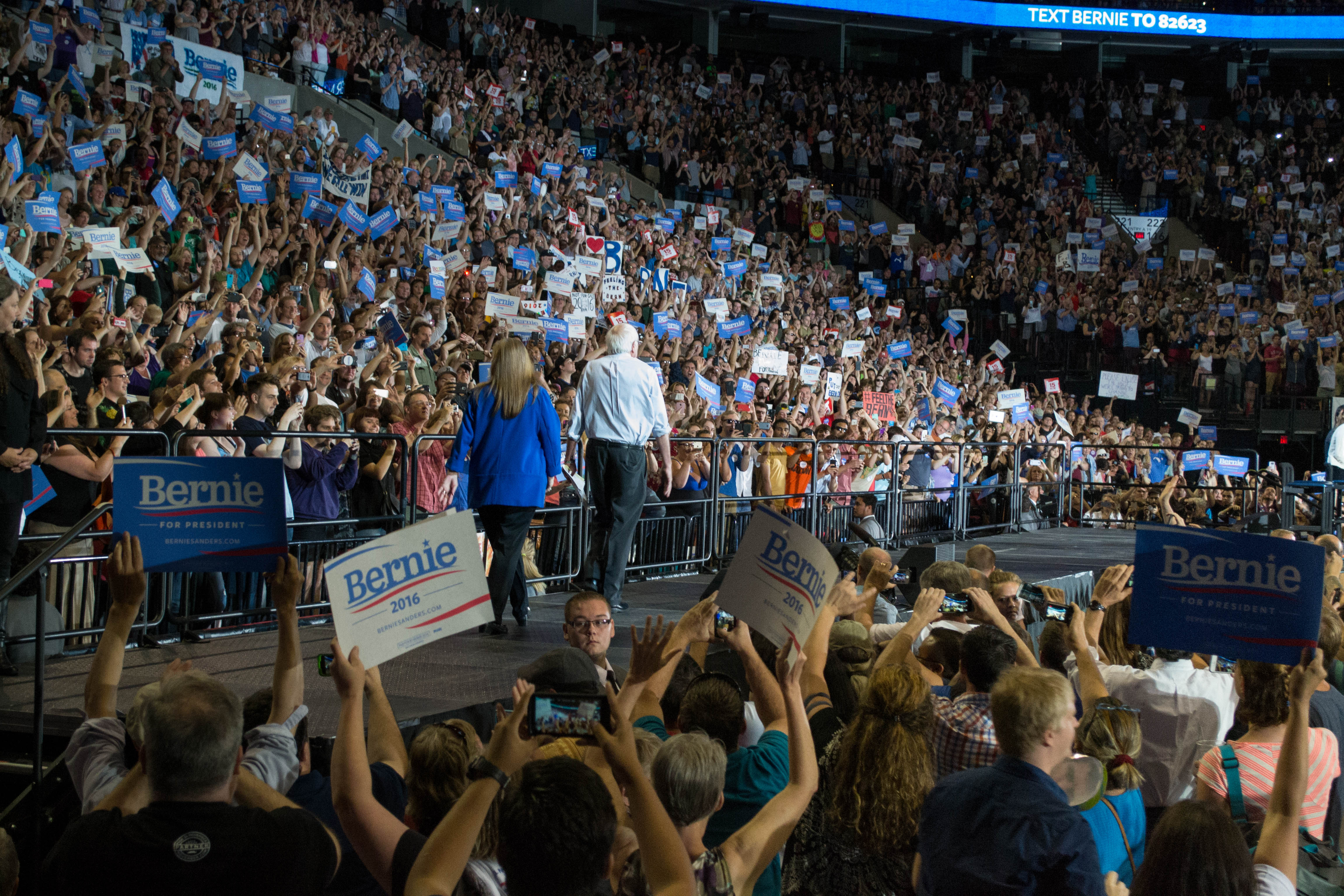
Sanders rally in Portland, Oregon, August 2015

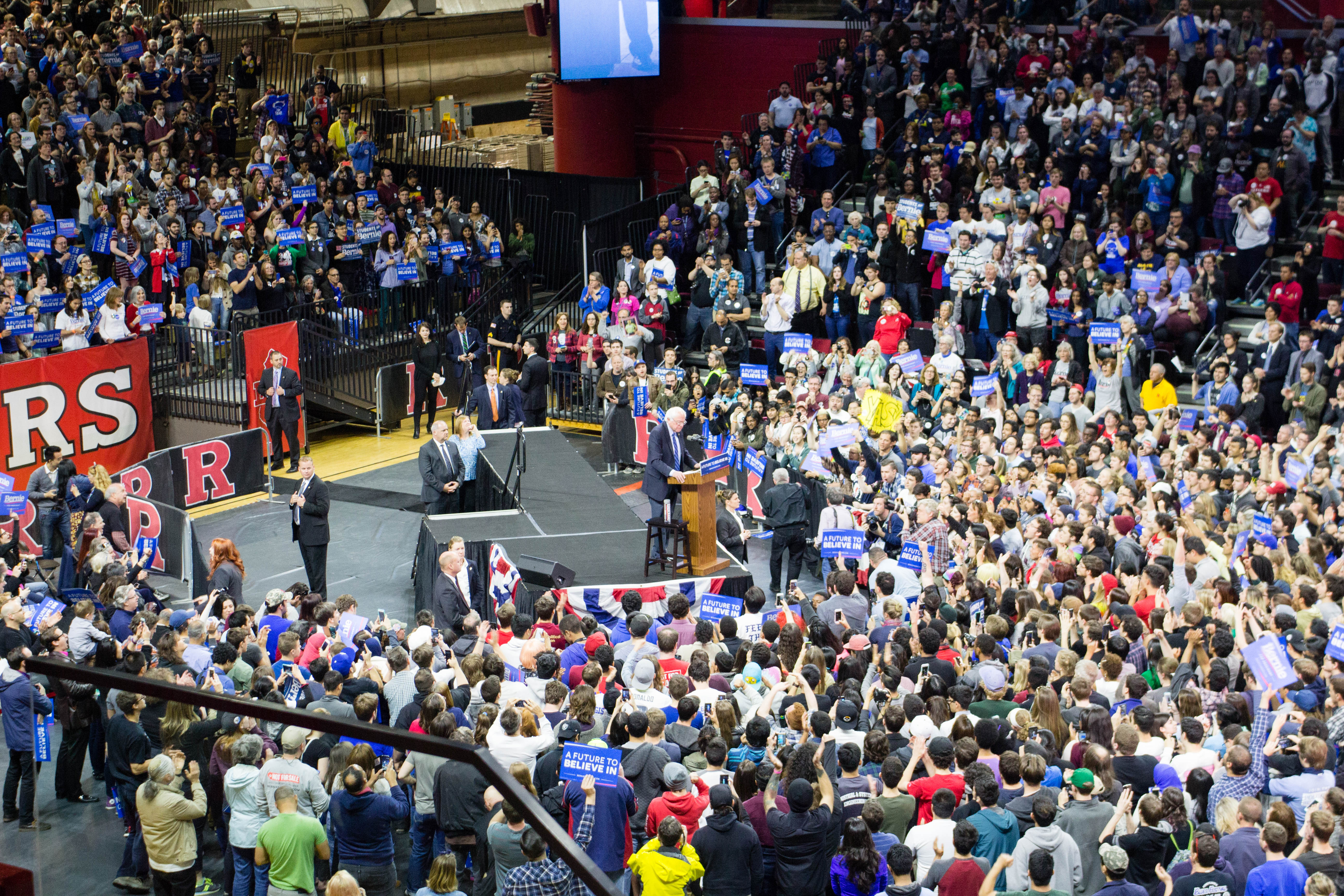
Sanders speaking at Rutgers University in May 2016

During the 2012 Democratic presidential primaries, Sanders—dissatisfied with President Obama's "attempts to trade Social Security cuts for tax hikes"—reportedly considered running against him in the primaries. Sanders had previously suggested in 2011 that it was "a good idea" for someone to challenge Obama and "got so close to running a primary challenge ... that Senator Harry Reid had to intervene to stop him." In November 2013, Sanders suggested that Senator Elizabeth Warren could be president and that she might earn his backing if she ran. He added that if no progressive candidate ran, he might feel compelled to do so himself. In December 2014, Warren said she was not running.

Sanders announced his intention to seek the Democratic Party's nomination for president on April 30, 2015. His campaign was officially launched on May 26 in Burlington. In his announcement, Sanders said, "I don't believe that the men and women who defended American democracy fought to create a situation where billionaires own the political process" and made this a central idea throughout his campaign.

Warren welcomed Sanders's entry into the race, saying, "I'm glad to see him get out there and give his version of what leadership in this country should be", but never endorsed him.

Initially considered a long shot, Sanders won 23 primaries and caucuses and around 46% of pledged delegates to Hillary Clinton's 54%. His campaign was noted for its supporters' enthusiasm, as well as for rejecting large donations from corporations, the financial industry, and any associated Super PAC. Some of the Democratic National Committee (DNC) emails leaked to the public in June and July 2016 showed that the committee leadership had favored Clinton over him and had worked to help Clinton win the nomination.

On July 12, 2016, Sanders formally endorsed Clinton in her unsuccessful general election campaign against Republican Donald Trump, while urging his supporters to continue the "political revolution" his campaign had begun. Following his endorsement, Sanders spent weeks campaigning for Clinton, holding 39 rallies in 13 states during the final three months before the 2016 election.

=== Campaign methods ===
Unlike the other major candidates, Sanders relied on small-dollar donations. His presidential campaign raised $1.5 million within 24 hours of his official announcement. At the end of the year, the campaign had raised a total of $73 million from more than one million people, making 2.5 million donations, with an average donation of $27.16. The campaign reached 3.25 million donations by the end of January 2016, raising $20 million in that month alone.

Sanders used social media to help his campaign gain momentum, posting content to online platforms such as Twitter and Facebook and answering questions on Reddit. He gained a large grassroots organizational following online. A July 29, 2015, meetup organized online brought 100,000 supporters to more than 3,500 simultaneous events nationwide.

To his surprise, Sanders's June 2015 campaign events drew overflow crowds across the country. When Clinton and Sanders made public appearances within days of each other in Des Moines, Iowa, he drew larger crowds, even though he had already made many stops around the state and Clinton's visit was her first in 2015. On July 1, 2015, his campaign stop in Madison, Wisconsin, drew the largest crowd of any 2016 presidential candidate to that date, with an estimated turnout of 10,000. Over the following weeks, he drew even larger crowds: 11,000 in Phoenix; 15,000 in Seattle; and 28,000 in Portland, Oregon.

=== Presidential debates ===
The Democratic National Committee (DNC) announced in May 2015 that there would be six debates. Critics alleged that the small number of debates and the schedule, with half of the debates on Saturday or Sunday nights, were part of the DNC's deliberate attempt to protect Clinton, who was perceived as the front-runner. In February 2016, both the Clinton and Sanders campaigns agreed in principle to holding four more debates for a total of ten. Clinton dropped out of the tenth debate, scheduled to take place just before the California primary, citing a need to devote her time to making direct contact with California voters and preparing for the general election. Sanders expressed disappointment that Clinton canceled the debate before what he believed would be "the largest and most important primary in the presidential nominating process."

=== Polls and news coverage ===
Some Sanders supporters raised concerns that publications such as The New York Times minimized coverage of the Sanders campaign in favor of other candidates, especially Trump and Clinton. The Times' ombudsman reviewed her paper's coverage of the Sanders campaign and found that as of September 2015 the Times "hasn't always taken it very seriously. The tone of some stories is regrettably dismissive, even mocking at times. Some of that is focused on the candidate's age, appearance and style, rather than what he has to say." She also found that the Times's coverage of Sanders's campaign was much scanter than its coverage of Trump's, though Trump's was also initially considered a long shot at that time, with 63 articles covering the Trump campaign and 14 covering Sanders's. A December 2015 report found that the three major networks—CBS, NBC, and ABC—had spent 234 minutes reporting on Trump and 10 minutes on Sanders, despite their similar polling results. The report noted that ABC World News Tonight had spent 81 minutes on Trump and less than one minute on Sanders during 2015.

A study of media coverage in the 2016 election concluded that while Sanders received less coverage than his rival Hillary Clinton, the amount of coverage of Sanders during the election was largely consistent with his polling performance, except during 2015 when Sanders received coverage that far exceeded his standing in the polls. Studies concluded that the tone of media coverage of Sanders was more favorable than that of any other candidate, whereas his main opponent in the Democratic primary, Hillary Clinton, received the most negative coverage of any candidate. All 2016 candidates received vastly less media coverage than Donald Trump, and the Democratic primary received substantially less coverage than the Republican primary.

Amy Goodman of Democracy Now! noted that on March 15, Super Tuesday III, the speeches of Trump, Clinton, Marco Rubio, and Ted Cruz were broadcast in full. Sanders was in Phoenix, Arizona, on that date, speaking to a rally larger than any of the others, yet his speech was not mentioned, let alone broadcast. However, political scientist Rachel Bitecofer wrote in her 2018 book about the 2016 election that the Democratic primary was effectively over in terms of delegate count by mid-March 2016, but that the media promoted the narrative that the contest between Sanders and Clinton was "heating up" at that time.

An NBC/Wall Street Journal poll conducted in May 2016 found Clinton and Trump (by then the presumptive Republican nominee) in a "dead heat", but the same poll found that if Sanders were the Democratic nominee, 53% of voters would support him to 39% for Trump. Clinton and Trump were the least popular likely candidates ever polled, while Sanders received a 43% positive, 36% negative rating. Polls showed that Democratic voters older than 50 preferred Clinton by a large margin but that those under 50 overwhelmingly favored Sanders. A 2017 analysis in Newsweek found that 12% of those who voted for Sanders in the Democratic primary voted for Trump in the general election, a lower proportion than that of Clinton supporters in 2008 who voted for John McCain.

=== DNC email leak ===
In July 2016, a leak of the Democratic National Committee's emails appeared to show DNC officials favoring Clinton over Sanders. Staff repeatedly discussed making his irreligious tendencies a potential campaign issue in southern states and questioned his party loyalty. DNC chair Debbie Wasserman Schultz called his campaign manager "an ass" and "a damn liar". Speaking with Jake Tapper on CNN, Sanders responded to the leak, saying, "it is an outrage and sad that you would have people in important positions in the DNC trying to undermine my campaign. It goes without saying: the function of the DNC is to represent all of the candidates—to be fair and even-minded. But again, we discussed this many, many months ago, on this show, so what is revealed now is not a shock to me."

=== Endorsement of Hillary Clinton ===
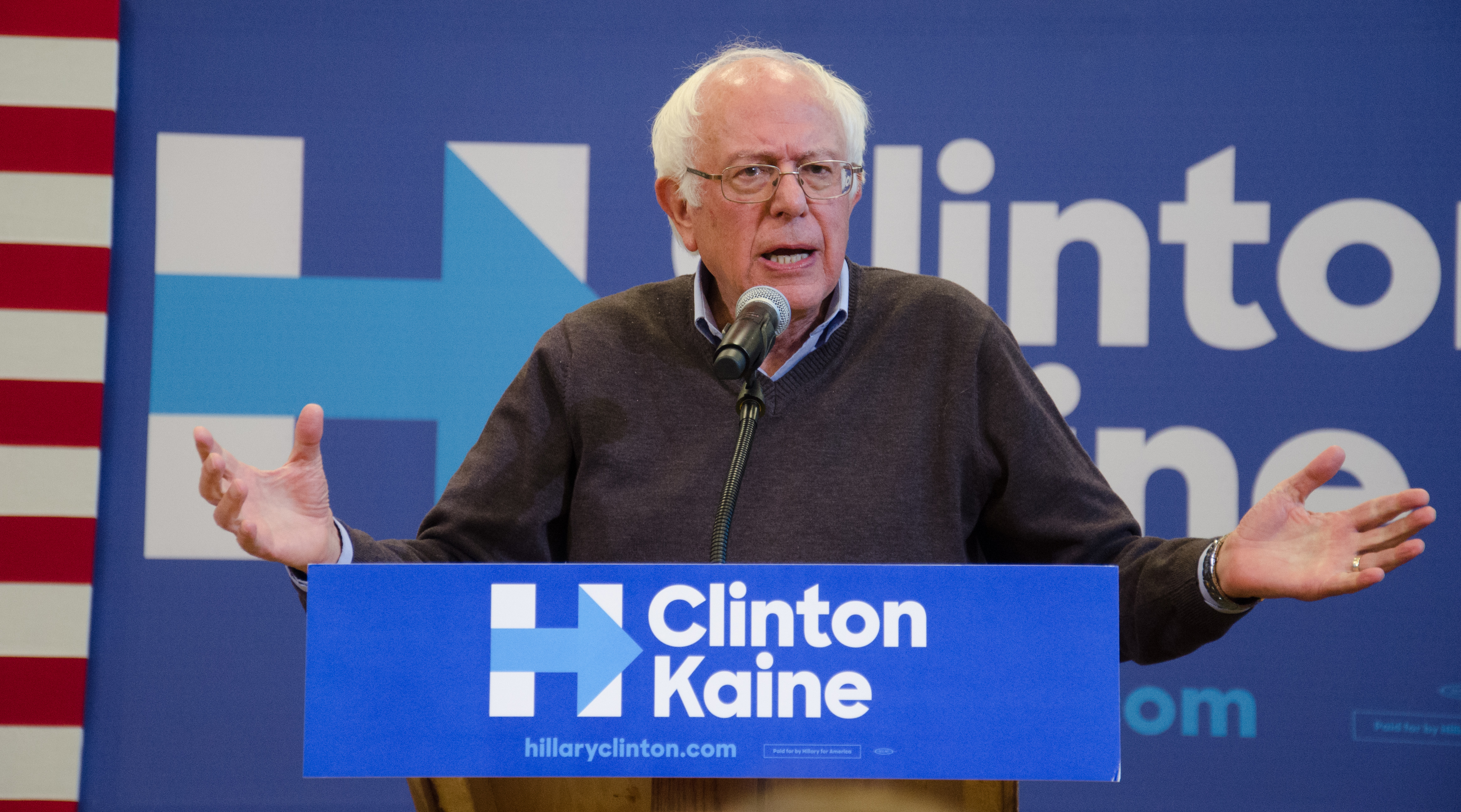
Sanders campaigning for Hillary Clinton at Nashua Community College in October 2016

After the final primary election, Clinton became the presumptive Democratic nominee. On July 12, Sanders formally endorsed Clinton. He said he would continue to work with the Democratic National Convention organizers to implement progressive positions. Sanders refused to formally concede before the convention. He spoke at the 2016 Democratic National Convention on July 25, during which he gave Clinton his full support. Some of his supporters attempted to protest Clinton's nomination and booed when Sanders called for party unity. He responded, "Our job is to do two things: to defeat Donald Trump and to elect Hillary Clinton ... It is easy to boo, but it is harder to look your kids in the face if we are living under a Trump presidency."

On November 8, in the general election, Sanders received almost 6% of the vote in Vermont, even though he was no longer a candidate. This was the highest share of a statewide presidential vote for a write-in draft campaign in American history. He also received more votes in Vermont than Gary Johnson, the Libertarian candidate, and Jill Stein, the Green candidate, combined. It was possible to vote for Sanders as a write-in candidate in 12 states, and exact totals of write-in votes for him were published in three of them: California, New Hampshire, and Vermont. In those three states, he received 111,850 write-in votes, about 15% of the write-in votes nationwide, and less than 1% of total nationwide vote.

=== Post-election activities ===
In November 2016, Sanders's book Our Revolution: A Future to Believe In was released; upon its release, it was number three on The New York Times Best Seller list. The audiobook later received a Grammy nomination for Best Spoken Word Album. In February 2017, he began webcasting The Bernie Sanders Show on Facebook live streaming. As of April 2, 2017, guests had included William Barber, Josh Fox, Jane Mayer, and Bill Nye. Polls taken in 2017 found him to be the most popular politician in the United States.

In February 2018, Special Counsel Robert Mueller's investigation into Russian interference in the 2016 US elections concluded that Russians had communicated false information during the primary campaigns to help Sanders and Stein and harm Clinton. Sanders rejected the investigation's conclusion, saying that he had seen no evidence that Russians had helped his campaign. Furthermore, he questioned the Clinton campaign's lack of action to prevent Russian interference. He later said that his campaign had taken action to prevent Russian meddling in the election and that a campaign staffer had alerted the Clinton campaign. Politico noted that a Sanders campaign volunteer contacted a political action committee (PAC) that supported the Clinton campaign to report suspicious activities but that the Sanders campaign did not contact the Clinton campaign as such.

In November 2018, the Sanders Institute and Yanis Varoufakis, co-founder of DiEM25, launched Progressive International, an international organization uniting progressive activists and organizations "to mobilize people around the world to transform the global order and the institutions that shape it."

=== Influence on the Democratic Party ===
Analysts have suggested that Sanders's campaign shifted both the Clinton campaign and the Democratic Party politically leftward. A new political organization, Brand New Congress, was formed in April 2016 by former campaign staffers. It works to elect congressional representatives with platforms in line with Sanders. In August 2016, he formed Our Revolution, a political organization dedicated to educating voters about issues, getting people involved in the political process, and electing progressive candidates for local, state, and national office. Speaking on the PBS Newshour about the upcoming 2018 elections and discussing the main principles of the two major parties, Susan Page described the Republican Party as "Trump's party" and the Democratic Party as "Bernie Sanders's party", saying that "Sanders and his more progressive stance has really taken hold." Noting the increasing acceptance of his national single-payer health-care program, his $15-an-hour minimum wage stance, free college tuition, and many of the other campaign platform issues he introduced, an April 2018 opinion article in The Week suggested, "Quietly but steadily, the Democratic Party is admitting that Sanders was right." In July 2016, a Slate article called the Democratic platform draft "a monument to his campaign", noting not only his call for a $15 minimum wage but other campaign issues, such as Social Security expansion, a carbon tax, Wall Street reform, opposition to the death penalty, and a "reasoned pathway for future legalization" of marijuana.

Sanders's presidential campaigns led to a resurgence of interest in social democracy and democratic socialism among millennials.

== 2020 presidential campaign ==
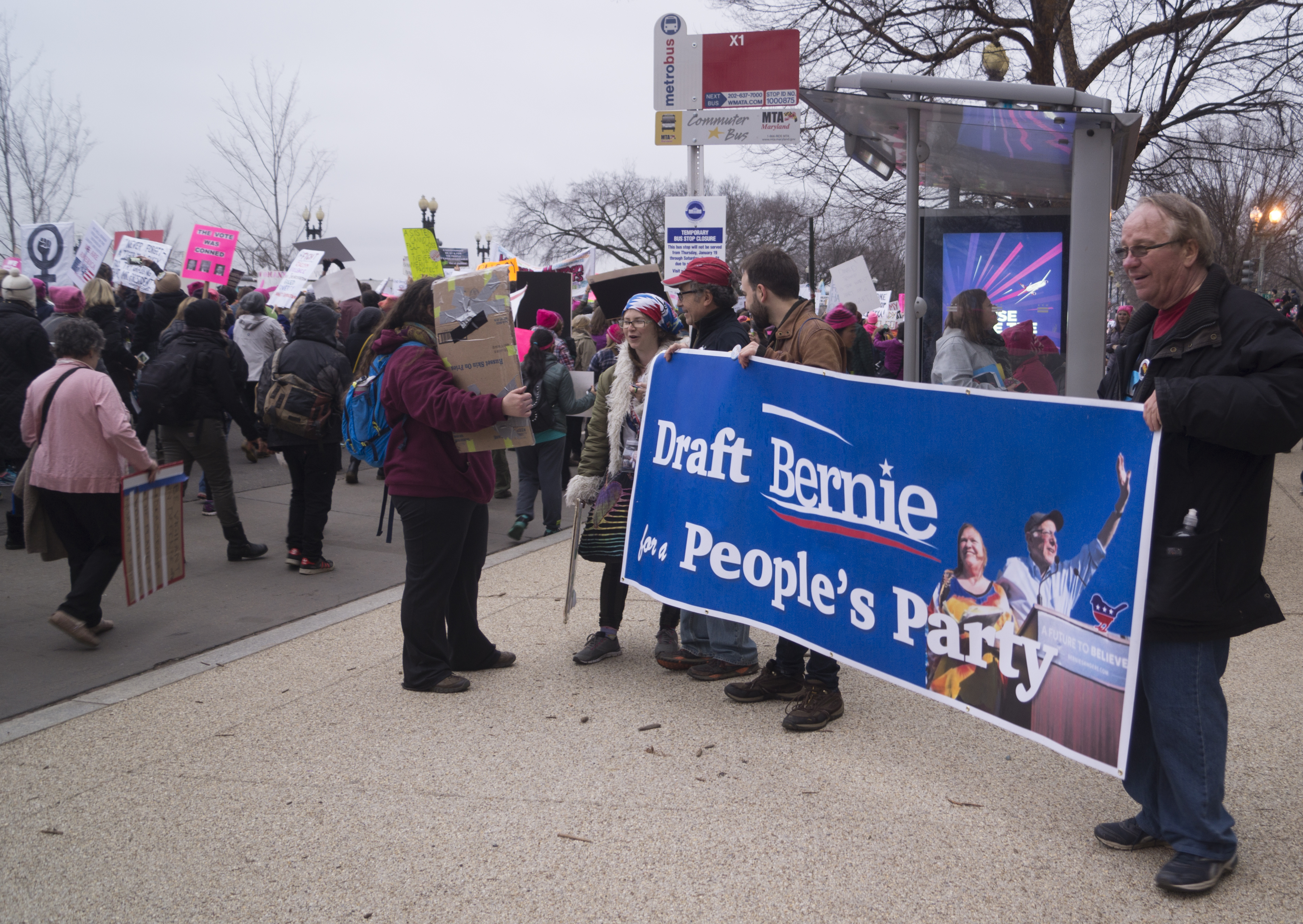
"Draft Bernie" sign at the 2017 Women's March in Washington, D.C.

On February 19, 2019, Sanders announced that he would seek the Democratic Party's 2020 nomination for president. He had declined the Vermont Democratic Party nomination for U.S. Senate in 2006, 2012, and 2018, which caused an unsuccessful legal challenge to his candidacy for the Democratic presidential nomination in 2016. Along with his 2019 campaign announcement, he said he would abide by a new Democratic Party rule for presidential candidates and that he would affirm his membership in that party. On March 5, 2019, he signed a formal statement, known as a "loyalty pledge", that he is a member of the Democratic Party and will serve as a Democrat if elected. News reports noted that the day before, he had signed paperwork to run as an independent for reelection to his Senate seat in 2024.

Bernie Sanders rally, March 24, 2019, in San Francisco, one month after the campaign began

Sanders's campaign manager was Faiz Shakir. The campaign's national co-chairs were Ben & Jerry's co-founder Ben Cohen, Representative Ro Khanna, Our Revolution president Nina Turner, and San Juan mayor Carmen Yulín Cruz.

=== Campaign methods ===
Given the high national profile that Sanders maintained since his 2016 campaign, NPR described him as "no longer an underdog" when he announced his 2020 campaign. Using the large email list it built during the 2016 campaign, the 2020 campaign recruited more than one million volunteers within weeks of its launch. It enlisted several former NowThis News employees to produce professional videos for wide social media distribution, live-streamed various forums to its millions of social media followers, and launched a podcast and smartphone app for grassroots organizing.

=== Fundraising ===
Sanders's 2020 campaign employed many of the same methods as its 2016 counterpart, eschewing a Super PAC and relying predominantly on small-dollar contributions. According to Federal Election Commission filings, the Sanders campaign had raised the most money in the 2020 Democratic field as of June 2019, including money left over from his 2018 Senate and 2016 presidential races. In September 2019, the Sanders campaign became the fastest in US history to reach one million donors. On October 1, 2019, the campaign announced it had raised $25.3 million in the year's third quarter, with an average donation of $18. It was the largest quarterly sum raised by any Democratic candidate. The campaign raised $34.5 million in the fourth quarter of 2019.

=== Polls and news coverage ===
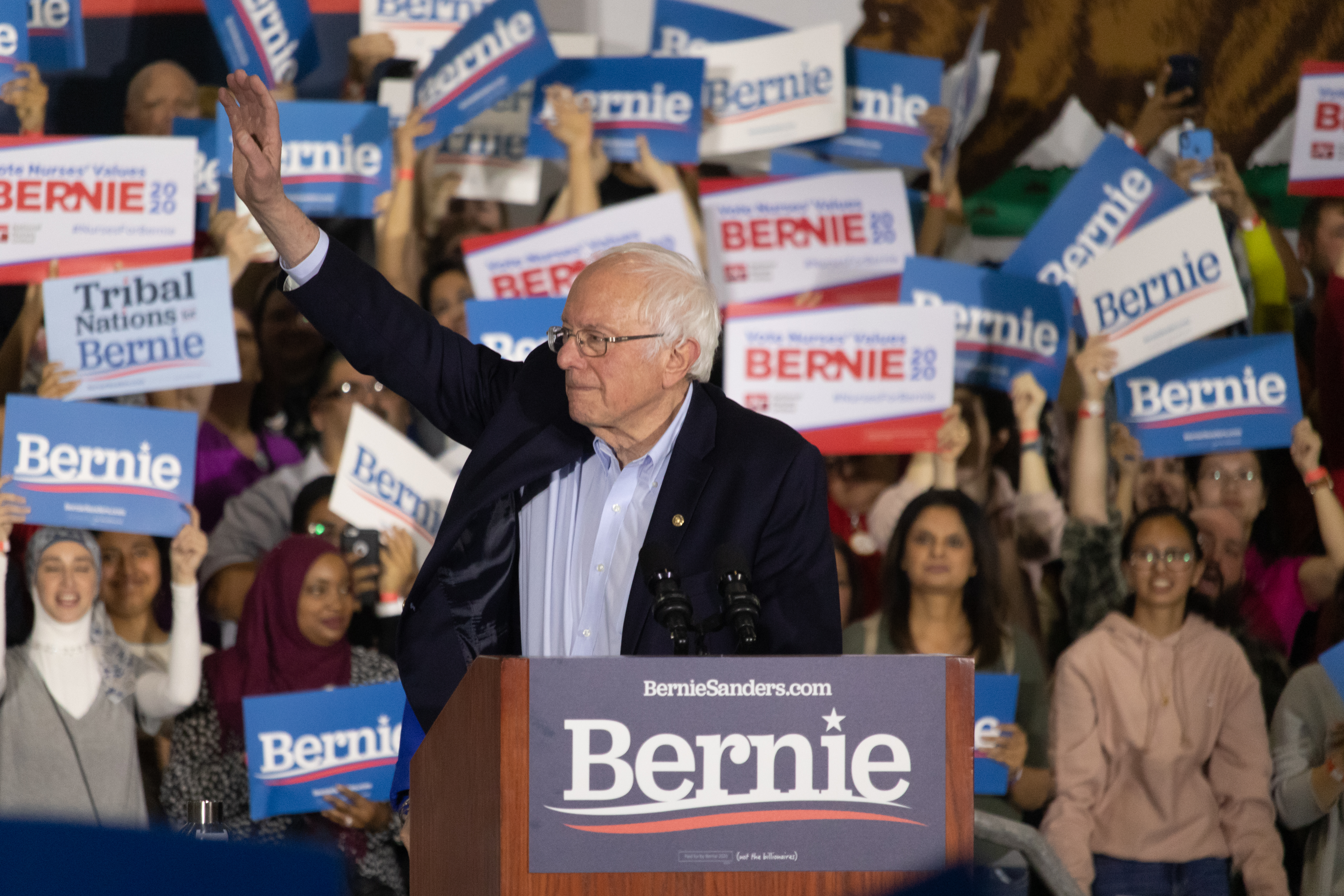
Sanders campaigning for president in San Jose, California, March 2020

Sanders steadily polled between 15% and 20% on most national surveys between May and September 2019, according to the RealClearPolitics average. This placed him in a decisive second-place behind Joe Biden until Elizabeth Warren and Kamala Harris caught up in July. From mid-February 2020 to the start of March, Sanders polled in first place in the Democratic primary ahead of Joe Biden and was described by the press as the party's presidential front-runner.

According to a RealClearPolitics analysis, Sanders received the third-most mentions on CNN, Fox News, and MSNBC between January and August 2019, trailing only Joe Biden and Kamala Harris. Biden, however, received twice as many mentions as Sanders and Harris. Mentions of Sanders on ABC World News Tonight found him in second place, though also trailing Biden by a large margin. Online mentions "reflect a slightly more balanced picture", with both Sanders and Elizabeth Warren running "neck-and-neck" with Biden.

=== Forums and other appearances ===
On April 6, 2019, Sanders participated in a Fox News town hall that attracted more than 2.55 million viewers. His decision to appear on Fox was controversial, given the Democratic National Committee's decision not to allow Fox to host any of its debates. His appearance saw an increase of Fox News viewers by 24% overall and 40% in the 25-to-54-year-old demographic, surpassing the ratings of all other Democratic presidential candidate town halls that year. As of September 2019, the town hall had more than 1.5 million views on YouTube.

On August 6, 2019, Sanders appeared on The Joe Rogan Experience podcast. Some praised Rogan for "hosting a pragmatic discussion" while others "seemed rather stunned by Sanders's decision to appear on the show at all". After the podcast, Rogan became a top-trending Twitter topic. After interviewing him, Rogan said, "I am not right-wing ... I've interviewed right-wing people. I am 100% left-wing ... Bernie Sanders made a ton of sense to me and I would 100% vote for him." As of October 2019, the podcast had received more than ten million views on YouTube.

=== Presidential debates ===
In December 2018, the Democratic National Committee (DNC) announced the preliminary schedule for 12 official DNC-sanctioned debates, set to begin in June 2019, with six in 2019 and the remaining six during the first four months of 2020. During the July and September debates, commentators described Sanders and Elizabeth Warren as having a "non-aggression pact", staking out similar progressive positions in contrast to the more conservative candidates. In the October 15 debate, his first appearance since his heart attack, debate coach Todd Graham gave Sanders's performance an A, his highest rating of all the candidates.

CNN hosted the first 2020 debate in January with six candidates remaining. Co-moderator Abby Phillip questioned Sanders and Warren about an allegation Warren had made that he had privately told her that a woman could not defeat Donald Trump. Phillip asked Sanders, "Senator Sanders, CNN reported yesterday, and Senator Warren confirmed in a statement, that in 2018 you told her that you did not believe that a woman could win the election. Why did you say that?" Ignoring Sanders's strong denial, Phillip asked Warren, "What did you think when Bernie Sanders told you that a woman couldn't become president?" In an interview after the debate, Sanders called it ludicrous to believe that he would doubt a woman's ability to win the presidency and noted that a woman already had won the national popular vote, saying, "After all, Hillary Clinton beat Donald Trump by 3 million votes in 2016."

=== Suspension of campaign ===
Sanders announced that he was suspending his campaign on April 8, 2020. He stated that he would remain on the ballot in the remaining states and continue to accumulate delegates with the goal of influencing the Democratic Party's platform. On April 14, Sanders endorsed Biden. Biden responded, "I think that your endorsement means a great deal. It means a great deal to me. I think people are going to be surprised that we are apart on some issues but we're awfully close on a whole bunch of others. I'm going to need you—not just to win the campaign, but to govern."

== Political positions ==
A self-described democratic socialist, Sanders is a progressive and left-wing populist who admires social democratic programs in Europe and supports workplace democracy via union democracy, worker cooperatives, and workers' management of public enterprises. He is a strong critic of contemporary neoliberal capitalism, which he calls "uber-capitalism", blaming it for such social ills as declining life expectancy and rising diseases of despair. He advocates universal, single-payer healthcare, paid parental leave, and tuition-free tertiary education. He supports lowering the cost of drugs by reforming patent laws to allow cheaper generic versions to be sold in the US. He supported the Affordable Care Act, though he said it did not go far enough. In November 2015, he gave a speech at Georgetown University about his view of democratic socialism, including its place in the policies of presidents Franklin D. Roosevelt and Lyndon B. Johnson. Defining what "democratic socialism" means to him, Sanders said: "I don't believe government should take over the grocery store down the street or own the means of production, but I do believe that the middle class and the working families who produce the wealth of America deserve a decent standard of living and that their incomes should go up, not down. I do believe in private companies that thrive and invest and grow in America, companies that create jobs here, rather than companies that are shutting down in America and increasing their profits by exploiting low-wage labor abroad.."

Based on his positions and votes throughout his career, many commentators consider his political platform primarily focused on tax-funded social benefits inspired by the Nordic model and not on social ownership of the means of production. Some socialists and major socialist organizations have described Sanders as a democratic socialist, market socialist, or reformist socialist, while others have called him a reformist social democrat.

Jacobin magazine editor Bhaskar Sunkara has characterized Sanders's politics as "class struggle social democracy", arguing that while postwar social democracy operated as a compromise that instituted tripartite arrangements between business, labor, and government to dampen class conflict, Sanders sees social democratic demands as a means to sharpening class confrontation and raising class consciousness. His views have been echoed by George Eaton, arguing that Sunkara's phrase "captures the nuances of Sanders' politics in a way that a socialist / social democrat binary does not" and asserting that if he was elected president it would represent "the triumph of a politics that is neither wholly socialist, nor social democratic, but a new fusion of both".

=== Climate change ===
Sanders views global warming as a serious problem, and advocates bold action to reverse its effects. He calls for substantial investment in infrastructure, with energy efficiency, sustainability, and job creation as prominent goals. He considers climate change the greatest threat to national security. He said that family planning can help fight climate change. He opposed the construction of the Dakota Access Pipeline on the grounds that, like the Keystone XL Pipeline, it "will have a significant impact on our climate." In 2019, he announced his support for Green New Deal legislation and joined representatives Alexandria Ocasio-Cortez and Earl Blumenauer in proposing legislation that would declare climate change a national and international emergency.

=== Economic issues ===
Sanders focuses on economic issues such as income and wealth inequality, poverty, raising the minimum wage, universal healthcare, canceling all student debt, making public colleges and universities tuition-free by taxing financial transactions, establishing a 32-hour work week, and expanding Social Security benefits by eliminating the cap on the payroll tax on incomes above $250,000. He has become a prominent supporter of laws requiring companies to give their workers parental leave, sick leave, and vacation time, noting that nearly all other developed countries have such laws. He also supports legislation that would make it easier for workers to join or form a trade union. He opposed the Troubled Asset Relief Program and has called for comprehensive financial reforms, such as breaking up "too big to fail" financial institutions, restoring Glass–Steagall legislation, reforming the Federal Reserve Bank, and allowing the Post Office to offer basic financial services in economically marginalized communities.

Believing greater emphasis is needed on labor rights and environmental concerns when negotiating international trade agreements, Sanders voted against and has long spoken against NAFTA, CAFTA, and PNTR with China. He has called them a "disaster for the American worker", saying that they have resulted in American corporations moving abroad. He also opposes the Trans-Pacific Partnership, which he says was "written by corporate America and the pharmaceutical industry and Wall Street." On May 1, 2019, he tweeted: "Since the China trade deal I voted against, America has lost over three million manufacturing jobs. It's wrong to pretend that China isn't one of our major economic competitors."

Sanders also strongly opposes outsourcing American jobs. During discussions of the United States Innovation and Competition Act, which was to be used to fund the manufacture of semiconductors amid a shortage, he proposed a measure to ensure the companies the bill funded could not outsource their jobs. The proposed measure would also block the companies from forbidding their employees to unionize. Sanders's proposal was voted down by most Democrats and all Republicans in the Senate. Ahead of the 2022 midterms, Sanders said he wants the Democratic Party to focus more on supporting unionization: "I think we should move to a system where, if 50% of the workers in a bargaining unit plus one vote to form a union, they have a union. End of discussion."

Sanders supports establishing worker-owned cooperatives and introduced legislation numerous times from the 1990s to the 2020s that would aid workers who want to "form their own businesses or to set up worker-owned cooperatives." As early as 1976, Sanders proposed workplace democracy, saying, "I believe that, in the long run, major industries in this state and nation should be publicly owned and controlled by the workers themselves." Likewise, he supports empowering and expanding labor unions to advance union democracy. In 1987, Sanders defined democracy as public ownership and workers' self-management in the workplace, saying: "Democracy means public ownership of the major means of production, it means decentralization, it means involving people in their work. Rather than having bosses and workers it means having democratic control over the factories and shops to as great a degree as you can." In his 2020 run for president, he proposed that 20% of stocks in corporations with over $100 million in annual revenue be owned by the corporation's workers and that 45% of the board of directors of corporations with over $100 million in annual revenue be elected by the workers of that corporation.

=== Foreign policy ===
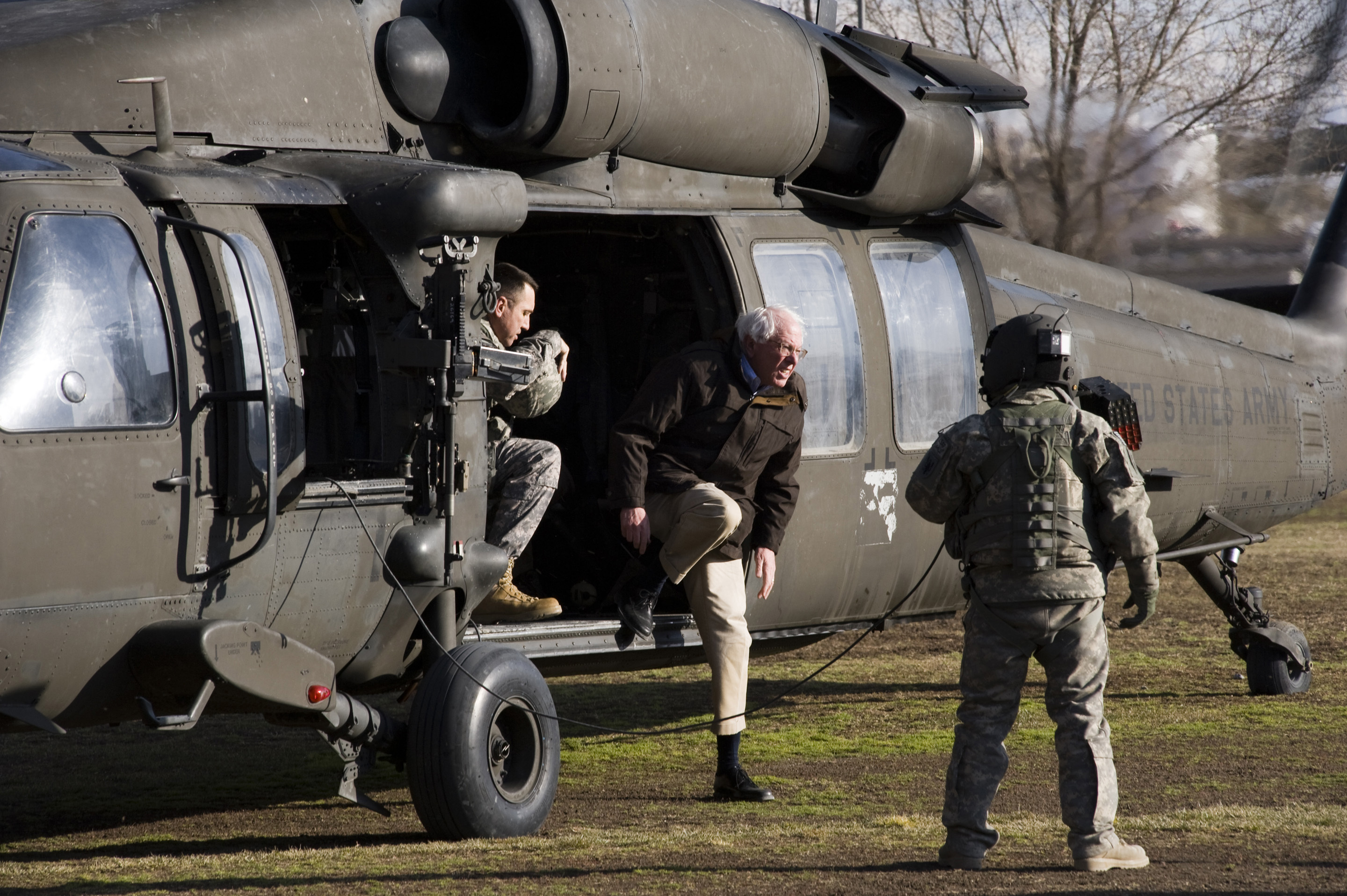
Sanders steps out of a Sikorsky UH-60 Black Hawk helicopter after arriving in Afghanistan in 2011.

Sanders supports reducing military spending while pursuing more diplomacy and international cooperation. He opposed funding the Nicaraguan rebels known as the contras in the CIA's covert war against Nicaragua's leftist government. He opposed the US invasion of Iraq and has criticized a number of policies instituted during the war on terror, particularly that of mass surveillance and the USA Patriot Act. He criticized Israel's actions during the 2014 Gaza war and US involvement in the Saudi Arabian-led intervention in Yemen. On November 15, 2015, in response to the Islamic State of Iraq and the Levant (ISIL)'s attacks in Paris, he cautioned against Islamophobia and said, "We gotta be tough, not stupid" in the war against ISIL, adding that the US should continue to welcome Syrian refugees. He criticized the January 2020 drone assassination of Iranian general Qasem Soleimani, calling it a dangerous escalation of tensions that could lead to an expensive war.

Sanders supports Palestinian rights and has often criticized Israel, while consistently supporting Israel's right to exist. In 2020, he called the American Israel Public Affairs Committee a platform for bigotry and said he would not attend its conference. He condemned Trump's decision to recognize Jerusalem as Israel's capital, saying, "It would dramatically undermine the prospects for an Israeli–Palestinian peace agreement, and severely, perhaps irreparably, damage the United States' ability to broker that peace." During the Gaza war, he criticized Hamas for the October 7 attacks and Israel for its bombing of Gaza. He first called for only a pause in fighting, saying that he "doesn't know if a ceasefire is possible with an organization like Hamas", but later called for a humanitarian ceasefire and urged Biden to withhold military aid to Israel. Sanders accused Israel of mass starvation, ethnic cleansing, and extermination. Sanders initially said that allegations of genocide had to be adjudicated by the International Court of Justice, but in September 2025 he said: "The intent is clear. The conclusion is inescapable: Israel is committing genocide in Gaza."

Addressing Westminster College in a September 2017 speech, Sanders laid out a foreign policy plan for greater international collaboration, adherence to US-led international agreements such as the Paris Agreement and the Iran nuclear deal framework and promoting human rights and democratic ideals. He emphasized the consequences associated with global economic inequality and climate change and urged reining in the use of US military power, saying it "must always be a last resort". He also criticized US support for "murderous regimes" during the Cold War, such as those in Iran, Chile and El Salvador and said that those actions continue to make the US less safe. He also spoke critically of Russian interference in the 2016 US elections and the way President Trump has handled the crisis. He does not consider Turkey a US ally and condemned the Turkish military offensive against US-aligned Kurdish forces in northeastern Syria.

=== Gun laws ===
Sanders supports closing the "gun show loophole", banning assault weapons, and passing and enforcing universal federal background checks for gun purchases. In 1990, his bid to become a US Representative benefitted from the National Rifle Association of America opposing the competing campaign of Peter Smith, who had reversed his stance on firearm restrictions, and waiting periods for handgun purchases. In 1993, while a US representative, he voted against the Brady Handgun Violence Prevention Act (which established background checks and wait periods), and in 2005 voted for legislation that gave gun manufacturers legal immunity against claims of negligence, but as of 2016 he has since said that he would support repealing that law. In 1996, he voted against additional funding to the Centers for Disease Control and Prevention for research on issues related to firearms, but in 2016, he called for an increase in CDC funding for the study of gun violence.

=== Social issues ===
On social issues, Sanders has long taken progressive stances. He considers himself a feminist, is pro-choice on abortion, and opposes defunding Planned Parenthood. He has long advocated for LGBT rights; in 2009, he supported legalizing same-sex marriage in Vermont. Sanders has denounced institutional racism and called for criminal justice reform to reduce the number of people in prison, advocates a crackdown on police brutality, and supports abolishing private, for-profit prisons and the death penalty. He supports Black Lives Matter. He also supports legalizing marijuana at the federal level. He has advocated for greater democratic participation by citizens, campaign finance reform, and a constitutional amendment or judicial decision that would overturn Citizens United v. FEC.

=== First Trump administration ===
Sanders criticized President Trump for appointing multiple billionaires to his cabinet. He criticized Trump's rolling back President Obama's Clean Power Plan, noting the scientifically reported effect on climate change of human activity and citing Trump's calling those reports a hoax. He called for caution on the Syrian Civil War, saying, "It's easier to get into a war than out of one." In 2017, he promised to defeat "Trump and Trumpism and the Republican right-wing ideology".

Sanders gave an online reply to Trump's January 2018 State of the Union address in which he called Trump "compulsively dishonest" and criticized him for initiating "a looming immigration crisis" by ending the Deferred Action for Childhood Arrivals program. He voiced concern about Trump's failure to mention the finding that Russia had interfered in the 2016 election and "will likely interfere in the 2018 midterms we will be holding ... Unless you have a very special relationship with Mr. Putin".

On January 6, 2021, Trump supporters attacked the United States Capitol. Sanders commented: "[Trump] has made it clear that he will do anything to remain in power – including insurrection and inciting violence [and he] will go down in history as the worst and most dangerous president in history."

Sanders voted to convict Trump on both articles of his first impeachment trial in 2020 (for pressuring a foreign leader to investigate Joe Biden), and again on the sole article of his second impeachment trial in 2021 (for inciting the Capitol attack).

=== Biden administration ===
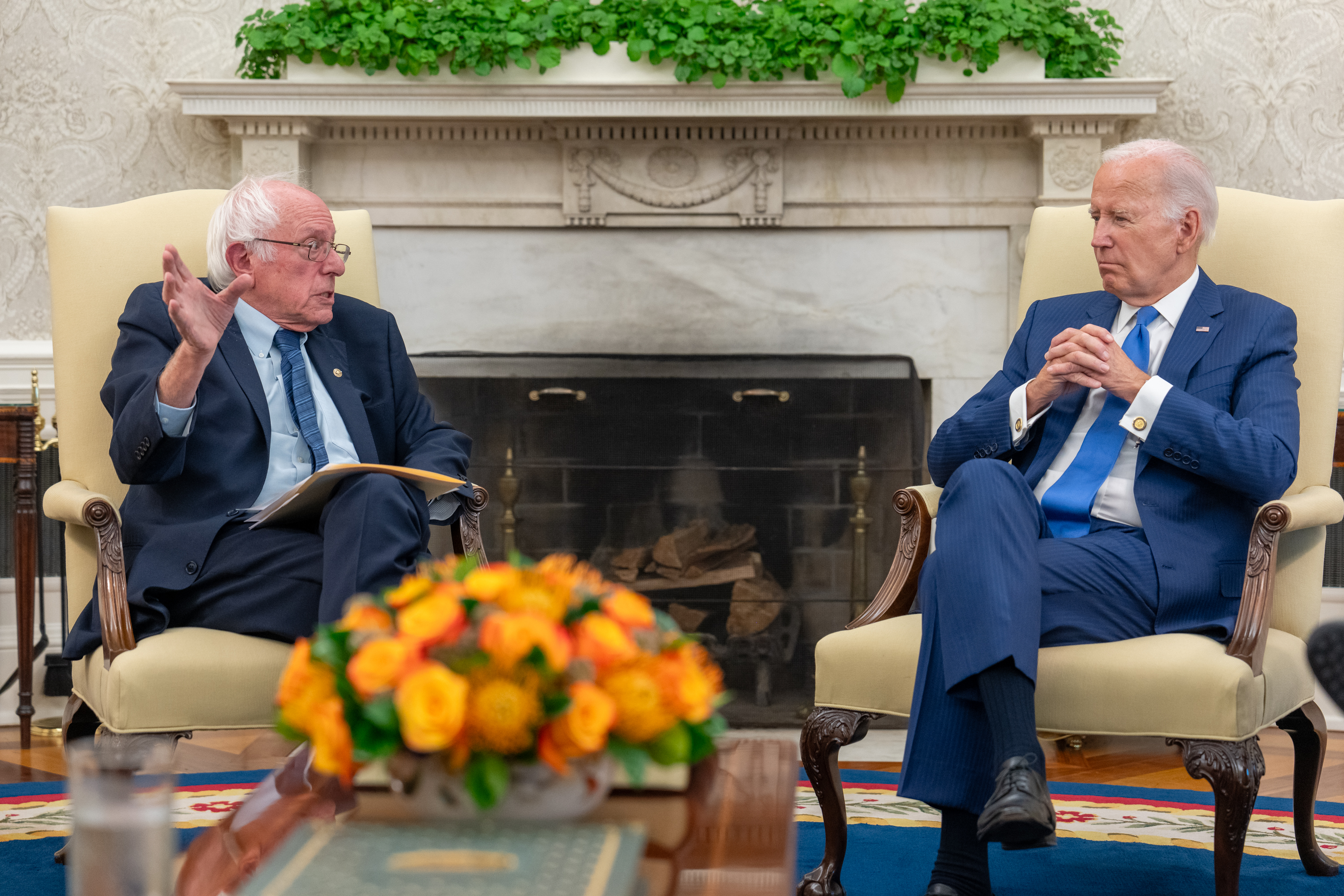
Sanders speaking with president Biden in 2023

Sanders influenced the environmental policy goals of the Biden administration as described before Biden's nomination. Biden's policy team adopted certain details from the Biden–Sanders Unity Task Forces' climate recommendations.

After Biden was elected president, Sanders became the subject of speculation over a potential appointment as Labor Secretary, which was supported by several progressive groups, such as the Sunrise Movement. For his part, Sanders said that he would accept Biden's nomination if it was offered, but Boston mayor Marty Walsh was chosen for the position instead. When announcing Walsh's nomination, Biden confirmed that he had discussed the position with Sanders, but the two agreed that Sanders's resignation from the Senate and the ensuing special election would have put the Democrats' slim Senate majority at risk.

On February 23, 2021, Sanders became the first senator in the Democratic caucus to oppose one of Biden's cabinet picks when he voted against Tom Vilsack's confirmation as Agriculture Secretary, citing concerns about Vilsack's past work as a lobbyist and ties to large corporations. In 2022, Sanders signed letters to Vilsack and Solicitor General of the United States Elizabeth Prelogar asking them to support the California farm animal welfare law Proposition 12 against a challenge to the law the National Pork Producers Council filed before the Supreme Court.

Sanders strongly supported Senate Democrats' decision to use budget reconciliation, a procedure used to avoid filibusters, to pass the American Rescue Plan Act of 2021, despite having criticized Republicans' use of reconciliation to pass the 2017 tax cuts. The bill passed the Senate by a 50–49 vote and was signed into law by Biden on March 11, 2021.

Sanders has continued to have a strong influence on the Biden administration. When it was noted that he had become a key voice in Biden's administration, he replied, "As somebody who wrote a book called Outsider in the House, yes, it is a strange experience to be having that kind of influence that we have now." Their relationship has lasted over 30 years and Sanders has said it is based on respect and trust: "We have had a good relationship. He wants to be a champion of working families, and I admire that and respect that."

A few days before the 2022 United States elections, Sanders said he regarded them as deciding the fate of democracy, abortion, and climate change, calling them the "most consequential" midterm elections of modern US history. He expressed fear that the Democratic Party had "not done a good enough job" of getting its message out "to young people and working-class people".

Sanders was the only independent or Democratic senator to oppose the CHIPS and Science Act, joining 17 Republican senators. He called the bill "crony capitalism" and set several conditions for acceptance of the bill: "Companies must agree to issue warrants or equity stakes to the federal government; they must commit to not buying back their own stock, outsourcing American jobs overseas or repealing existing collective bargaining agreements; and they must remain neutral in any union organizing efforts".

In April 2023, Sanders endorsed Biden in the 2024 United States presidential election, and after Biden withdrew from the race, Sanders endorsed Harris for president at the Democratic National Convention. Sanders attempted to appeal to pro-Palestinian critics of Harris by saying, "I promise you, after Kamala wins, we will together do everything that we can to change US policy toward Netanyahu", and emphasizing Donald Trump's policies on climate change, minimum wage, and tax cuts for the wealthy.

=== Second Trump administration ===
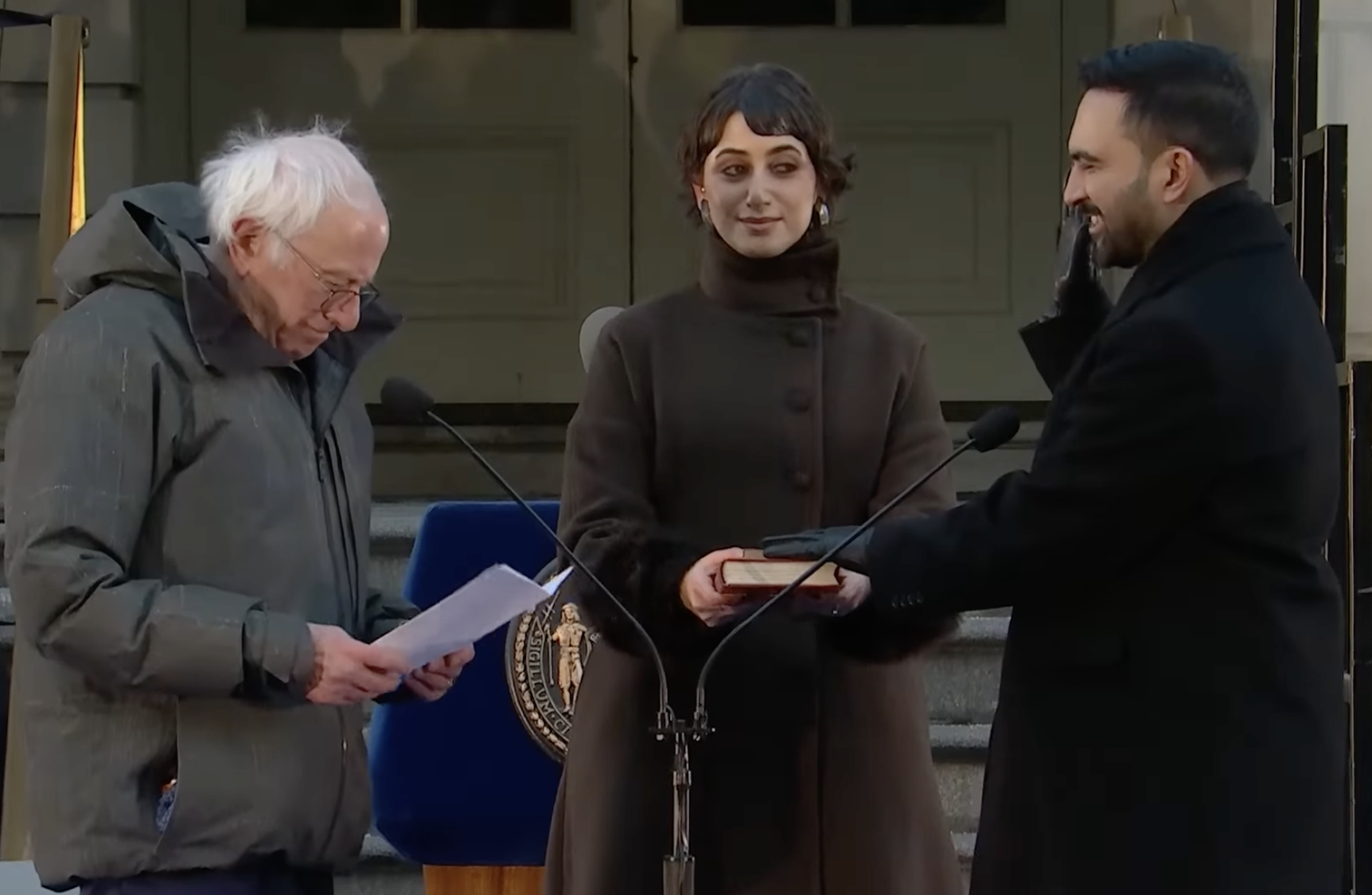
Sanders swearing in Zohran Mamdani as Mayor of New York City in 2026

Trump's reelection in 2024 was met with consternation by Democrats. The three richest men in America attended Trump's second inauguration, and Elon Musk's formation of DOGE, as well as the enactment of Project 2025, were seen as myopic and unconstitutional, featuring policies such as reducing taxes on corporations and capital gains, instituting a flat income tax on individuals, cutting Medicare and Medicaid, reversing President Joe Biden's policies, and reducing environmental protections. After Trump won the election, Sanders released a statement blaming the Democratic Party's abandonment of "working-class people" for its defeat. In February 2025, Sanders began the "Fighting Oligarchy Tour", in which he and Ocasio-Cortez held rallies criticizing Trump's policies and economic inequality. In April 2025, Sanders criticized the administration, saying that its moving "rapidly toward oligarchy", he also called US a "pseudo-democracy".

At one rally held in June 2025, Sanders reacted to news of Trump's bombing of Iranian nuclear sites by saying: "The American people are being lied to again today. We cannot allow history to repeat itself". Also in June, Sanders endorsed progressive politician and DSA member Zohran Mamdani for the 2025 New York City Democratic mayoral primary, calling him "best choice" for mayor. In September 2025, Sanders criticized Democratic Party officials for their perceived refusal to support Mamdani after his victory in the New York City mayoral primary. In the same month, Sanders gave an interview to Mamdani in which they discussed Sanders's political beginnings and his achievements as a mayor and senator. On September 15, 2025, Sanders said that Israel is committing genocide in Gaza, becoming the first US senator to make such comment. In early February 2026, he criticized the U.S. government's proposed military aid to Israel. In a post on social media, he wrote that the U.S. was planning to send approximately $7 billion in weapons to Israel. Sanders argued that the U.S. should prioritize domestic needs, such as healthcare for all Americans, rather than provide military assistance to Israel. In April 2026, he proposed a resolution to block certain military aid to Israel, which failed.

After Trump's speech at the United Nations on September 22, 2026, Sanders said that Trump's threat to "annihilate" Iran was a "war crime" and wrote: "Let's be clear: Trump's war in Iran is illegal and unconstitutional. Congress must end it NOW."

== Party affiliations ==
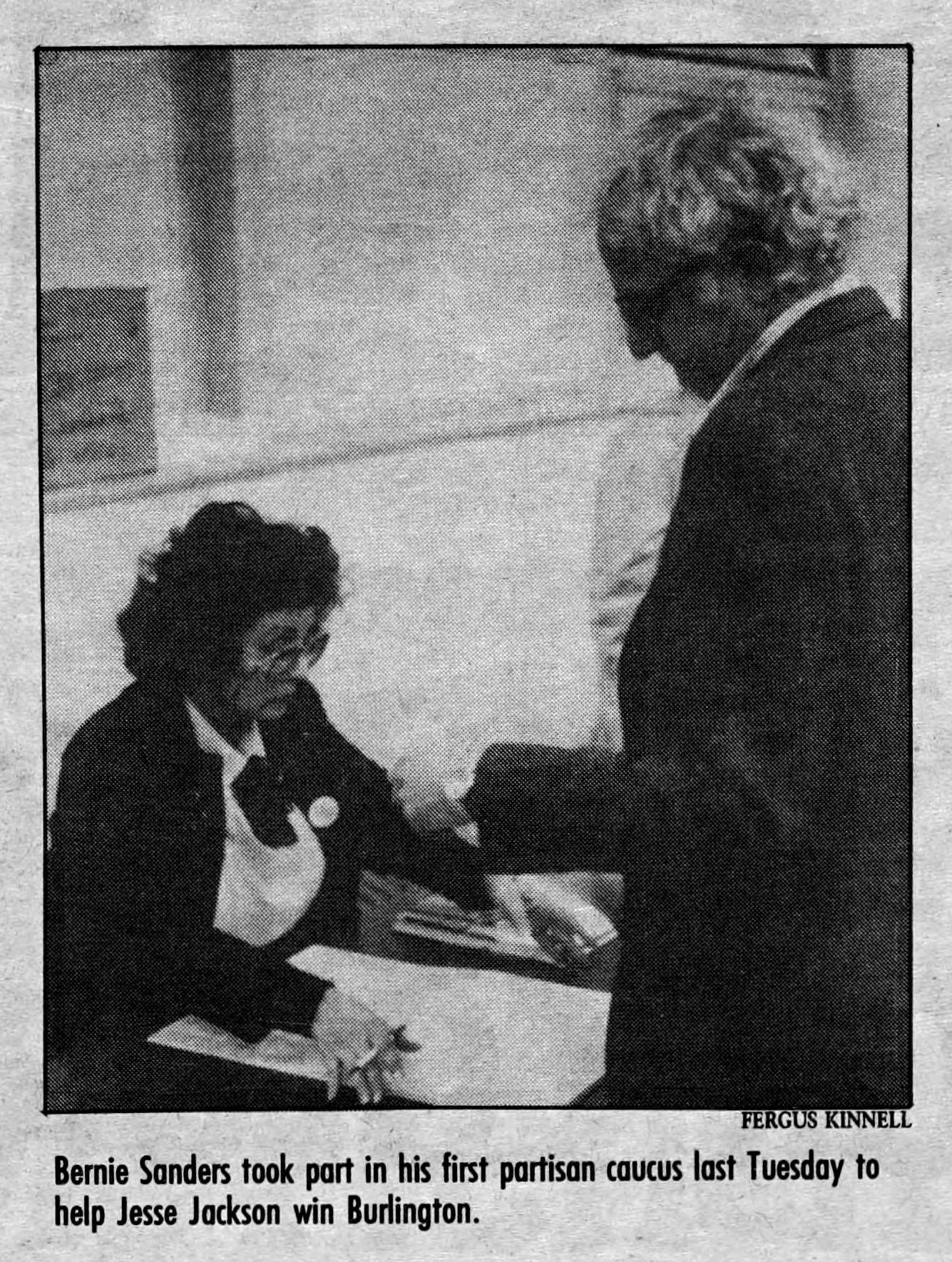
Clipping from The Vermont Cynic, April 21, 1988

Born into a Democratic-voting family, Sanders was first introduced to political activism when his brother Larry joined the Young Democrats of America and campaigned for Adlai Stevenson II in 1956. Sanders joined Vermont's Liberty Union Party in 1971 and was a candidate for several offices, never coming close to winning election. He became party chairman, but quit in 1977 to become an independent. In 1980, he served as an elector for the Socialist Workers Party. In 1981, Sanders ran as an independent for mayor of Burlington, Vermont, and defeated the Democratic incumbent; he was reelected three times. Although an independent, he endorsed Democratic presidential candidates Walter Mondale in 1984 and Jesse Jackson in 1988. His endorsement of Mondale was lukewarm (telling reporters that "if you go around saying that Mondale would be a great president, you would be a liar and a hypocrite"), but he supported Jackson enthusiastically. The Washington Post reported that the Jackson campaign helped inspire Sanders to work more closely with the Democratic Party.

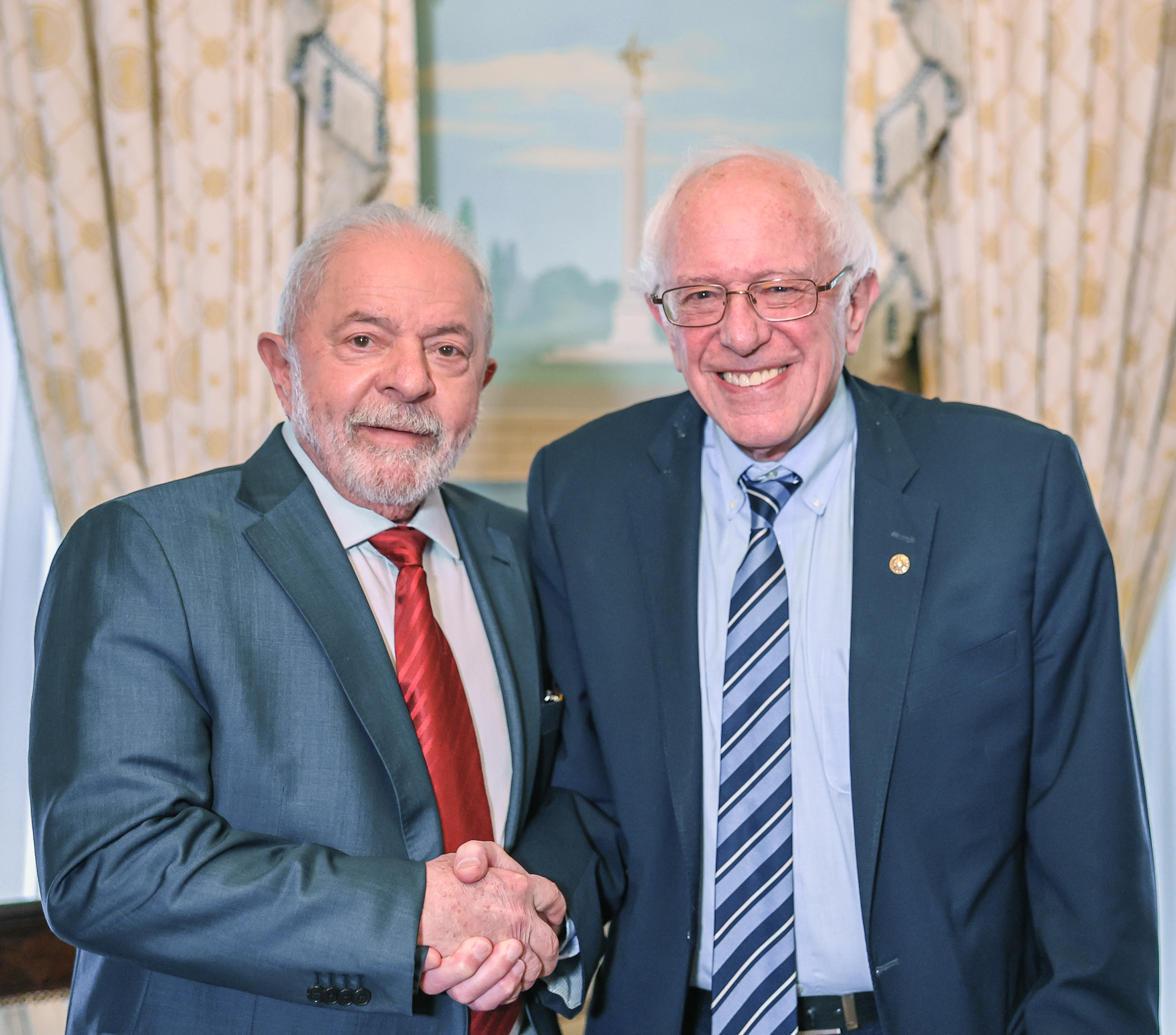
Sanders with President of Brazil Luiz Inácio Lula da Silva in 2023

Sanders attended the 1983 conference of the Socialist Party USA where he gave a speech.

Sanders first ran for the US House of Representatives in 1988 and for the US Senate in 2006, often adopting a strategy of winning the Democratic Party primary, thereby eliminating Democratic challengers, and then running as an independent in the general election. He continued this strategy through his reelection in the 2018 United States Senate election in Vermont. Throughout his tenure in Congress, he has been listed as an independent. He caucused with Democrats in the House while refusing to join the party, and continues to caucus with Democrats in the Senate. Some conservative southern House Democrats initially barred him from the caucus as they believed that allowing a self-described socialist to join would harm their electoral prospects. He soon came to work constructively with Democrats, voting with the party over 90% of the time during his tenure in Congress.

Starting with his 2016 presidential campaign, Sanders's announcements suggested that not only was he running as a Democrat, but that he would run as a Democrat in future elections. When challenged by Clinton about his party commitment, he said, "Of course I am a Democrat and running for the Democratic nomination." Since he remained a senator elected as an independent, his US Senate website and press materials continued to refer to him as an independent during the campaign and upon his return to the Senate. In October 2017, Sanders said he would run for reelection as an independent in 2018 despite pressure to run as a Democrat. His party status became ambiguous again in March 2019 when he signed a formal "loyalty pledge" to the Democratic Party stating that he was a member of the party and would serve as a Democrat if elected president. He signed the pledge the day after he signed paperwork to run as an independent for reelection to the Senate in 2024.

After Trump's victory in the 2016 elections, Sanders suggested the Democratic Party undergo a series of reforms and that it "break loose from its corporate establishment ties and, once again, become a grass-roots party of working people, the elderly and the poor." He drew parallels between his campaign and that of the Labour Party in the 2017 UK general election. He wrote in The New York Times that "the British elections should be a lesson for the Democratic Party" and urged the Democrats to stop holding on to an "overly cautious, centrist ideology", arguing that "momentum shifted to Labour after it released a very progressive manifesto that generated much enthusiasm among young people and workers." He had earlier praised Jeremy Corbyn's stance on class issues. Sanders is one of two independents in the Senate, along with Angus King, both of whom caucus with the Democrats.

== Personal life ==
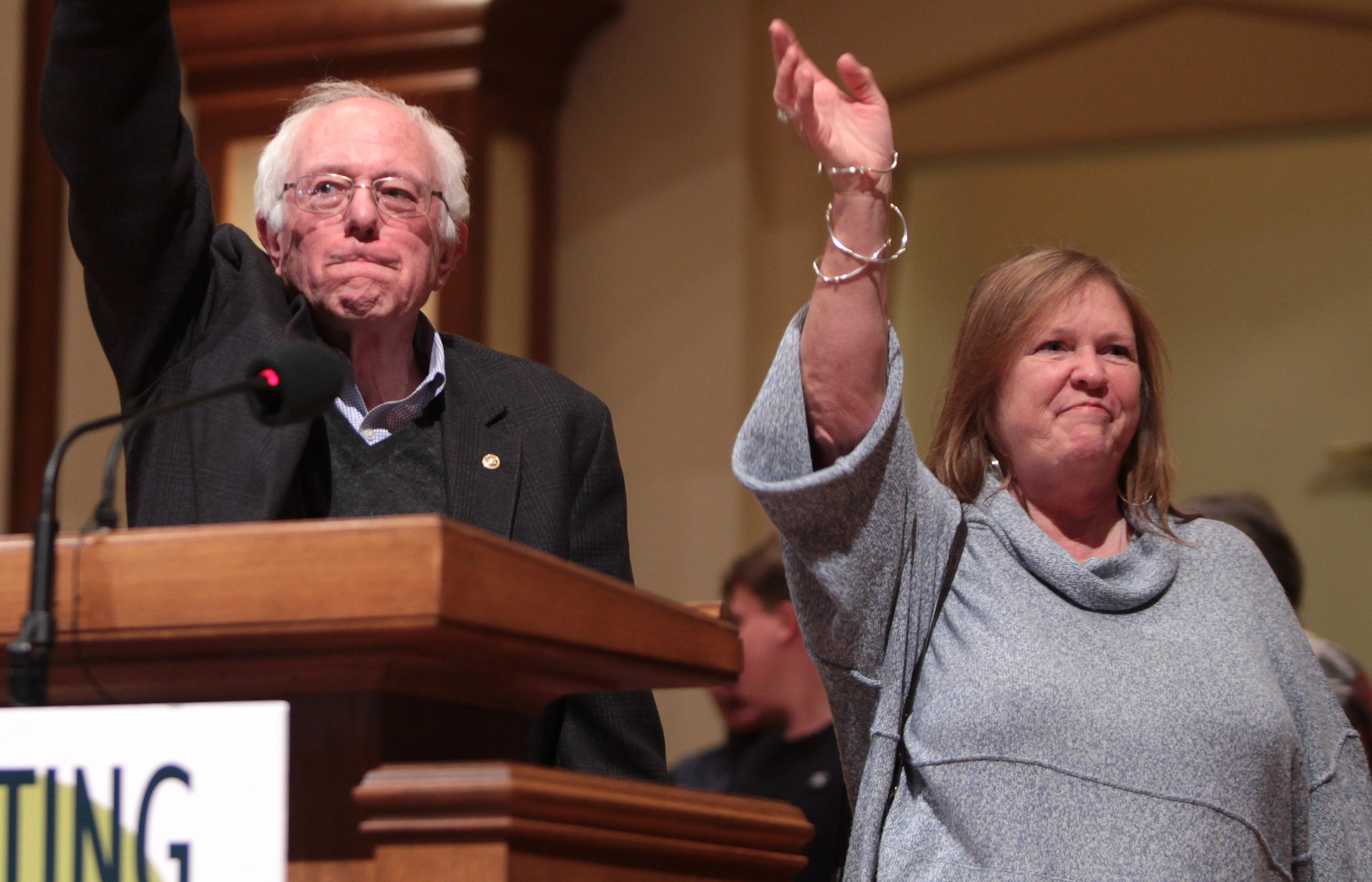
Sanders with his wife Jane in Des Moines, Iowa, January 2016

In 1963, Sanders and Deborah Shiling Messing, whom he met in college, volunteered for several months on the Israeli kibbutz Sha'ar HaAmakim. They married in 1964 and bought a summer home in Vermont; they had no children and divorced in 1966. His son (and only biological child), Levi Sanders, was born in 1969 to then-girlfriend Susan Campbell Mott.

On May 28, 1988, Sanders married Jane O'Meara Driscoll (née Mary Jane O'Meara), who later became president of Burlington College, in Burlington, Vermont. The day after their wedding, the couple visited the Soviet Union as part of an official delegation in his capacity as mayor. They own a row house in Capitol Hill, a house in Burlington's New North End neighborhood, and a lakefront summer home in North Hero. He considers Jane's three children—Dave Driscoll (born 1975), Carina Driscoll (born 1974), and Heather Titus (née Driscoll; 1971)—to be his own.

Sanders's elder brother, Larry, lives in England; he was a Green Party county councillor, representing the East Oxford division on Oxfordshire County Council, until he retired from the council in 2013. Larry ran as a Green Party candidate for Oxford West and Abingdon in the 2015 British general election and came in fifth. Bernie Sanders told CNN, "I owe my brother an enormous amount. It was my brother who actually introduced me to a lot of my ideas."

=== Health ===
On October 1, 2019, Sanders was hospitalized after experiencing chest pains at a campaign event in Las Vegas. His campaign announced the next day that a blockage had been found in one coronary artery and two stents inserted. Scheduled campaign events and appearances were canceled until further notice. Two days later his campaign released a statement that he had been diagnosed with a heart attack. He was released from the hospital the same day. The statement included the following from Sanders's doctors:

After presenting to an outside facility with chest pain, Sen. Sanders was diagnosed with a myocardial infarction. He was immediately transferred to Desert Springs Hospital Medical Center. The senator was stable upon arrival and taken immediately to the cardiac catheterization laboratory, at which time two stents were placed in a blocked coronary artery in a timely fashion. All other arteries were normal. His hospital course was uneventful with good expected progress. He was discharged with instructions to follow up with his personal physician.

A few days after returning home, Sanders addressed media outside his home and said he had experienced fatigue and chest discomfort for a month or two before the incident; he expressed regret for not seeking medical assessment sooner, saying, "I must confess I was dumb."

Sanders made his first national appearance after his heart attack on October 15 at the Democratic debate, at which he said, "I'm healthy, I'm feeling great." When asked how he would reassure voters about his health and ability to take on the duties of the presidency, he said, "We are going to be mounting a vigorous campaign all over this country. That is how I think I can reassure the American people." It was noted that he was "lively and sharp at the debate."

In December 2019, three months after the heart attack, Sanders released letters from three physicians, Attending Physician of Congress Brian P. Monahan and two cardiologists, who declared Sanders healthy and recovered from his heart condition.

=== Honors and awards ===
On December 4, 2015, Sanders won Time's 2015 Person of the Year readers' poll with 10.2% of the vote but did not receive the editorial board's award. On March 20, 2016, he was given an honorary Lushootseed name, dxʷshudičup, (Note: Approximated /duːsˈhuːdiːtʃuːp/ in English; lit. 'the one lighting the fires for change and unity' in Lushootseed) by Deborah Parker in Seattle to honor his focus on Native American issues during his presidential campaign.

On May 30, 2017, Sanders received an honorary degree of Doctor of Humane Letters from Brooklyn College.

=== Religion, heritage, and values ===
As Sanders described his upbringing as an American Jew in a 2016 speech: his father generally attended synagogue only on Yom Kippur; he attended public schools while his mother "chafed" at his yeshiva Sunday schooling at a Hebrew school; and their religious observances were mostly limited to Passover seders with their neighbors. Larry Sanders said of their parents, "They were very pleased to be Jews, but didn't have a strong belief in God." Bernie had a bar mitzvah at the historic Kingsway Jewish Center in Midwood, Brooklyn, where he grew up.

In 1963, in cooperation with the Labor Zionist youth movement Hashomer Hatzair, Sanders and his first wife volunteered at Sha'ar HaAmakim, a kibbutz in northern Israel. His motivation for the trip was as much socialistic as it was Zionistic.

As mayor of Burlington, Sanders allowed a Chabad public menorah to be placed at city hall, an action the ACLU contested. He publicly inaugurated the Hanukkah menorah and performed the Jewish religious ritual of blessing Hanukkah candles. His early and strong support played a significant role in the now widespread public menorah celebrations around the globe. When asked about his Jewish heritage, Sanders has said that he is "proud to be Jewish."

Sanders rarely speaks about religion. He describes himself as "not particularly religious" and "not actively involved" with organized religion. A press package issued by his office states his religion as Jewish. He has said he believes in God, but not necessarily in a traditional way: "I think everyone believes in God in their own ways", he said. "To me, it means that all of us are connected, all of life is connected, and that we are all tied together." In October 2015, on the late-night talk show Jimmy Kimmel Live!, Kimmel asked him, "You say you are culturally Jewish and you don't feel religious; do you believe in God and do you think that's important to the people of the United States?" Sanders replied:

I am who I am, and what I believe in and what my spirituality is about is that we're all in this together. That I think it is not a good thing to believe as human beings we can turn our backs on the suffering of other people ... and this is not Judaism, this is what Pope Francis is talking about, that we can't just worship billionaires and the making of more and more money. Life is more than that.

In 2016, he disclosed that he had "very strong religious and spiritual feelings", adding, "My spirituality is that we are all in this together and that when children go hungry, when veterans sleep out on the street, it impacts me."

Sanders does not regularly attend synagogue, and he does not refrain from working on Rosh Hashanah, as observant Jews do. He has attended yahrzeit observances in memory of the deceased, for the father of a friend, and in 2015 attended a Tashlikh, an atonement ceremony, with the mayor of Lynchburg on the afternoon of Rosh Hashanah. According to Richard Sugarman, his Jewish identity is "certainly more ethnic and cultural than religious." His wife is Roman Catholic, and he has often expressed admiration for Pope Francis, saying that "the leader of the Catholic Church is raising profound issues. It is important that we listen to what he has said." He has said he feels very close to Francis's economic teachings, describing him as "incredibly smart and brave". In April 2016, he accepted an invitation from Marcelo Sánchez Sorondo, an aide close to Francis, to speak at a Vatican conference on economic and environmental issues. While at the Vatican, he met briefly with Francis.

== In popular culture ==
In December 1987, during his tenure as mayor of Burlington, Sanders recorded a folk album, We Shall Overcome, with 30 Vermont musicians. As he was not a skilled singer, he performed his vocals in a talking blues style.

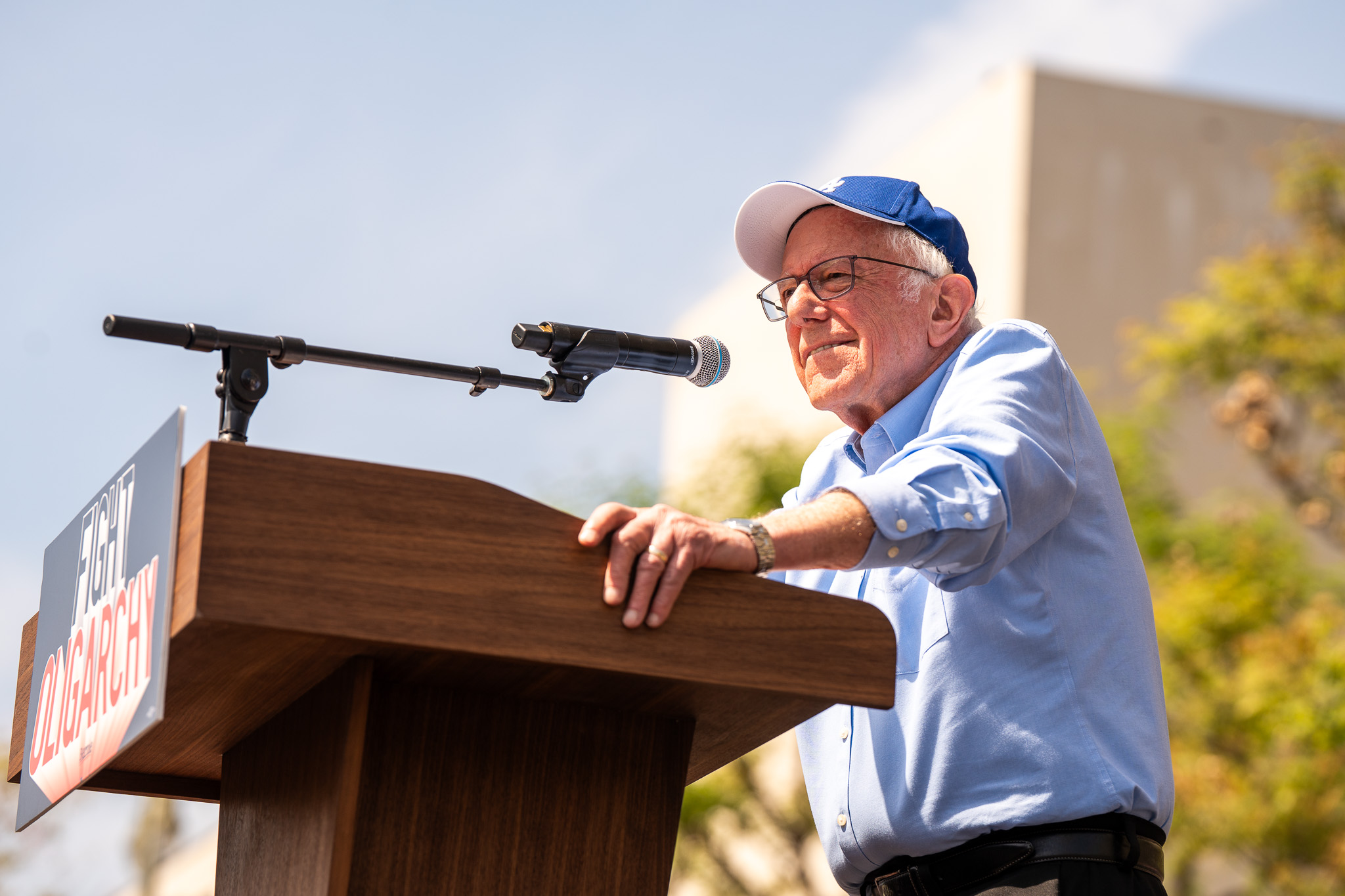
Sanders speaking at a Fighting Oligarchy Tour rally in Los Angeles in April 2025

=== Internet culture ===
Owing to his two high-profile campaigns in the 2016 and 2020 Democratic primaries, Sanders and his campaigns have generated many Internet memes and other online content. The Facebook group Bernie Sanders' Dank Meme Stash, where users can submit memes focused around Sanders, received significant attention in the 2016 primary season due to the at-the-time unique idea of a meme community focused entirely on a politician. During the 2020 primary season, a still from a fundraising video in which Sanders tells the viewers "I am once again asking for your financial support" went viral online, with numerous edits made of the frame. The day before Super Tuesday 2020, a video of the Twitch streamer Neekolul wearing a Bernie 2020 shirt and lip-syncing the song "Oki Doki Boomer" also went viral. In 2021, a frame from the inauguration of Joe Biden showing Sanders seated in a folding chair wearing patterned mittens and a jacket reminiscent of the one in the "I am once again asking" meme went viral, with the image captioned or edited into other images, most commonly popular movie scenes.

In 2026, Politico named Sanders one of the "biggest social media stars in Congress", alongside Representative Alexandria Ocasio-Cortez, Senator John Kennedy, Senator Rand Paul, and Representative Brandon Gill.

=== In film and television ===
Sanders appeared in a cameo role in the 1988 comedy-drama film Sweet Hearts Dance, playing a man who distributes candy to young trick-or-treaters. In 1999, he acted in the film My X-Girlfriend's Wedding Reception, playing Rabbi Manny Shevitz. In this role, he mourned the Brooklyn Dodgers' move to Los Angeles, reflecting Sanders's own upbringing in Brooklyn. On February 6, 2016, he was a guest star alongside Larry David (who is a sixth cousin once removed of Sanders) on Saturday Night Live, playing a Polish immigrant on a steamship that was sinking near the Statue of Liberty.

In the DC Extended Universe film Birds of Prey (and the Fantabulous Emancipation of One Harley Quinn), one of the reasons Roman Sionis wants Harley Quinn dead is that she "voted for Bernie".

== Publications ==
=== Books ===
- With Huck Gutman, Outsider in the White House. London: Verso Books. 2015 [1997]. ISBN 978-1-78478-418-8. OCLC 918986570.
- In Robert McChesney; Russell Newman; Ben Scott, eds. (2005). "Why Americans Should Take Back the Media". The Future of Media: Resistance and Reform in the 21st Century. Seven Stories Press. ISBN 978-1-58322-679-7. OCLC 57574152.
- The Speech: A Historic Filibuster on Corporate Greed and the Decline of Our Middle Class. New York: Bold Type Books. 2015 [2011]. ISBN 978-1-56858-554-3. LCCN 2011920256. OCLC 927456901. OL 25090387M.
- Our Revolution: A Future to Believe In. Thomas Dunne Books. 2016. ISBN 978-1-250-13292-5. OCLC 1026148801.
- Bernie Sanders Guide to Political Revolution. Henry Holt and Company. 2017. ISBN 978-1-250-13890-3. OCLC 999379791.
- Where We Go from Here: Two Years in the Resistance. Gale. 2018. ISBN 978-1-432-86916-8. OCLC 1126540640.
- It's OK to Be Angry About Capitalism. Crown Books. 2023. ISBN 978-0593238714.
- Fight Oligarchy, Crown Books, Oct. 2025. ISBN 979-8-217-08916-1

=== Articles ===
- "Ending America's Endless War." Foreign Affairs, June 24, 2019
- "Washington's Dangerous New Consensus on China." Foreign Affairs, June 17, 2021
- "A Revolution in American Foreign Policy." Foreign Affairs, March 18, 2024
- "Democrats must choose: The elites or the working class." The Boston Globe, November 10, 2024
- "Bernie Sanders: Kennedy Must Resign." The New York Times, August 30, 2025

== See also ==
- Electoral history of Bernie Sanders
- History of the socialist movement in the United States
- Spintharus berniesandersi – Species of arachnid named after Sanders
- Third-party members of the United States House of Representatives

=== Lists ===
- List of elected socialist mayors in the United States
- List of Jewish members of the United States Congress
- List of people who received an electoral vote in the United States Electoral College
- List of United States Democratic Party presidential candidates
- List of United States Democratic Party presidential tickets

== Notes ==
Political offices
Preceded by Gordon Paquette	Mayor of Burlington; 1981–1989	Succeeded by Peter Clavelle
U.S. House of Representatives
Preceded by Peter Plympton Smith	Member of the U.S. House of Representatives from Vermont's at-large congressional district 1991–2007	Succeeded by Peter Welch
Party political offices
New office	Chair of the Congressional Progressive Caucus; 1991–1999	Succeeded by Dennis Kucinich
Preceded by Ed Flanagan	Democratic nominee for U.S. Senator from Vermont (Class 1); Affiliated; 2006, 2012, 2018, 2024	Most recent
Preceded by Amy Klobuchar as Chair of the Senate Democratic Steering and Outreach Committee	Chair of the Senate Democratic Outreach Committee; 2017–present	Incumbent
U.S. Senate
Preceded by Jim Jeffords	U.S. Senator (Class 1) from Vermont; 2007–present Served alongside: Patrick Leahy, Peter Welch	Incumbent
Preceded by Patty Murray	Chair of the Senate Veterans' Affairs Committee; 2013–2015	Succeeded by Johnny Isakson
Preceded by Jeff Sessions	Ranking Member of the Senate Budget Committee; 2015–2021	Succeeded by Lindsey Graham
Preceded by Mike Enzi	Chair of the Senate Budget Committee; 2021–2023	Succeeded by Sheldon Whitehouse
Preceded by Patty Murray	Chair of the Senate Health Committee; 2023–2025	Succeeded by Bill Cassidy
Preceded by Bill Cassidy	Ranking Member of the Senate Health Committee; 2025–present	Incumbent
U.S. order of precedence (ceremonial)
Preceded by Sheldon Whitehouse	Order of precedence of the United States as United States Senator	Succeeded by Amy Klobuchar
Preceded by John Thune	United States senators by seniority 14th	Succeeded by Amy Klobuchar
