= Where We Go from Here =

2018 book by Bernie Sanders

Where We Go from Here: Two Years in the Resistance
- Author: Bernie Sanders
- Language: English
- Published: November 27, 2018
- Publisher: Thomas Dunne Books
- Publication place: United States
- Pages: 288
- ISBN: 9781250163264
- Preceded by: Bernie Sanders Guide to Political Revolution

Where We Go from Here: Two Years in the Resistance is a book by U.S. Senator from Vermont Bernie Sanders, published by Thomas Dunne Books on November 27, 2018.

The book chronicles the senator's actions from June 2016 to August 2018. It also elaborates on Sanders' political ideology.

== Contents ==
Within the book, Bernie Sanders chronicles what he and other progressives have done since 2016 while also laying out his policy agenda. He goes into detail about how he worked with the Clinton campaign to craft the "most progressive political platform in U.S. history."

After not winning the 2016 Democratic nomination, Bernie Sanders explains why he chose to campaign for Hillary Clinton, citing Donald Trump's racism and corruption as reasons.

Following the election portion of the book, Bernie Sanders explains in great detail what he has done over the course of the following two years. The book details Sanders' role in preventing the Republicans from killing the Affordable Care Act, his leadership role in the Democratic Party, his efforts to raise the minimum wage to $15 an hour, and his campaigning for progressive candidates in the 2018 midterm elections.

Throughout the entire book, Bernie Sanders repeats his belief that only grassroots movements of people can bring political change. He explains that many of the people who attend his rallies are young people and that a large number of 2018 candidates were first or second time candidates.

== Reception ==
John R. Coyne Jr. of The Washington Times praised some of Sanders' stated goals, but wrote that the book is more focused on nostalgia than accomplishments. Annalisa Quinn of NPR noted that in the book, Sanders not only was critical of Republicans, he also criticized Democrats as too ineffective. Tom Ferguson of the Like the Dew blog wrote "One could question whether the book has a lot of filler in the form of speeches Bernie made on this and other tours but, since they're good, important speeches, they justify themselves" and that Sanders's questioning of American foreign policy "highlights Bernie as one of the very few elected officials with the courage to go down those roads."
