= Bernie Sanders Guide to Political Revolution =

Book by Bernie Sanders

- Author: Bernie Sanders
- Language: English
- Publisher: Henry Holt and Company
- Publication date: August 29, 2017
- Publication place: United States
- Pages: 240
- ISBN: 978-1-250-13890-3

Bernie Sanders Guide to Political Revolution is a 2017 bestselling political book authored by U.S. Senator Bernie Sanders, published by Henry Holt and Co. It is primarily aimed at teenage readers.

== Content ==
The book is a young adult adaptation of 2016's Our Revolution, in which Sanders chronicled his upbringing, first brushes with Democratic Socialism, and emergence into American politics—capped off, with an outline of his policies. It has an emphasis on calling on young people "to fight for a progressive economic, environmental, racial, and social justice agenda that creates jobs, raises wages, protects the environment, and provides healthcare for all."

In the foreword, Sanders points out that, in his campaign for president, he received more votes from young people than Donald Trump's and Hillary Clinton's combined, and that "in virtually every state primary and caucus, we won the overwhelming majority of young people—black, white, Latino, Asian American, and Native American".

The book features numerous infographics and illustrations in the hopes of breaking down complex issues like income inequality, climate change, healthcare, law enforcement reform, prison system reform and student loan debt.
